= Environmental tolerance in tardigrades =

Physiology of survival in a group of animals

When dried, terrestrial tardigrades draw in their legs and go into a cryptobiotic 'tun' state. They can quickly revive when re-wetted. mg = midgut; go = gonad; pb = pharyngeal bulb; mo = mouth; st = stylet

From the early 19th century, tardigrades' environmental tolerance has been a noted feature of the group. The animals are able to survive extremes of temperature, desiccation, impact, radiation, and exposure to the vacuum of space.

== Environmental tolerance ==
In 1834, C.A.S. Schulze, giving the first formal description of a tardigrade, Macrobiotus hufelandi, explicitly noted the animal's exceptional ability to tolerate environmental stress, subtitling his work "a new animal from the crustacean class, capable of reviving after prolonged asphyxia and dryness".

Tardigrades are not considered extremophilic because they are not adapted to exploit extreme conditions, only to endure them. This means that their chances of dying increase the longer they are exposed to the extreme environments, whereas true extremophiles thrive there.

== Cryptobiosis and the dehydrated 'tun' state ==
Video of anhydrobiosis, a form of cryptobiosis, in the tardigrade Richtersius coronifer

Tardigrades are capable of suspending their metabolism, going into a state of cryptobiosis. Terrestrial and freshwater tardigrades are able to tolerate long periods when water is not available, such as when the moss or pond they are living in dries out, by drawing their legs in and forming a desiccated cyst, the cryptobiotic 'tun' state, where no metabolic activity takes place. In this state, they can go without food or water for several years. Further, in that state they become highly resistant to environmental stresses, including temperatures from as low as −272 °C (−458 °F) to as much as +149 °C (300 °F) (at least for short periods of time), lack of oxygen, vacuum, ionising radiation, and high pressure.

Marine tardigrades such as Halobiotus crispae alternate each year (cyclomorphosis) between an active summer morph and a hibernating winter morph (a pseudosimplex) that can resist freezing and low salinity, but which remains active throughout. Reproduction however takes place only in the summer morph.

== Specific environmental stresses ==
=== Extremes of temperature ===
Tardigrades can survive in extremes of temperature that would kill almost any other animal, including:

- A few minutes at 151 °C (304 °F)
- 30 years at −20 °C (−4 °F)
- At −200 °C (−328 °F; 73 K)
- At −272 °C (−458 °F; 1 K)

Tardigrades are however sensitive to high temperatures: 48 hours at 37.1 °C (98.8 °F) kills half of unacclimatized active tardigrades. Acclimation boosts the lethal temperature to 37.6 °C (99.7 °F). Those in the tun state fare better, half surviving 82.7 °C (180.9 °F) for one hour. Longer exposure decreases the lethal temperature. For 24 hours of exposure, 63.1 °C (145.6 °F) kills half of the tun state tardigrades.

=== Impact ===
Tardigrades can survive impacts up to about 900 metres per second (3,000 ft/s), and momentary shock pressures up to about 1.14 gigapascals (165,000 psi).

=== Radiation ===
Tardigrades can withstand 1,000 times more radiation than other animals, median lethal doses of 5,000 Gy (of gamma rays) and 6,200 Gy (of heavy ions) in hydrated animals (5 to 10 Gy could be fatal to a human). Earlier experiments attributed this to their lowered water content, providing fewer reactants for ionizing radiation. However, tardigrades, when hydrated, remain much more resistant to shortwave UV radiation than other animals; one reason is their ability to repair damage to their DNA.

=== Exposure to space ===
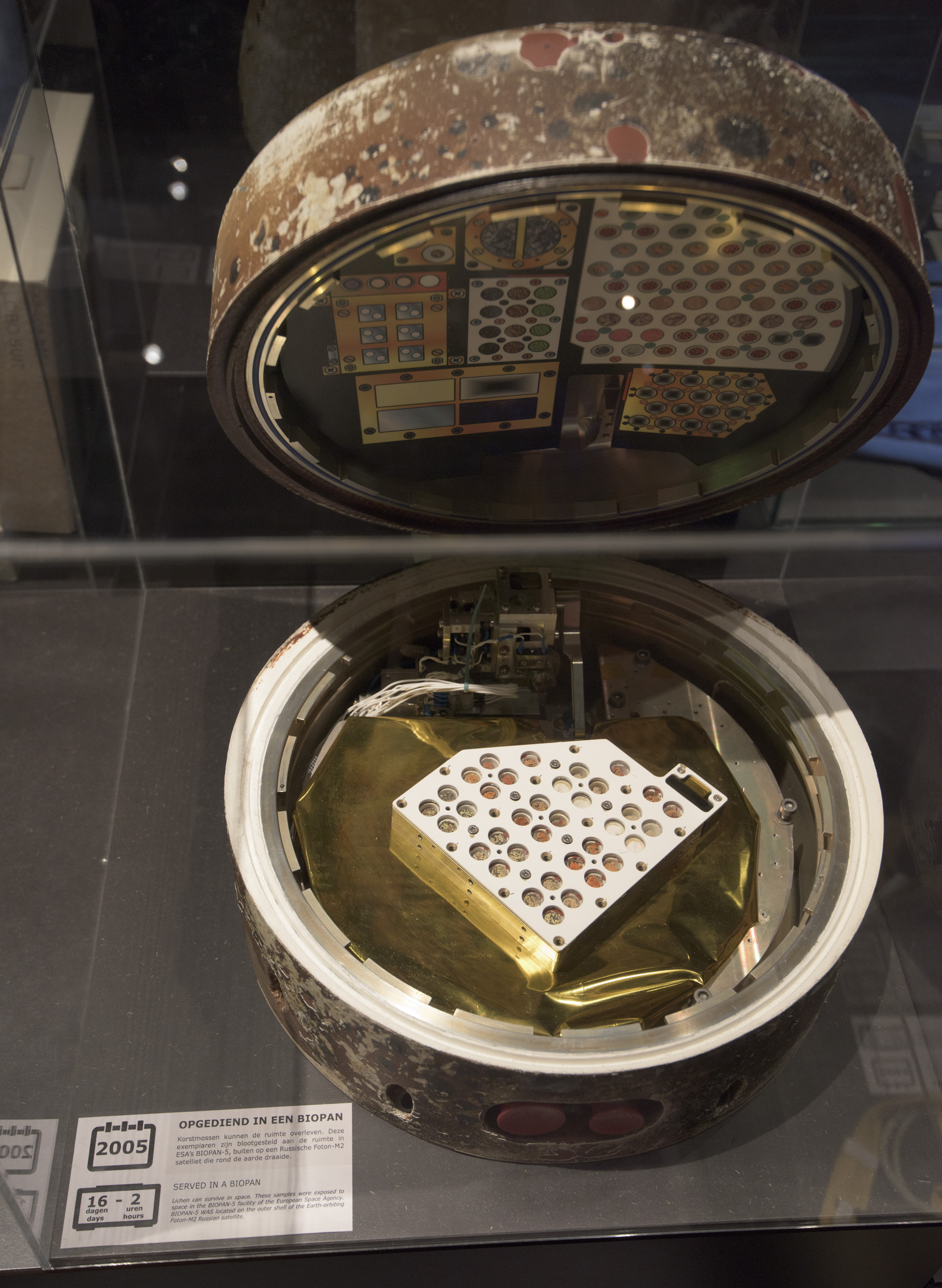
The 2007 FOTON-M3 mission carrying the BIOPAN astrobiology payload (illustrated) exposed tardigrades to vacuum, solar ultraviolet, or both, showing their ability to survive in the space environment.

Tardigrades have survived exposure to space. In 2007, dehydrated tardigrades were taken on the FOTON-M3 mission and exposed to vacuum, or to both vacuum and solar ultraviolet, for 10 days. Back on Earth, more than 68% of the subjects protected from ultraviolet were reanimated by rehydration, and many produced viable embryos.

In contrast, hydrated samples exposed to vacuum and solar ultraviolet survived poorly, with only three subjects of Milnesium tardigradum surviving. The space vacuum did not much affect egg-laying in either R. coronifer or M. tardigradum, whereas UV radiation reduced egg-laying in M. tardigradum. In 2011, tardigrades went on the International Space Station STS-134, showing that they could survive microgravity and cosmic radiation, and should be suitable model organisms.

In 2019, a capsule containing tardigrades in a cryptobiotic state was on board the Israeli lunar lander Beresheet which crashed on the Moon.

== Damage protection proteins ==
Tardigrades' ability to remain desiccated for long periods of time was thought to depend on high levels of the sugar trehalose, common in organisms that survive desiccation. However, tardigrades do not synthesize enough trehalose for this function. Instead, tardigrades produce intrinsically disordered proteins in response to desiccation. Three of these are specific to tardigrades and have been called tardigrade specific proteins. These may protect membranes from damage by associating with the polar heads of lipid molecules. The proteins may also form a glass-like matrix that protects cytoplasm from damage during desiccation. Anhydrobiosis in response to desiccation has a complex molecular basis; in Hypsibius exemplaris, 1,422 genes are upregulated during the process. Of those, 406 are specific to tardigrades, 55 being intrinsically disordered and the others globular with unknown functions.

Tardigrades possess a cold shock protein; Maria Kamilari and colleagues propose (2019) that this may serve "as a RNA-chaperone involved in regulation of translation [of RNA code to proteins] following freezing."

Tardigrade DNA is protected from radiation by the Dsup ("damage suppressor") protein. The Dsup proteins of Ramazzottius varieornatus and H. exemplaris promote survival by binding to nucleosomes and protecting chromosomal DNA from hydroxyl radicals. The Dsup protein of R. varieornatus confers resistance to ultraviolet-C by upregulating DNA repair genes.

== Sources ==
- Brusca, Richard C.; Moore, Wendy; Shuster, Stephen M. (2016). Invertebrates (3rd ed.). Sinauer Associates. pp. 711–717. ISBN 978-1-60535-375-3.
