= 1994 in spaceflight =

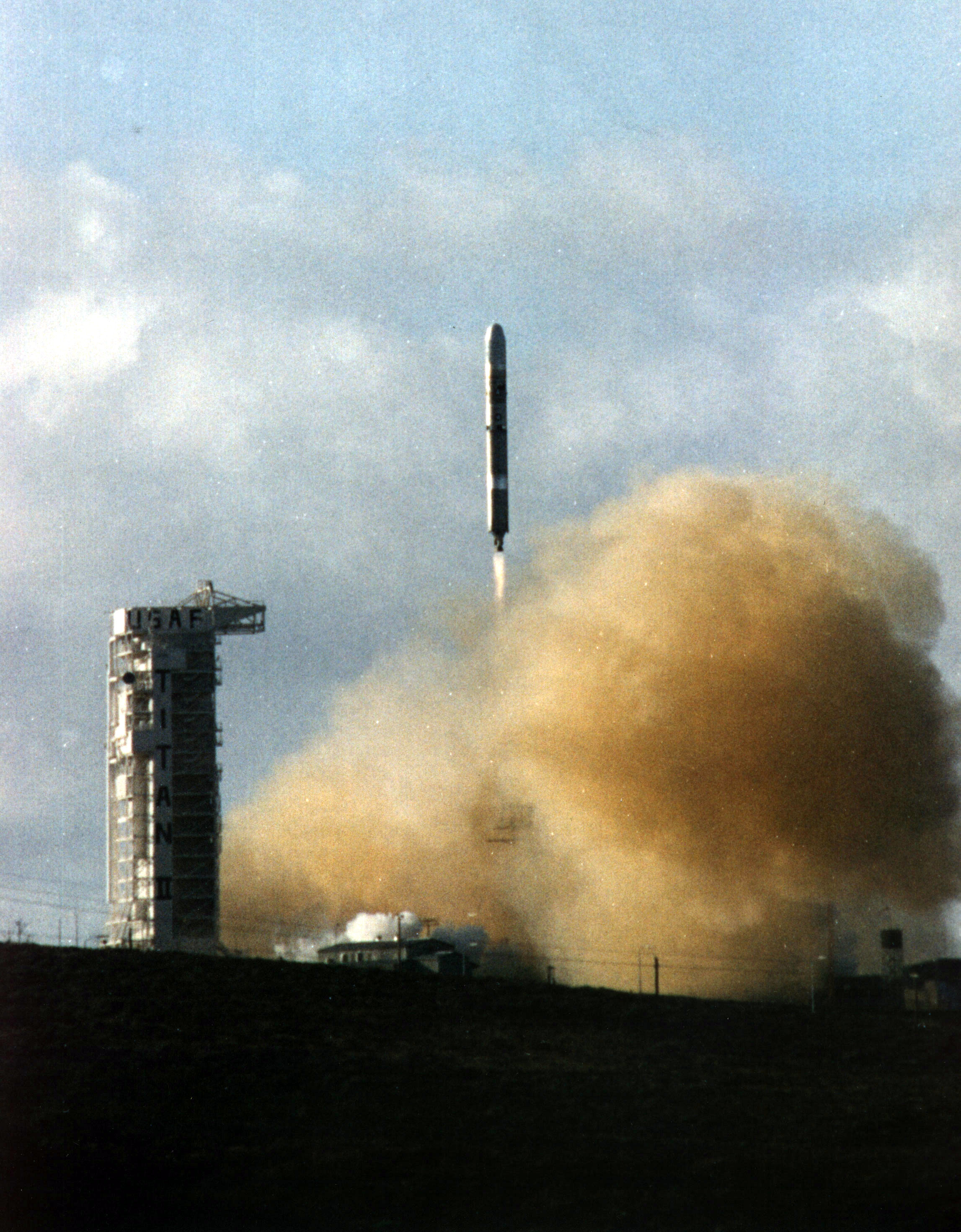
- The launch of the Clementine lunar orbiter on a Titan 23G

Orbital launches
- First: 8 January
- Last: 30 December
- Total: 93
- Successes: 88
- Failures: 4
- Partial failures: 1
- Catalogued: 89

Rockets
- Maiden flights: H-II; Pegasus-XL; Taurus
- Retirements: ASLV; Scout G-1; Pegasus Standard

Crewed flights
- Orbital: 10
- Total travellers: 44

1994 in spaceflight

This article outlines notable events occurring in 1994 in spaceflight, including major launches and EVAs.

== Clementine lunar orbiter ==
On January 25, 1994, Clementine was launched from Space Launch Complex 4 West at Vandenberg Air Force Base, California, using a Titan II launch vehicle. The mission had two phases. After two Earth flybys, lunar insertion was achieved approximately one month after launch. Lunar mapping took place over approximately two months, in two parts. The first part consisted of a five-hour elliptical polar orbit with a periapsis of about 400 km at 13 degrees south latitude and an apoapsis of 8,300 km. Each orbit consisted of an 80-minute lunar mapping phase near periapsis and 139 minutes of downlink at apoapsis.

== Orbital launches ==
- ← Jan
- Feb
- Mar
- Apr
- May
- Jun
- Jul
- Aug
- Sep
- Oct
- Nov
- Dec →

Date and time (UTC)	Rocket	Flight number	Launch site		LSP	
Date and time (UTC)	Payload (⚀ = CubeSat)	Operator	Orbit	Function	Decay (UTC)	Outcome
Date and time (UTC)	Remarks					
=== January ===
8 January; 10:05:34	(Russia) Soyuz-U2		(Kazakhstan) Baikonur Site 1/5		(Russia) Roskosmos	
8 January; 10:05:34	(Russia) Soyuz TM-18	Roskosmos	Low Earth (Mir)	Mir EO-15	9 July; 10:32:35	Successful
8 January; 10:05:34	Crewed orbital flight with three cosmonauts					
20 January; 09:49:00	(Russia) Proton-K/DM-2M		(Kazakhstan) Baikonur Site 81/23		(Russia)	
20 January; 09:49:00	(Russia) Gals-1	Intersputnik	Geosynchronous	Communications	In orbit	Operational
24 January; 21:37:00	(France) Ariane 4 (44LP)		(France) Kourou ELA-2		(France) Arianespace	
24 January; 21:37:00	(France) Eutelsat 2F5	Eutelsat	Intended: Geosynchronous	Communications	~90 seconds	Launch failure
24 January; 21:37:00	(Turkey) Türksat-1A	Türksat	Intended: Geosynchronous	Communications	~90 seconds	Launch failure
24 January; 21:37:00	Third stage malfunction					
25 January; 00:25:00	(Ukraine) Tsyklon-3		(Russia) Plesetsk Site 32		(Russia) Roskosmos	
25 January; 00:25:00	(Russia) Meteor-3-06	Roskomsos	Low Earth	Weather	In orbit	Operational
25 January; 00:25:00	(Germany) Tubsat-B	TUB	Low Earth	Technology development	In orbit	Spacecraft failure
25 January; 00:25:00	Tubsat failed after 39 days of operation					
25 January; 16:34:00	(United States) Titan 23G		(United States) Vandenberg SLC-4W		(United States) BMDO/NASA	
25 January; 16:34:00	(United States) Clementine	NASA/BMDO	Selenocentric and High Earth	Lunar orbiter	In orbit	Partial spacecraft failure
25 January; 16:34:00	(United States) ISA	NASA/BMDO	High Earth		8 June	Successful
25 January; 16:34:00	Computer failure after ejection from lunar orbit prevented flyby of 1620 Geographos					
28 January; 02:12:00	(Russia) Soyuz-U		(Kazakhstan) Baikonur Site 1/5		(Russia) Roskosmos	
28 January; 02:12:00	(Russia) Progress M-21	Roskosmos	Low Earth (Mir)	Logistics	23 March; 05:13:00	Successful
=== February ===
3 February; 12:10	(United States) Space Shuttle Discovery		(United States) Kennedy LC-39A		(United States) United Space Alliance	
3 February; 12:10	(United States) STS-60	NASA	Low Earth (Mir)	Shuttle-Mir flight	11 February; 19:24	Successful
3 February; 12:10	(United States) SpaceHab LSM	NASA/SpaceHab	Low Earth (Discovery)	Scientific research	11 February; 19:24	Successful
3 February; 12:10	(United States) Wake Shield Facility	NASA	Low Earth (Discovery)	Deployable scientific platform	11 February; 19:24	Successful
3 February; 12:10	(United States) GBA-6	NASA	Low Earth (Discovery)		11 February; 19:24	Successful
3 February; 12:10	(United States) ODERACS A	NASA	Low Earth	Laser calibration	2 October	Successful
3 February; 12:10	(United States) ODERACS B	NASA	Low Earth	Laser calibration	4 October	Successful
3 February; 12:10	(United States) ODERACS C	NASA	Low Earth	Laser calibration	31 December	Successful
3 February; 12:10	(United States) ODERACS D	NASA	Low Earth	Laser calibration	31 December	Successful
3 February; 12:10	(United States) ODERACS E	NASA	Low Earth	Laser calibration	3 March 1995	Successful
3 February; 12:10	(United States) ODERACS F	NASA	Low Earth	Laser calibration	24 February 1995	Successful
3 February; 12:10	(United Kingdom) BremSat 1	DARA/Bre	Low Earth	Scientific research	12 February 1995	Successful
3 February; 12:10	Crewed orbital flight with six astronauts; first mission of the Shuttle-Mir Programme; ODERACS deployed from Discovery on 9 February					
3 February; 22:00	(Japan) H-II		(Japan) Tanegashima LA-Y		(Japan) NASDA	
3 February; 22:00	(Japan) OREX (Ryusei)	NASDA	Low Earth	Reentry experiment	3 February	Successful
3 February; 22:00	(Japan) VEP (Myojo)	NASDA	Geosynchronous transfer	Monitor rocket performance	In orbit	Successful
3 February; 22:00	Maiden flight of H-II rocket and first launch from LA-Y					
5 February; 08:46	(Russia) Proton-K/DM-2		(Kazakhstan) Baikonur Site 81/23		(Russia) Roskosmos	
5 February; 08:46	(Russia) Raduga 1-3	MOM	Geosynchronous	Communications	In orbit	Operational
7 February; 21:47	(United States) Titan IVA (401)/Centaur		(United States) Cape Canaveral LC-40		(United States)	
7 February; 21:47	(United States) USA-99 (Milstar 1)	US Air Force	Geosynchronous	Communications	In orbit	Operational
7 February; 21:47	Maiden flight of Titan IV (401A)					
8 February; 08:34	(China) Long March 3A		(China) Xichang LA-2		(China) CASC	
8 February; 08:34	(China) Shijian 4	CASC	Geosynchronous transfer	Particle research	In orbit	Operational
8 February; 08:34	(China) KF-1	CASC	Geosynchronous transfer	DFH-3 spacecraft boilerplate	In orbit	Successful
8 February; 08:34	Maiden flight of Long March 3A					
12 February; 08:54	(Ukraine) Tsyklon-3		(Russia) Plesetsk Site 32		(Russia) Roskosmos	
12 February; 08:54	(Russia) Kosmos 2268 (Strela-3)	MO RF	Low Earth	Communications	In orbit	Operational
12 February; 08:54	(Russia) Kosmos 2269 (Strela-3)	MO RF	Low Earth	Communications	In orbit	Operational
12 February; 08:54	(Russia) Kosmos 2270 (Strela-3)	MO RF	Low Earth	Communications	In orbit	Operational
12 February; 08:54	(Russia) Kosmos 2271 (Strela-3)	MO RF	Low Earth	Communications	In orbit	Operational
12 February; 08:54	(Russia) Kosmos 2272 (Strela-3)	MO RF	Low Earth	Communications	In orbit	Operational
12 February; 08:54	(Russia) Kosmos 2273 (Strela-3)	MO RF	Low Earth	Communications	In orbit	Operational
18 February; 07:56	(Russia) Proton-K/DM-2		(Kazakhstan) Baikonur Site 81/23		(Russia) Roskosmos	
18 February; 07:56	(Russia) Raduga 31	MOM	Geosynchronous	Communications	In orbit	Operational
19 February; 23:45	(United States) Delta II (7925–8)		(United States) Cape Canaveral LC-17B		(United States) Boeing IDS	
19 February; 23:45	(United States) Galaxy 1R		Geosynchronous	Communications	In orbit	Operational
=== March ===
2 March; 03:25	(Ukraine) Tsyklon-3		(Russia) Plesetsk Site 32		(Russia) Roskosmos	
2 March; 03:25	(Russia) / (Ukraine) Intercosmos 26 (Koronas-I)	Intercosmos/Roskosmos	Low Earth	Solar astronomy	4 March 2001	Successful
4 March; 13:15	(United States) Space Shuttle Columbia		(United States) Kennedy LC-39B		(United States) United Space Alliance	
4 March; 13:15	(United States) STS-62	NASA	Low Earth	Microgravity research	18 March; 13:10	Successful
4 March; 13:15	(United States) OAST-2	OAST	Low Earth (Columbia)	Technology development	18 March; 13:10	Successful
4 March; 13:15	(United States) USMP-2	NASA	Low Earth (Columbia)	Microgravity research	18 March; 13:10	Successful
4 March; 13:15	(United States) EDO Pallet	NASA	Low Earth (Columbia)	Cryogenic mission extension pallet	18 March; 13:10	Successful
4 March; 13:15	Crewed orbital flight with five astronauts					
10 March; 03:40	(United States) Delta II (7925)		(United States) Cape Canaveral LC-17A		(United States) US Air Force	
10 March; 03:40	(United States) USA-100 (GPS IIA-15)	US Air Force	Medium Earth	Navigation	In orbit	Operational
10 March; 03:40	(United States) SEDS-2	US Air Force	Low Earth	Tether experiment	8 May	Successful
13 March; 22:32	(United States) Taurus		(United States) Vandenberg LC-576E		(United States) Orbital Sciences	
13 March; 22:32	(United States) USA-101 (STEP-0)	SDI	Low Earth	Technology development	In orbit	Successful
13 March; 22:32	(United States) USA-102 (DARPASAT)	DARPA	Low Earth	Technology development	In orbit	Successful
13 March; 22:32	Maiden flight of Taurus rocket					
17 March; 16:30	(Russia) Soyuz-U		(Russia) Plesetsk Site 43/4		(Russia) VKS	
17 March; 16:30	(Russia) Kosmos 2274 (Yantar)	VKS	Low Earth	Reconnaissance	21 May	Successful
22 March; 04:54	(Russia) Soyuz-U		(Kazakhstan) Baikonur Site 1/5		(Russia) Roskosmos	
22 March; 04:54	(Russia) Progress M-22	Roskosmos	Low Earth (Mir)	Logistics	23 May	Successful
=== April ===
9 April; 11:05	(United States) Space Shuttle Endeavour		(United States) Kennedy LC-39A		(United States) United Space Alliance	
9 April; 11:05	(United States) STS-59	NASA	Low Earth	Radar mapping	20 April; 16:54	Successful
9 April; 11:05	(United States) Spacelab Pallet	NASA	Low Earth (Endeavour)	Spacelab SRL-1	20 April; 16:54	Successful
9 April; 11:05	Crewed orbital flight with six astronauts					
11 April; 07:49	(Russia) Proton-K/DM-2		(Kazakhstan) Baikonur Site 81/23		(Russia) VKS	
11 April; 07:49	(Russia) Kosmos 2275 (GLONASS)	MOM	Medium Earth	Navigation	In orbit	Operational
11 April; 07:49	(Russia) Kosmos 2276 (GLONASS)	MOM	Medium Earth	Navigation	In orbit	Operational
11 April; 07:49	(Russia) Kosmos 2277 (GLONASS)	MOM	Medium Earth	Navigation	In orbit	Operational
13 April; 06:04	(United States) Atlas I		(United States) Cape Canaveral LC-36B		(United States) Lockheed Martin	
13 April; 06:04	(United States) GOES 8	NOAA	Current: Graveyard; Operational: Geosynchronous	Weather	In orbit	Successful
13 April; 06:04	Retired and moved to graveyard orbit on 5 May 2004					
23 April; 08:01	(Ukraine) Zenit-2		(Kazakhstan) Baikonur Site 45/1		(Russia) VKS	
23 April; 08:01	(Russia) Kosmos 2278 (Tselina)	MO RF	Low Earth	SIGINT	In orbit	Operational
26 April; 02:14	(Russia) Kosmos-3M		(Russia) Plesetsk Site 133/3		(Russia) VKS	
26 April; 02:14	(Russia) Kosmos 2279 (Parus)	MO RF	Low Earth	Navigation	In orbit	Operational
28 April; 17:14	(Russia) Soyuz-U2		(Kazakhstan) Baikonur Site 31/6		(Russia) VKS	
28 April; 17:14	(Russia) Kosmos 2280 (Yantar)	MOM	Low Earth	Reconnaissance	10 March 1995	Successful
=== May ===
3 May; 15:55	(United States) Titan IVA (401)/Centaur		(United States) Cape Canaveral LC-41		(United States)	
3 May; 15:55	(United States) USA-103 (Trumpet)	NRO	Molniya	SIGINT	In orbit	Operational
4 May; 00:00	(India) ASLV		(India) Sriharikota		(India) ISRO	
4 May; 00:00	(India) SROSS-C2	IRSO	Low Earth	Ionospheric	12 July 2001	Successful
4 May; 00:00	Final flight of ASLV					
9 May; 02:47	(United States) Scout-G1		(United States) Vandenberg SLC-5		(United States)	
9 May; 02:47	(United States) MSTI-2	US Air Force/BMDO	Low Earth	Technology development	28 November 1998	Successful
9 May; 02:47	Final flight of Scout rocket family					
19 May; 17:03	(United States) Pegasus/HAPS		(United States) Stargazer, Edwards		(United States) Orbital Sciences	
19 May; 17:03	(United States) STEP-2 (SIDEX)	US Air Force/STP	Low Earth	Technology demonstration	In orbit	Partial launch failure
19 May; 17:03	Placed in incorrect orbit due to carrier rocket underperformance					
20 May; 02:01	(Russia) Proton-K/DM-2		(Kazakhstan) Baikonur Site 81/23		(Russia) VKS	
20 May; 02:01	(Russia) Gorizont 30	MOM	Geosynchronous	Communications	In orbit	Operational
22 May; 04:30	(Russia) Soyuz-U		(Kazakhstan) Baikonur Site 1/5		(Russia) Roskosmos	
22 May; 04:30	(Russia) Progress M-23	Roskosmos	Low Earth (Mir)	Logistics	2 July; 14:57	Successful
22 May; 04:30	(Russia) VBK-Raduga	Roskosmos	Low Earth (Mir)	Sample return	2 July; 15:09	Successful
25 May; 10:15	(Ukraine) Tsyklon-3		(Russia) Plesetsk Site 32/2		(Russia) VKS	
25 May; 10:15	(Russia) Tselina	MO RF	Intended: Low Earth	SIGINT	25 May	Launch failure
25 May; 10:15	Software error prevented stage 2/3 separation					
=== June ===
7 June; 07:20	(Russia) Soyuz-U		(Russia) Plesetsk Site 16/2		(Russia) VKS	
7 June; 07:20	(Russia) Kosmos 2281 (Zenit-8/Oblik)	MOM	Low Earth	Reconnaissance	29 July	Successful
14 June; 16:05	(Russia) Soyuz-U		(Russia) Plesetsk Site 43/3		(Russia) VKS	
14 June; 16:05	(Russia) Foton 9	Roskosmos	Low Earth	Microgravity research	2 July	Successful
17 June; 07:07	(France) Ariane 4 (44LP)		(France) Kourou ELA-2		(France) Arianespace	
17 June; 07:07	(United Nations) Intelsat 702	Intelsat	Geosynchronous	Communications	In orbit	Successful
17 June; 07:07	(United Kingdom) STRV-1A	DRA	Geosynchronous transfer	Technology development	In orbit	Successful
17 June; 07:07	(United Kingdom) STRV-1B	DRA	Geosynchronous transfer	Technology development	In orbit	Successful
24 June; 13:50	(United States) Atlas I		(United States) Cape Canaveral LC-36B		(United States)	
24 June; 13:50	(United States) USA-104 (UHF F/O 3)	US Navy	Geosynchronous	Communications	In orbit	Operational
27 June; 21:15	(United States) Pegasus-XL		(United States) Stargazer, Vandenberg		(United States) Orbital Sciences	
27 June; 21:15	(United States) STEP-1	US Air Force/STP	Intended: Low Earth	Technology development	27 June	Launch failure
27 June; 21:15	Maiden flight of Pegasus-XL					
=== July ===
1 July; 12:24	(Russia) Soyuz-U2		(Kazakhstan) Baikonur Site 1/5		(Russia) Roskosmos	
1 July; 12:24	(Russia) Soyuz TM-19	Roskosmos	Low Earth (Mir)	Mir EO-16	4 November	Successful
1 July; 12:24	Crewed orbital flight with two cosmonauts					
3 July; 08:00	(China) Long March 2D		(China) Jiuquan LA-2B		(China) CASC	
3 July; 08:00	(China) FSW-2	CASC	Low Earth	Reconnaissance	18 July	Successful
6 July; 23:58	(Russia) Proton-K/DM-2		(Kazakhstan) Baikonur Site 81/23		(Russia) VKS	
6 July; 23:58	(Russia) Kosmos 2282 (Prognoz)	MOM	Current: Graveyard; Operational: Geosynchronous	Missile defence	In orbit	Unclear
6 July; 23:58	Retired from service on 1 October 1995					
8 July; 16:43	(United States) Space Shuttle Columbia		(United States) Kennedy LC-39A		(United States) United Space Alliance	
8 July; 16:43	(United States) STS-65	NASA	Low Earth	Microgravity research	23 July	Successful
8 July; 16:43	(United States) Spacelab Long Module 1	NASA	Low Earth (Columbia)	Spacelab IML-2	23 July	Successful
8 July; 16:43	(United States) EDO Pallet	NASA	Low Earth (Columbia)	Cryogenic mission extension pallet	23 July	Successful
8 July; 16:43	Crewed orbital flight with seven astronauts					
8 July; 23:05	(France) Ariane 4 (44L)		(France) Kourou ELA-2		(France) Arianespace	
8 July; 23:05	(United States) PanAmSat-2	PanAmSat	Geosynchronous	Communications	In orbit	Operational
8 July; 23:05	(Japan) Yuri-3N	NHK	Geosynchronous	Communications	In orbit	Operational
14 July; 05:13	(Russia) Kosmos-3M		(Russia) Plesetsk Site 133/3		(Russia) VKS	
14 July; 05:13	(Russia) Nadezhda-4	MO RF	Low Earth	Navigation/SAR	In orbit	Operational
20 July; 17:35	(Russia) Soyuz-U		(Russia) Plesetsk Site 43/4		(Russia) VKS	
20 July; 17:35	(Russia) Kosmos 2283 (Yantar)	MOM	Low Earth	Reconnaissance	29 September	Successful
21 July; 10:55	(China) Long March 3		(China) Xichang LC-1		(China) CASC	
21 July; 10:55	(China) Apstar 1	APT	Geosynchronous	Communications	In orbit	Operational
29 July; 09:30	(Russia) Soyuz-U		(Kazakhstan) Baikonur Site 31/6		(Russia) VKS	
29 July; 09:30	(Russia) Kosmos 2284 (Yantar)	MOM	Low Earth	Reconnaissance	11 September	Successful
=== August ===
2 August; 20:00	(Russia) Kosmos-3M		(Russia) Plesetsk Site 132/1		(Russia) VKS	
2 August; 20:00	(Russia) Kosmos 2285 (Taifun)	MO RF	Low Earth	Radar calibration	In orbit	Successful
3 August; 14:38	(United States) Pegasus		(United States) Stargazer, Edwards		(United States) Orbital Sciences	
3 August; 14:38	(United States) P90-6 APEX	US Air Force/STP	Low Earth	Technology development	In orbit	Successful
3 August; 23:57	(United States) Atlas IIA		(United States) Cape Canaveral LC-36A		(United States) Lockheed Martin	
3 August; 23:57	(United States) DirecTV-2	DirecTV	Current: Graveyard; Operational: Geosynchronous	Communications	In orbit	Successful
3 August; 23:57	Retired on 16 April 2007 and moved to graveyard orbit in May 2007					
5 August; 01:12	(Russia) Molniya-M		(Russia) Plesetsk Site 16/2		(Russia) VKS	
5 August; 01:12	(Russia) Kosmos 2286 (Oko)	MOM	Molniya	Missile defence	In orbit	Operational
10 August; 23:05	(France) Ariane 4 (44LP)		(France) Kourou ELA-2		(France) Arianespace	
10 August; 23:05	(Brazil) Brasilsat B1 (Star One B1)	Brasilsat	Geosynchronous	Communications	In orbit	Operational
10 August; 23:05	(Turkey) Türksat 1B	Türksat	Current: Graveyard; Operational: Geosynchronous	Communications	In orbit	Successful
11 August; 15:27	(Russia) Proton-K/DM-2		(Kazakhstan) Baikonur Site 81/23		(Russia) VKS	
11 August; 15:27	(Russia) Kosmos 2287 (GLONASS)	MOM	Medium Earth	Navigation	In orbit	Successful
11 August; 15:27	(Russia) Kosmos 2288 (GLONASS)	MOM	Medium Earth	Navigation	In orbit	Successful
11 August; 15:27	(Russia) Kosmos 2289 (GLONASS)	MOM	Medium Earth	Navigation	In orbit	Successful
23 August; 14:30	(Russia) Molniya-M		(Russia) Plesetsk Site 43/4		(Russia) VKS	
23 August; 14:30	(Russia) Molniya 3–46	MOM	Molniya	Communications	In orbit	Operational
25 August; 14:25	(Russia) Soyuz-U		(Kazakhstan) Baikonur Site 1/5		(Russia) VKS	
25 August; 14:25	(Russia) Progress M-24	Roskosmos	Low Earth (Mir)	Logistics	4 October; 22:41:48	Successful
25 August; 14:25	Minor issues with docking, low speed collision with Mir					
26 August; 12:00	(Ukraine) Zenit-2		(Kazakhstan) Baikonur Site 45/1		(Russia) VKS	
26 August; 12:00	(Russia) Kosmos 2290 (Orlets)	MO RF	Low Earth	Reconnaissance	4 April 1995	Successful
27 August; 08:58	(United States) Titan IVA (401)/Centaur		(United States) Cape Canaveral LC-41		(United States)	
27 August; 08:58	(United States) USA-105 (Mercury)	NRO	Geosynchronous	ELINT	In orbit	Operational
27 August; 23:10	(China) Long March 2E		(China) Xichang LC-2		(China) CASC	
27 August; 23:10	(Australia) Optus B3	Optus	Geosynchronous	Communications	In orbit	Operational
28 August; 07:50	(Japan) H-II		(Japan) Tanegashima LA-Y		(Japan) Mitsubishi Heavy Industries	
28 August; 07:50	(Japan) Kiku 6 (ETS-6)	NASDA	Intended: Geosynchronous; Actual: Geosynchronous transfer	Technology development	In orbit	Partial launch failure
28 August; 07:50	Apogee motor failed to ignite, some experiments successful					
29 August; 17:38	(United States) Atlas E		(United States) Vandenberg SLC-3W		(United States)	
29 August; 17:38	(United States) USA-106 (DMSP-5D1-F12)	US Air Force	Low Earth	Weather	In orbit	Operational
=== September ===
9 September; 00:29	(France) Ariane 4 (42L)		(France) Kourou ELA-2		(France) Arianespace	
9 September; 00:29	(United States) Telstar 402	AT&T Skynet	Planned: Geosynchronous; Actual: Geosynchronous transfer	Communications	14 November 2004	Satellite failure
9 September; 00:29	Satellite exploded during propellant system pressurisation					
9 September; 22:22	(United States) Space Shuttle Discovery		(United States) Kennedy LC-39B		(United States) United Space Alliance	
9 September; 22:22	(United States) STS-64	NASA	Low Earth	Microgravity experiments	20 September; 21:11	Successful
9 September; 22:22	(United States) SPARTAN-201	NASA	Low Earth	Astronomy	20 September; 21:11	Successful
9 September; 22:22	Crewed orbital flight with six astronauts;SPARTAN deployed from Discovery on 13 September and retrieved on 15 September					
21 September; 17:53	(Russia) Proton-K/DM-2		(Kazakhstan) Baikonur Site 200/39		(Russia) VKS	
21 September; 17:53	(Russia) Kosmos 2291 (Potok)	MOM	Geosynchronous	Communications	In orbit	Operational
27 September; 14:00	(Russia) Kosmos-3M		(Russia) Plesetsk Site 132		(Russia) VKS	
27 September; 14:00	(Russia) Kosmos 2292 (Taifun)	MO RF	Low Earth	Radar calibration	In orbit	Successful
30 September; 11:16	(United States) Space Shuttle Endeavour		(United States) Kennedy LC-39A		(United States) United Space Alliance	
30 September; 11:16	(United States) STS-68	NASA	Low Earth	Radar mapping	11 October; 17:03	Successful
30 September; 11:16	(United States) Spacelab Pallet	NASA	Low Earth (Endeavour)	Spacelab SRL-2	11 October; 17:03	Successful
30 September; 11:16	Crewed orbital flight with six astronauts					
=== October ===
3 October; 22:42	(Russia) Soyuz-U2		(Kazakhstan) Baikonur Site 1/5		(Russia) VKS	
3 October; 22:42	(Russia) Soyuz TM-20	Roskosmos	Low Earth (Mir)	Mir EO-17	2 March 1995	Successful
3 October; 22:42	Crewed orbital flight with three cosmonauts					
6 October; 06:35	(United States) Atlas IIAS		(United States) Cape Canaveral LC-36B		(United States) Lockheed Martin	
6 October; 06:35	(United Nations) Intelsat 703	Intelsat	Geosynchronous	Communications	In orbit	Operational
8 October; 01:07	(France) Ariane 4 (44L)		(France) Kourou ELA-2		(France) Arianespace	
8 October; 01:07	(Mexico) Solidaridad 2	Tele Mex	Geosynchronous	Communications	In orbit	Operational
8 October; 01:07	(Thailand) Thaicom 2	Shinawat	Geosynchronous	Communications	In orbit	Operational
11 October; 14:30	(Ukraine) Tsyklon-3		(Russia) Plesetsk Cosmodrome Site 32/2		(Russia) VKS	
11 October; 14:30	(Russia) Okean-O1-7	Roskosmos	Low Earth	Oceanography	In orbit	Successful
13 October; 16:19	(Russia) Proton-K/DM-2M		(Kazakhstan) Baikonur Site 200/39		(Russia) VKS	
13 October; 16:19	(Russia) Ekspress-1	SCO	Geosynchronous	Communications	In orbit	Successful
15 October; 15:05	(India) PSLV		(India) Sriharikota FLP		(India) ISRO	
15 October; 15:05	(India) IRS-P2	ISRO	Sun-synchronous	Observation	In orbit	Successful
31 October; 14:30	(Russia) Proton-K/DM-2		(Kazakhstan) Baikonur Site 81/23		(Russia) VKS	
31 October; 14:30	(Russia) Elektro 1	MOM	Geosynchronous	Weather	In orbit	Spacecraft failure
31 October; 14:30	No useful imagery returned due to sensor malfunction and was written off in 1998					
=== November ===
1 November; 00:37	(France) Ariane 4 (42P)		(France) Kourou ELA-2		(France) Arianespace	
1 November; 00:37	(Luxembourg) Astra 1D	SES Astra	Geosynchronous	Communications	In orbit	Operational
1 November; 09:31	(United States) Delta II (7925–10)		(United States) Cape Canaveral LC-17B		(United States) Boeing IDS	
1 November; 09:31	(United States) WIND	NASA	Earth-Sun L_{1} halo	Solar	In orbit	Successful
2 November; 01:04	(Ukraine) Tsyklon-2		(Kazakhstan) Baikonur Site 90		(Russia) VKS	
2 November; 01:04	(Russia) Kosmos 2293 (EORSAT)	MO RF	Low Earth	SIGINT	13 May 1996	Successful
3 November; 00:37	(United States) Space Shuttle Atlantis		(United States) Kennedy LC-39A		(United States) United Space Alliance	
3 November; 00:37	(United States) STS-66	NASA	Low Earth	Solar astronomy	14 November	Successful
3 November; 00:37	(United States) Spacelab Pallet	NASA	Low Earth (Atlantis)	Spacelab ATLAS-3	14 November	Successful
3 November; 00:37	(Germany) CRISTA-SPAS	DLR	Low Earth	Atmospheric	14 November	Successful
3 November; 00:37	Crewed orbital flight with six astronauts; CRISTA-SPAS deployed on 4 November and retrieved on 12 November; Final solo (non-space station) flight of Atlantis until STS-125 in May 2009					
4 November; 05:47	(Ukraine) Zenit-2		(Kazakhstan) Baikonur Site 45/1		(Russia) VKS	
4 November; 05:47	(Russia) Resurs-O1-3	Roskosmos	Low Earth	Earth resources	In orbit	Successful
11 November; 19:15	(Russia) Soyuz-U		(Kazakhstan) Baikonur Site 1/5		(Russia) VKS	
11 November; 19:15	(Russia) Progress M-25	Roskosmos	Low Earth (Mir)	Logistics	16 February 1995; 16:45:00	Successful
20 November; 00:39	(Russia) Proton-K/DM-2		(Kazakhstan) Baikonur Site 200/39		(Russia) VKS	
20 November; 00:39	(Russia) Kosmos 2294 (GLONASS)	MOM	Medium Earth	Navigation	In orbit	Operational
20 November; 00:39	(Russia) Kosmos 2295 (GLONASS)	MOM	Medium Earth	Navigation	In orbit	Operational
20 November; 00:39	(Russia) Kosmos 2296 (GLONASS)	MOM	Medium Earth	Navigation	In orbit	Operational
24 November; 09:15	(Ukraine) Zenit-2		(Kazakhstan) Baikonur Site 45/1		(Russia) VKS	
24 November; 09:15	(Russia) Kosmos 2297 (Tselina)	MO RF	Low Earth	SIGINT	In orbit	Operational
29 November; 02:54	(Ukraine) Tsyklon-3		(Russia) Plesetsk Site 32/2		(Russia) VKS	
29 November; 02:54	(Russia) Geo-IK	Roskosmos	Low Earth	Geodesy	In orbit	Successful
29 November; 10:21	(United States) Atlas IIA		(United States) Cape Canaveral LC-36A		(United States) Lockheed Martin	
29 November; 10:21	(United States) Orion 1	Orion	Geosynchronous	Communications	In orbit	Operational
29 November; 17:02	(China) Long March 3A		(China) Xichang LA-2		(China) CASC	
29 November; 17:02	(China) Zhongxing-5	Chinasat	Geosynchronous	Technology demonstration	In orbit	Satellite failure
29 November; 17:02	First DFH-3 prototype; propulsion system malfunctioned during on-orbit positioning manoeuvres					
=== December ===
1 December; 22:57	(France) Ariane 4 (42P)		(France) Kourou ELA-2		(France) Arianespace	
1 December; 22:57	(United States) PanAmSat 3	PanAmSat	Intended: Geosynchronous	Communications	1 December	Launch failure
1 December; 22:57	Third stage malfunction					
14 December; 14:21	(Russia) Molniya-M		(Russia) Plesetsk Site 43/4		(Russia) VKS	
14 December; 14:21	(Russia) Molniya 1–88	MOM	Molniya	Communications	In orbit	Operational
16 December; 12:00	(Russia) Proton-K/DM-2		(Kazakhstan) Baikonur Site 81/23		(Russia) VKS	
16 December; 12:00	(Russia) Luch	MOM	Geosynchronous	Communications	In orbit	Successful
16 December; 12:00	Retired on 1 August 1998					
20 December; 05:11	(Russia) Kosmos-3M		(Russia) Plesetsk Site 132/1		(Russia) VKS	
20 December; 05:11	(Russia) Kosmos 2298 (Strela-2M)	MO RF	Low Earth	Communications	In orbit	Successful
22 December; 22:19	(United States) Titan IVA (402)/IUS		(United States) Cape Canaveral LC-40		(United States) Lockheed Martin	
22 December; 22:19	(United States) USA-107 (DSP)	US Air Force	Geosynchronous	Missile defence	In orbit	Operational
26 December; 03:01	(Russia) Rokot		(Kazakhstan) Baikonur Site 175/59		(Russia) VKS	
26 December; 03:01	(Russia) Radio-ROSTRO RS-15	Roskosmos	Low Earth	Amateur radio	In orbit	Successful
26 December; 22:26	(Ukraine) Tsyklon-3		(Russia) Plesetsk Site 32/2		(Russia) VKS	
26 December; 22:26	(Russia) Kosmos 2299 (Strela-3)	MO RF	Low Earth	Communications	In orbit	Operational
26 December; 22:26	(Russia) Kosmos 2300 (Strela-3)	MO RF	Low Earth	Communications	In orbit	Operational
26 December; 22:26	(Russia) Kosmos 2301 (Strela-3)	MO RF	Low Earth	Communications	In orbit	Operational
26 December; 22:26	(Russia) Kosmos 2302 (Strela-3)	MO RF	Low Earth	Communications	In orbit	Operational
26 December; 22:26	(Russia) Kosmos 2303 (Strela-3)	MO RF	Low Earth	Communications	In orbit	Operational
26 December; 22:26	(Russia) Kosmos 2304 (Strela-3)	MO RF	Low Earth	Communications	In orbit	Operational
28 December; 11:31	(Russia) Proton-K/DM-2		(Kazakhstan) Baikonur Site 81/23		(Russia) VKS	
28 December; 11:31	(Russia) Raduga 32	MOM	Geosynchronous	Communications	In orbit	Operational
29 December; 11:30	(Russia) Soyuz-U2		(Kazakhstan) Baikonur Site 31/6		(Russia) VKS	
29 December; 11:30	(Russia) Kosmos 2305 (Yantar)	MOM	Low Earth	Reconnaissance	18 December 1995	Successful
30 December; 10:02	(United States) Atlas E/Star 37		(United States) Vandenberg SLC-3W		(United States)	
30 December; 10:02	(United States) NOAA-14 (NOAA-K)	NOAA	Low Earth	Weather	In orbit	Successful

- ← Jan
- Feb
- Mar
- Apr
- May
- Jun
- Jul
- Aug
- Sep
- Oct
- Nov
- Dec →

== Suborbital launches ==
- ← Jan
- Feb
- Mar
- Apr
- May
- Jun
- Jul
- Aug
- Sep
- Oct
- Nov
- Dec →

Date and time (UTC)	Rocket	Flight number	Launch site		LSP	
Date and time (UTC)	Payload (⚀ = CubeSat)	Operator	Orbit	Function	Decay (UTC)	Outcome
Date and time (UTC)	Remarks					
=== January-March ===
20 January	(United States) UGM-133 Trident II		(United States) Submarine, Eastern Range		(United States) US Navy	
20 January	(United States) FCET-10	US Navy	Suborbital	Missile test	20 January	Successful
20 January	(United States) UGM-133 Trident II		(United States) Submarine, Eastern Range		(United States) US Navy	
20 January	(United States) FCET-10	US Navy	Suborbital	Missile test	20 January	Successful
20 January	(United States) UGM-133 Trident II		(United States) Submarine, Eastern Range		(United States) US Navy	
20 January	(United States) FCET-10	US Navy	Suborbital	Missile test	20 January	Successful
20 January	(United States) UGM-133 Trident II		(United States) Submarine, Eastern Range		(United States) US Navy	
20 January	(United States) FCET-10	US Navy	Suborbital	Missile test	20 January	Successful
30 January; 22:00	(Canada) Black Brant VIIIC		(United States) Poker Flat		(United States) NASA	
30 January; 22:00	(United States)	NASA	Suborbital	Plasma	30 January	Successful
2 February	(United States) LGM-30G Minuteman III		(United States) Vandenberg LF-26		(United States) US Air Force	
2 February	(United States) GT-154GB	US Air Force	Suborbital	Missile test	2 February	Successful
9 February; 23:43	(Canada) Black Brant IX		(Norway) Andøya		(United States) NASA	
9 February; 23:43	(United States) PULSAUR-2	NASA	Suborbital	Plasma	9 February	Successful
9 February; 23:43	Apogee: 300 kilometres (190 mi)					
10 February; 05:35	(Canada) Black Brant 9CM1		(United States) White Sands LC-36		(United States)	
10 February; 05:35	(Canada) (United States) GEMINI	CSA/NASA	Suborbital	Plasma/Aeronomy	10 February	Successful
10 February; 05:35	Apogee: 245 kilometres (152 mi)					
12 February; 13:08	(United States) Nike Tomahawk		(United States) Poker Flat		(United States) NASA	
12 February; 13:08	(United States)	NASA	Suborbital	Plasma	12 February	Successful
12 February; 13:08	Apogee: 270 kilometres (170 mi)					
12 February; 13:12	(United States) Nike Tomahawk		(United States) Poker Flat		(United States) NASA	
12 February; 13:12	(United States)	NASA	Suborbital	Plasma	12 February	Successful
12 February; 13:12	Apogee: 270 kilometres (170 mi)					
12 February; 13:16	(Canada) Black Brant VIIIC		(United States) Poker Flat		(United States) NASA	
12 February; 13:16	(United States)	NASA	Suborbital	Plasma	12 February	Successful
12 February; 13:16	Apogee: 242 kilometres (150 mi)					
15 February; 16:18	(United States) Storm		(United States) White Sands SULF		(United States) US Air Force	
15 February; 16:18	(United States) ERINT GTF-3	US Air Force	Suborbital	Target	15 February	Successful
15 February; 16:18	Apogee: 200 kilometres (120 mi)					
15 February; 23:52	(Japan) S-310		(Norway) Andøya		(Japan) ISAS	
15 February; 23:52	(Japan)	ISAS	Suborbital	Aeronomy	16 February	Successful
15 February; 23:52	Apogee: 192 kilometres (119 mi)					
19 February; 12:13	(India) Agni-I		(India) Balasore		(India) DRDO	
19 February; 12:13	(India)	DRDO	Suborbital	Missile test	19 February	Successful
19 February; 12:13	Apogee: 300 kilometres (190 mi)					
1 March	(Canada) Black Brant 9CM1		(France) Centre d'Essais des Landes		(France) Matra	
1 March	(France) NOIR	Matra	Suborbital	Aeronomy	1 March	Successful
1 March	Apogee: 200 kilometres (120 mi)					
6 March; 08:21	(Canada) Black Brant XII		(United States) Poker Flat		(United States) NASA	
6 March; 08:21	(United States)	NASA	Suborbital	Auroral	6 March	Successful
6 March; 08:21	Apogee: 455 kilometres (283 mi)					
7 March; 09:11	(United States) Nike Orion		(United States) Poker Flat		(United States) NASA	
7 March; 09:11	(United States)	NASA	Suborbital	Plasma	7 March	Failure
7 March; 09:11	Apogee: 140 kilometres (87 mi)					
8 March; 03:50	(United States) LGM-118 Peacekeeper		(United States) Vandenberg LF-05		(United States) US Air Force	
8 March; 03:50		US Air Force	Suborbital	Missile test	8 March	Successful
8 March; 03:50	Apogee: 1,000 kilometres (620 mi)					
11 March; 06:50	(Canada) Black Brant IX		(United States) Poker Flat		(United States) NASA	
11 March; 06:50	(United States)	NASA	Suborbital	Plasma	11 March	Successful
11 March; 06:50	Apogee: 308 kilometres (191 mi)					
28 March	(United States) UGM-96 Trident I		(United States) Submarine, Eastern Range		(United States) US Navy	
28 March		US Navy	Suborbital	Missile test	28 March	Successful
28 March	FCET-44; Apogee: 1,000 kilometres (620 mi)					
28 March	(United States) UGM-96 Trident I		(United States) Submarine, Eastern Range		(United States) US Navy	
28 March		US Navy	Suborbital	Missile test	28 March	Successful
28 March	FCET-44; Apogee: 1,000 kilometres (620 mi)					
28 March	(United States) UGM-96 Trident I		(United States) Submarine, Eastern Range		(United States) US Navy	
28 March		US Navy	Suborbital	Missile test	28 March	Successful
28 March	FCET-44; Apogee: 1,000 kilometres (620 mi)					
28 March	(United States) UGM-96 Trident I		(United States) Submarine, Eastern Range		(United States) US Navy	
28 March		US Navy	Suborbital	Missile test	28 March	Successful
28 March	FCET-44; Apogee: 1,000 kilometres (620 mi)					
=== April-June ===
5 April; 18:22	(United States) Terrier-Orion		(United States) Wallops Island		(United States) NASA	
5 April; 18:22		NASA	Suborbital	Rocket test	5 April	Successful
5 April; 18:22	Apogee: 127 kilometres (79 mi)					
16 April; 01:22	(Spain) INTA-300B		(Spain) El Arenosillo		(Spain) INTA	
16 April; 01:22	(Spain)	INTA	Suborbital	Aeronomy	16 April	Successful
16 April; 01:22	Apogee: 156 kilometres (97 mi)					
17 April; 04:30	(Canada) Black Brant IX		(United States) White Sands LC-36		(United States) NASA	
17 April; 04:30	(United States)	NASA	Suborbital	Astronomy	17 April	Successful
17 April; 04:30	Apogee: 300 kilometres (190 mi)					
25 April; 20:45	(Canada) Black Brant IX		(United States) White Sands LC-36		(United States) NASA	
25 April; 20:45	(United States)	NASA	Suborbital	Solar astronomy	25 April	Successful
25 April; 20:45	Apogee: 300 kilometres (190 mi)					
3 May; 07:40	(United States) Nike Orion		(Sweden) Esrange		(Germany) DLR	
3 May; 07:40	(Germany) MINI-TEXUS 2	DLR	Suborbital	Microgravity research	3 May	Successful
3 May; 07:40	Apogee: 140 kilometres (87 mi)					
5 May; 04:15	(United Kingdom) Skylark 7		(Sweden) Esrange LA-S		(Germany) DASA	
5 May; 04:15	(Germany) TEXUS-32	DASA	Suborbital	Microgravity research	5 May	Successful
5 May; 04:15	Apogee: 235 kilometres (146 mi)					
17 May	(United States) LGM-118A Peacekeeper		(United States) Vandenberg LF-02		(United States) US Air Force	
17 May		US Air Force	Suborbital	Missile test	17 May	Successful
17 May	Apogee: 1,000 kilometres (620 mi)					
26 May	(United States) UGM-133 Trident II		(United Kingdom) HMS Vanguard, Eastern Range		(United Kingdom) Royal Navy	
26 May	(United Kingdom) DASO-1	Royal Navy	Suborbital	Missile test	26 May	Successful
26 May	Apogee: 1,000 kilometres (620 mi)					
4 June	(India) Prithvi		(India) Balasore		(India) DRDO	
4 June	(India)	DRDO	Suborbital	Missile test	4 June	Successful
4 June	Apogee: 100 kilometres (62 mi)					
6 June	(India) Prithvi		(India) Balasore		DRDO	
6 June	(India)	DRDO	Suborbital	Missile test	6 June	Successful
6 June	Apogee: 100 kilometres (62 mi)					
8 June	(United States) LGM-30G Minuteman III		(United States) Vandenberg LF-04		(United States) US Air Force	
8 June	(United States) GT-155GM	US Air Force	Suborbital	Missile test	8 June	Successful
8 June	Apogee: 1,300 kilometres (810 mi)					
20 June; 03:00	(United States) UGM-133 Trident II		(United Kingdom) HMS Vanguard, Eastern Range		(United Kingdom) Royal Navy	
20 June; 03:00	(United Kingdom) DASO-2	Royal Navy	Suborbital	Missile test	20 June	Successful
20 June; 03:00	Apogee: 1,000 kilometres (620 mi)					
22 June; 02:20	(United States) Nike Orion		(United States) Wallops Island		(United States) NASA	
22 June; 02:20	(United States)	NASA	Suborbital	Plasma	22 June	Successful
22 June; 02:20	Apogee: 140 kilometres (87 mi)					
22 June; 08:22	(Russia) RT-2PM Topol		(Russia) Plesetsk		(Russia) RVSN	
22 June; 08:22	(Russia)	RVSN	Suborbital	Missile test	22 June	Successful
22 June; 08:22	Apogee: 1,000 kilometres (620 mi)					
27 June; 07:40	(United States) Taurus-Orion		(United States) Poker Flat		(United States) NASA	
27 June; 07:40	(United States)	NASA	Suborbital	Plasma	27 June	Successful
27 June; 07:40	Apogee: 200 kilometres (120 mi)					
=== July-September ===
6 July	(United States) LGM-30G Minuteman III		(United States) Vandenberg LF-09		(United States) US Air Force	
6 July	(United States) GT-156GM	US Air Force	Suborbital	Missile test	6 July	Successful
6 July	Apogee: 1,300 kilometres (810 mi)					
8 July	(United States) MGM-29 Sergeant		(United States) Wallops Island		(United States) BMDO	
8 July	(United States) MSTI-2	BMDO	Suborbital	Target	8 July	Successful
8 July	Apogee: 100 kilometres (62 mi)					
16 July; 00:23	(United States) Nike Orion		(United States) Wallops Island		(United States) NASA	
16 July; 00:23	(United States)	NASA	Suborbital	Ionospheric	16 July	Successful
16 July; 00:23	Apogee: 140 kilometres (87 mi)					
20 July; 05:53	(Canada) Black Brant IX		(United States) White Sands LC-36		(United States) NASA	
20 July; 05:53	(United States)	NASA	Suborbital	Aeronomy	20 July	Successful
20 July; 05:53	Apogee: 163 kilometres (101 mi)					
22 July	(United States) UGM-27 Polaris (STARS)		(United States) Barking Sands		(United States) US Air Force	
22 July	(United States) ODES	US Air Force	Suborbital	Target	22 July	Successful
22 July	Apogee: 1,000 kilometres (620 mi)					
28 July; 22:39	(United States) Nike Orion		(Norway) Andøya		(Germany) DLR	
28 July; 22:39	(Germany) Echo 94 F-102 DUSTY	DLR	Suborbital	Ionospheric	28 July	Successful
28 July; 22:39	Apogee: 140 kilometres (87 mi)					
31 July; 00:50	(United States) Nike Orion		(Norway) Andøya		(Germany) DLR	
31 July; 00:50	(Germany) Echo 94 F-103 DUSTY	DLR	Suborbital	Ionospheric	31 July	Successful
31 July; 00:50	Apogee: 140 kilometres (87 mi)					
8 August	(United States) MGM-29 Sergeant		(United States) Wallops Island		(United States) US Navy	
8 August	(United States) CEC	US Navy	Suborbital	Target	8 August	Successful
8 August	Apogee: 100 kilometres (62 mi)					
12 August; 00:53	(United States) Nike Orion		(Norway) Andøya		(Germany) DLR	
12 August; 00:53	(Germany) Echo 94 F-101 CONE	DLR	Suborbital	Ionospheric	12 August	Successful
12 August; 00:53	Apogee: 140 kilometres (87 mi)					
16 August; 03:25	(Canada) Black Brant IX		(United States) White Sands LC-36		(United States) NASA	
16 August; 03:25	(United States)	NASA	Suborbital	Aeronomy	16 August	Successful
16 August; 03:25	Apogee: 300 kilometres (190 mi)					
18 August	(United States) MGM-29 Sergeant		(United States) Wallops Island		(United States) BMDO	
18 August	(United States) JTF-95 MSTI	BMDO	Suborbital	Target	18 August	Successful
18 August	Apogee: 100 kilometres (62 mi)					
19 August; 15:08	(United States) Nike Orion		(Brazil) Alcântara		(United States) NASA	
19 August; 15:08	(United States) MALTED/CADRE	NASA	Suborbital	Ionospheric	19 August	Successful
19 August; 15:08	Apogee: 140 kilometres (87 mi)					
20 August; 02:18	(United States) Nike Orion		(Brazil) Alcântara		(United States) NASA	
20 August; 02:18	(United States) MALTED/CADRE	NASA	Suborbital	Ionospheric	20 August	Successful
20 August; 02:18	Apogee: 140 kilometres (87 mi)					
24 August; 13:45	(United States) Nike Orion		(Brazil) Alcântara		(United States) NASA	
24 August; 13:45	(United States) MALTED/CADRE	NASA	Suborbital	Ionospheric	24 August	Successful
24 August; 13:45	Apogee: 140 kilometres (87 mi)					
25 August; 01:43	(United States) Nike Orion		(Brazil) Alcântara		(United States) NASA	
25 August; 01:43	(United States) MALTED/CADRE	NASA	Suborbital	Ionospheric	25 August	Successful
25 August; 01:43	Apogee: 140 kilometres (87 mi)					
7 September; 14:41	(United States) LGM-118 Peacekeeper		(United States) Vandenberg LF-05		(United States) US Air Force	
7 September; 14:41		US Air Force	Suborbital	Missile test	7 September	Successful
7 September; 14:41	Apogee: 1,000 kilometres (620 mi)					
9 September; 13:33	(Canada) Black Brant VC		(Brazil) Alcântara		(United States) NASA	
9 September; 13:33	(United States)	NASA	Suborbital	Ionospheric	9 September	Successful
9 September; 13:33	Apogee: 250 kilometres (160 mi)					
12 September; 15:34	(United States) Nike Orion		(United States) White Sands		(United States) NASA	
12 September; 15:34	(United States) CWAS-35	NASA	Suborbital	Aeronomy	12 September	Successful
12 September; 15:34	Apogee: 140 kilometres (87 mi)					
15 September; 15:00	(United States) Nike Orion		(United States) White Sands		(United States) NASA	
15 September; 15:00	(United States) CWAS-36	NASA	Suborbital	Aeronomy	15 September	Successful
15 September; 15:00	Apogee: 140 kilometres (87 mi)					
15 September	(Israel) Jericho II		(Israel) Palmachim		(Israel) ISA	
15 September		ISA	Suborbital	Missile test	15 September	Failure
15 September	Apogee: 300 kilometres (190 mi)					
16 September; 04:00	(Japan) ST-735		(Japan) Kagoshima		(Japan) ISAS	
16 September; 04:00	(Japan) FIH	ISAS	Suborbital	Rocket test	16 September	Successful
16 September; 04:00	Apogee: 118 kilometres (73 mi)					
21 September; 13:56	(Canada) Black Brant VC		(Brazil) Alcântara		(United States) NASA	
21 September; 13:56	(United States)	NASA	Suborbital	Ionospheric	21 September	Successful
21 September; 13:56	Apogee: 250 kilometres (160 mi)					
23 September; 15:15	(Russia) RT-2PM Topol		(Russia) Plesetsk		(Russia) RVSN	
23 September; 15:15		RVSN	Suborbital	Missile test	23 September	Successful
23 September; 15:15	Apogee: 1,000 kilometres (620 mi)					
23 September; 21:15	(United States) Nike Tomahawk		(Brazil) Alcântara		(United States) NASA	
23 September; 21:15	(United States)	NASA	Suborbital	Ionospheric	23 September	Successful
23 September; 21:15	Apogee: 270 kilometres (170 mi)					
23 September; 21:17	(United States) Nike Tomahawk		(Brazil) Alcântara		(United States) NASA	
23 September; 21:17	(United States)	NASA	Suborbital	Ionospheric	23 September	Successful
23 September; 21:17	Apogee: 270 kilometres (170 mi)					
24 September; 21:15	(United States) Nike Tomahawk		(Brazil) Alcântara		(United States) NASA	
24 September; 21:15	(United States)	NASA	Suborbital	Ionospheric	24 September	Successful
24 September; 21:15	Apogee: 270 kilometres (170 mi)					
24 September; 21:17	(United States) Nike Tomahawk		(Brazil) Alcântara		(United States) NASA	
24 September; 21:17	(United States)	NASA	Suborbital	Ionospheric	24 September	Successful
24 September; 21:17	Apogee: 270 kilometres (170 mi)					
=== October-December ===
4 October; 18:58	(Canada) Black Brant IX		(United States) White Sands LC-36		(United States) NASA	
4 October; 18:58	(United States) PIMS	NASA	Suborbital	Ionospheric	4 October	Successful
4 October; 18:58	Apogee: 300 kilometres (190 mi)					
5 October; 08:00	(United States) LGM-30G Minuteman III		(United States) Vandenberg LF-04		(United States) US Air Force	
5 October; 08:00	(United States) GT-157GM	US Air Force	Suborbital	Missile test	5 October	Successful
5 October; 08:00	Apogee: 1,300 kilometres (810 mi)					
6 October; 13:22	(Canada) Black Brant VC		(Brazil) Alcântara		(United States) NASA	
6 October; 13:22	(United States)	NASA	Suborbital	Ionospheric	6 October	Failure
6 October; 13:22	Apogee: 250 kilometres (160 mi)					
14 October; 22:25	(Canada) Black Brant X		(Brazil) Alcântara		(United States) NASA	
14 October; 22:25	(United States) H.Alt Spread F	NASA	Suborbital	Ionospheric	14 October	Successful
14 October; 22:25	Apogee: 956 kilometres (594 mi)					
15 October; 13:41	(Canada) Black Brant VC		(Brazil) Alcântara		(United States) NASA	
15 October; 13:41	(United States) H.Alt Spread F	NASA	Suborbital	Ionospheric	15 October	Successful
15 October; 13:41	Apogee: 250 kilometres (160 mi)					
21 October	(United States) UGM-96 Trident I		(United States) Submarine, Eastern Range		(United States) US Navy	
21 October	(United States) DASO-33	US Navy	Suborbital	Missile test	21 October	Successful
21 October	Apogee: 1,000 kilometres (620 mi)					
3 November; 18:45	(Canada) Black Brant IX		(United States) White Sands LC-36		(United States) NASA	
3 November; 18:45	(United States) NCAR/CU-5	NASA	Suborbital	Ionospheric	3 November	Successful
3 November; 18:45	Apogee: 231 kilometres (144 mi)					
3 November; 19:15	(Canada) Black Brant IX		(United States) White Sands LC-36		(United States) NASA	
3 November; 19:15	(United States) MSSTA	NASA	Suborbital	X-ray astronomy	3 November	Successful
3 November; 19:15	Apogee: 272 kilometres (169 mi)					
10 November; 07:30	(Russia) RT-2PM Topol		(Russia) Plesetsk		(Russia) RVSN	
10 November; 07:30		RVSN	Suborbital	Missile test	10 November	Successful
10 November; 07:30	Apogee: 1,000 kilometres (620 mi)					
22 November; 15:40	(Canada) Black Brant IX		(United States) White Sands LC-36		(United States) NASA	
22 November; 15:40	(United States)	NASA	Suborbital	Test flight	22 November	Successful
22 November; 15:40	Apogee: 300 kilometres (190 mi)					
24 November; 10:20	(Japan) S-310		(Norway) Andøya		(Japan) ISAS	
24 November; 10:20	(Japan)	ISAS	Suborbital	Aeronomy	24 November	Successful
24 November; 10:20	Apogee: 200 kilometres (120 mi)					
30 November; 10:30	(United Kingdom) Skylark 7		(Sweden) Esrange Area S		(Germany) DLR	
30 November; 10:30	(Germany) TEXUS 33	DASA	Suborbital	Microgravity	30 November	Successful
30 November; 10:30	Apogee: 267 kilometres (166 mi)					
1 December; 21:39	(Japan) S-520		(Norway) Andøya		(Japan) ISAS	
1 December; 21:39	(Japan)	ISAS	Suborbital	Auroral	1 December	Successful
1 December; 21:39	Apogee: 344 kilometres (214 mi)					
1 December	(United States) UGM-133 Trident II		(United States) Submarine, Eastern Range		(United States) US Navy	
1 December	(United States) DASO-13	US Navy	Suborbital	Missile test	1 December	Successful
1 December	Apogee: 1,000 kilometres (620 mi)					
3 December; 07:45	(Canada) Black Brant IX		(United States) White Sands LC-36		(United States) NASA	
3 December; 07:45	(United States)	NASA	Suborbital	Astronomy	3 December	Successful
3 December; 07:45	Apogee: 300 kilometres (190 mi)					
7 December	(United States) UGM-133 Trident II		(United States) Submarine, Eastern Range		(United States) US Navy	
7 December	(United States) FCET-45	US Navy	Suborbital	Missile test	7 December	Successful
7 December	Apogee: 1,000 kilometres (620 mi)					
7 December	(United States) UGM-133 Trident II		(United States) Submarine, Eastern Range		(United States) US Navy	
7 December	(United States) FCET-45	US Navy	Suborbital	Missile test	7 December	Successful
7 December	Apogee: 1,000 kilometres (620 mi)					
8 December	(Canada) Black Brant IX		(United States) White Sands		(Canada) CSA	
8 December	(Canada) CSAR-2	CSA	Suborbital	Microgravity	8 December	Successful
8 December	Apogee: 300 kilometres (190 mi)					
17 December; 02:55	(Canada) Black Brant IX		(United States) White Sands LC-36		(United States) NASA	
17 December; 02:55	(United States)	NASA	Suborbital	Astronomy	17 December	Successful
17 December; 02:55	Apogee: 300 kilometres (190 mi)					
20 December; 08:50	(Russia) RT-2UTTH Topol M		(Russia) Plesetsk		(Russia) RVSN	
20 December; 08:50		RVSN	Suborbital	Missile test	20 December	Successful
20 December; 08:50	Maiden flight of Topol M missile; Apogee: 1,000 kilometres (620 mi)					

- ← Jan
- Feb
- Mar
- Apr
- May
- Jun
- Jul
- Aug
- Sep
- Oct
- Nov
- Dec →

== Deep Space Rendezvous ==
Date (GMT)	Spacecraft	Event	Remarks
19 February	Clementine	Selenocentric orbit injection	400 kilometres (250 mi)
4 May	Clementine	Leaves Selenocentric orbit	
13 October	Magellan	Deliberately deorbited into the Venerian atmosphere	

== EVAs ==
Start date/time	Duration	End time	Spacecraft	Crew	Remarks
9 September; 07:00	5 hours 4 minutes	12:06	Mir EO-16; Kvant-2	(Russia) Yuri Malenchenko (Kazakhstan) Talgat Musabayev	Inspected a docking port on Kvant-1 for damage from a recent Progress and repaired a thermal blanket on Soyuz TM-19.
13 September; 06:30	6 hours 1 minute	12:32	Mir EO-16; Kvant-2	(Russia) Yuri Malenchenko (Kazakhstan) Talgat Musabayev	Continued construction work in preparation of moving solar arrays from the Kristall module to the Kvant-2 module.
16 September; 14:42	6 hours 51 minutes	21:33	STS-64; Discovery	(United States) Mark C. Lee (United States) Carl J. Meade	Untethered tests of SAFER EVA rescue device.
