= Tardigrades in space =

Model organism for space research

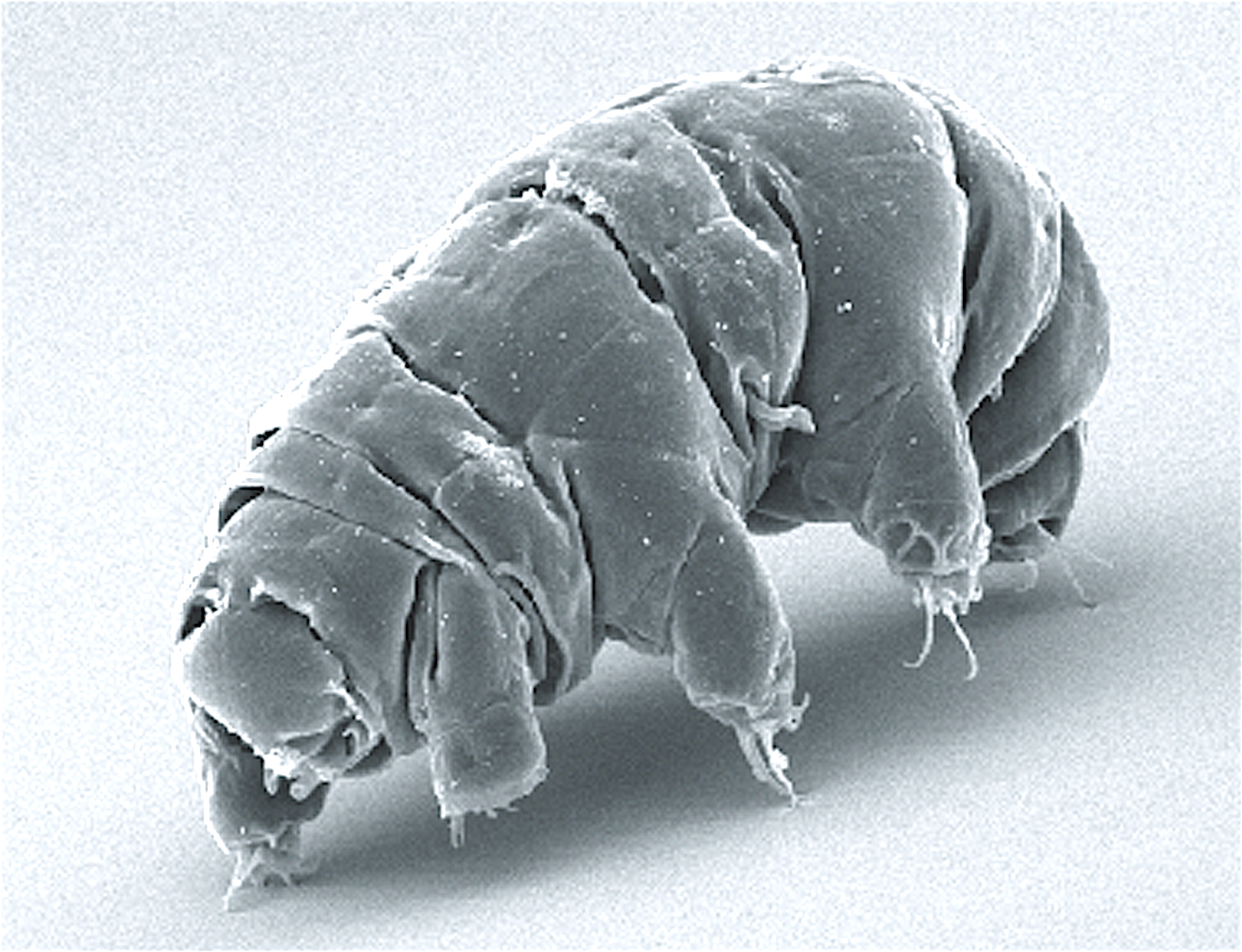
The tardigrade Milnesium tardigradum demonstrated its ability to survive the vacuum and ultraviolet radiation of space in the TARDIS experiment on the 2007 FOTON-M3 mission.

The use of tardigrades in space, first proposed in 1964 because of their extreme tolerance to radiation, began in 2007 with the FOTON-M3 mission in low Earth orbit, where they were exposed to space's vacuum for 10 days, and reanimated, just by rehydration, back on Earth. In 2011, tardigrades were on board the International Space Station on STS-134. In 2019, a capsule containing tardigrades was on board the Israeli lunar lander Beresheet which crashed on the Moon.

== Tardigrades ==
When dried, terrestrial tardigrades draw in their legs and go into a cryptobiotic 'tun' state. They quickly revive when re-wetted.

Tardigrades are small arthropods able to tolerate extreme environments. Many live in tufts of moss, such as on rooftops, where they get repeatedly dried out and rewetted. Others live in the Arctic or atop mountains, where they are exposed to cold. When dried, they go into a cryptobiotic 'tun' state in which metabolism is suspended. They have been described as the toughest animals on Earth. Their DNA is protected from damage, such as by radiation, by Dsup proteins.

== Proposals ==
In 1964, R.M. May and colleagues proposed that the tardigrade Macrobiotus areolatus would be a suitable model organism for space experiments because of its exceptional radiation tolerance.

In 2001, R. Bertolani and colleagues proposed tardigrades as a model for a study of animal survival in space. As terrestrial experiments on tardigrades proceeded, knowledge of their survival abilities grew, enabling K.I. Jönsson in 2007, and then other researchers such as Daiki Horikawa in 2008 and Roberto Guidetti in 2012, to present evidence that they would resist desiccation, radiation, heat, and cold, suiting them for astrobiological studies.

In 2008, F. Ono and colleagues suggested that tardigrades might be able to survive a journey through space on a meteorite, enabling panspermia, the transfer of life from one planet to another.

== Missions ==
=== BIOPAN on FOTON-M3, 2007 ===
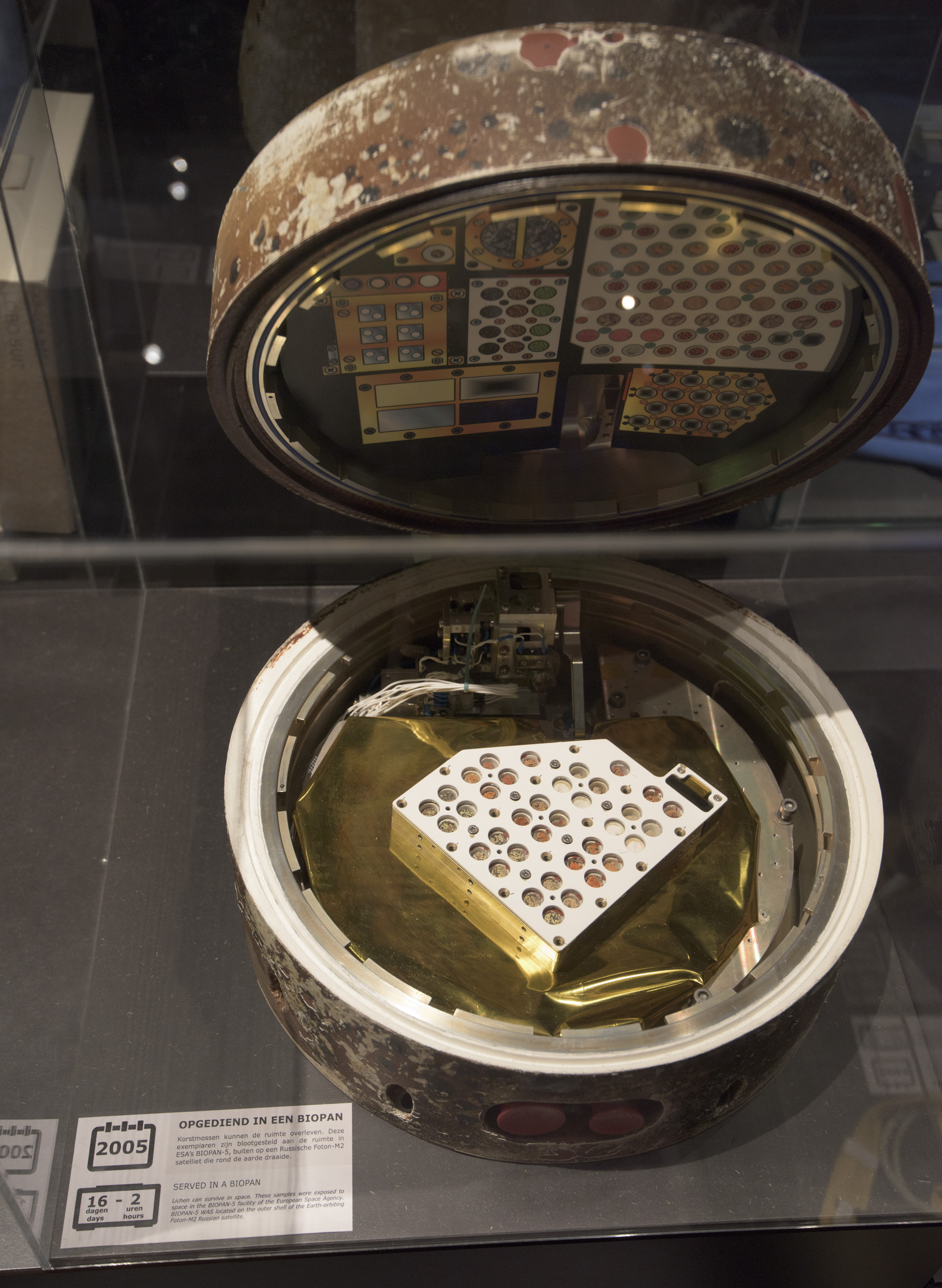
The 2007 FOTON-M3 mission carrying the BIOPAN astrobiology payload (illustrated) exposed tardigrades to vacuum, solar ultraviolet, or both, showing their ability to survive in the space environment.

Tardigrades have survived exposure to space. In 2007, dehydrated tardigrades were taken into low Earth orbit on the FOTON-M3 mission carrying the BIOPAN astrobiology payload. For 10 days, in the "Tardigrade Resistance to Space Effects" (TARSE) experiment, groups of Paramacrobiotus richtersi tardigrades, some of them previously dehydrated, some of them not, were exposed to the hard vacuum of space, or vacuum and solar ultraviolet radiation. Back on Earth, more than 68% of the subjects protected from solar ultraviolet radiation were reanimated within 30 minutes following rehydration; although subsequent mortality was high, many produced viable embryos.

In contrast, in the "Tardigrades in Space" (TARDIS) experiment, hydrated samples exposed to the combined effect of vacuum and full solar ultraviolet radiation had significantly reduced survival, with only three subjects of Milnesium tardigradum surviving. The space vacuum did not much affect egg-laying in either Richtersius coronifer or M. tardigradum, whereas UV radiation did reduce egg-laying in M. tardigradum.

The third FOTON-M3 experiment, "Rotifers, Tardigrades and Radiation" (RoTaRad) focused mainly on radiation survival.

=== LIFE prototype on STS-134, 2011 ===
In 2011, Angela Maria Rizzo and colleagues sent tardigrades and extremophiles on board the STS-134 Space Shuttle Endeavour mission to the International Space Station for the "Tardigrades in Space" (TARDIKISS) experiment. They concluded that microgravity and cosmic radiation "did not significantly affect survival of tardigrades in flight" and that tardigrades were useful in space research, with implications for astrobiology, where they should be suitable model organisms.

The mission was a prototype for the "Living Interplanetary Flight Experiment" (LIFE) which was to have travelled to the Martian moon Phobos on the Russian Fobos-Grunt spacecraft. The spacecraft however failed to leave Earth orbit and was destroyed.

=== Lunar lander Beresheet, 2019 ===
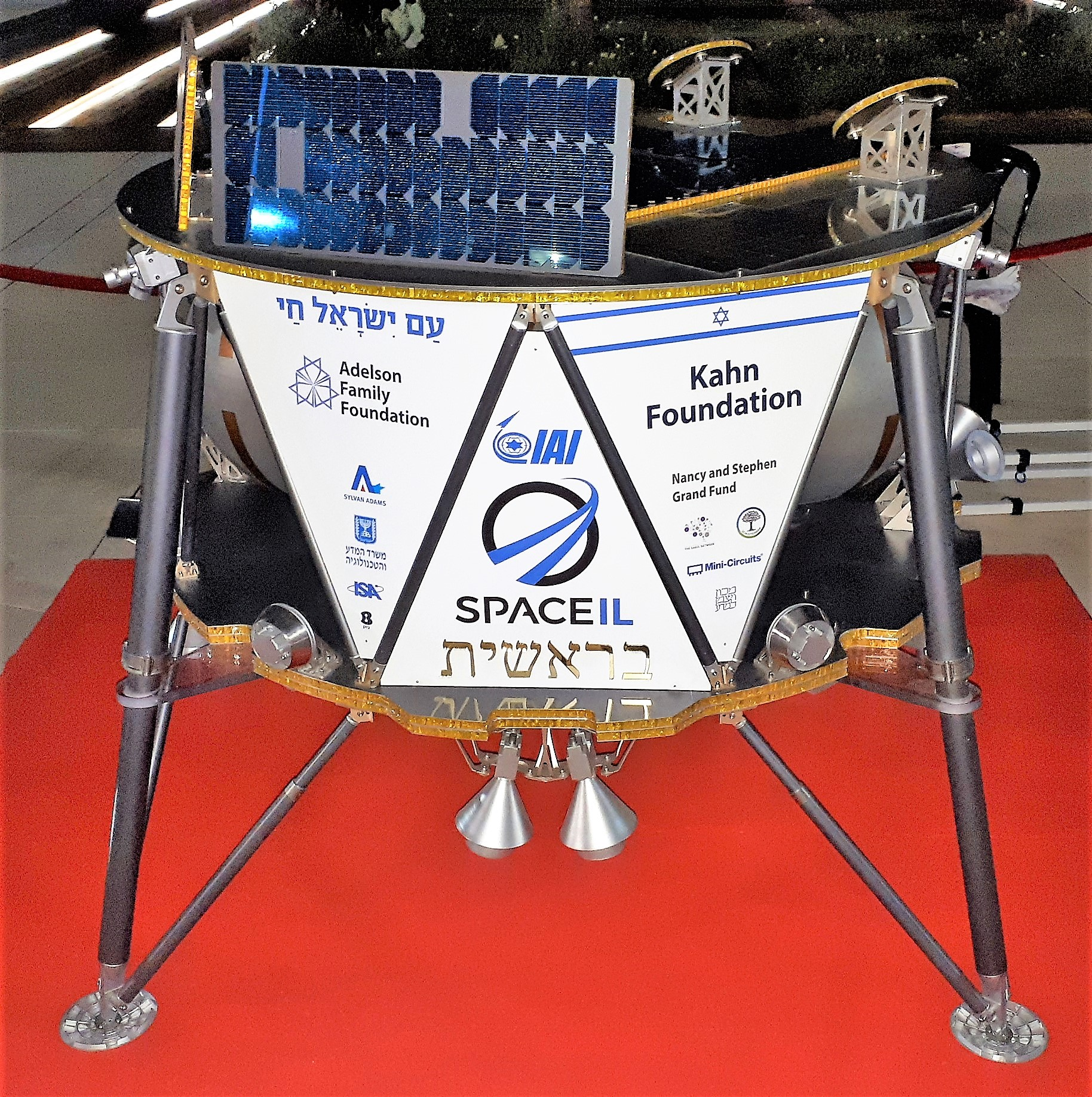
Model of the Beresheet Moon lander which crashed, probably destroying its tardigrade payload

In 2019, a capsule containing tardigrades in a cryptobiotic state was on board the Israeli lunar lander Beresheet which crashed on the Moon. They were described as unlikely to have survived the impact because the shock pressure of the crash would have been well above the 1.14 GPa that they have been measured as surviving. Despite tardigrades' ability to survive in space, they would still need food, lacking on the Moon, to be able to grow and reproduce. The possibility that tardigrades survived the crash attracted concern about contamination of the Moon with biological material. If they did survive the crash, they would not rehydrate because of the lack of liquid water on the Moon.

Spilling tardigrades across the Moon is legal. The Outer Space Treaty only explicitly bans weapons and experiments or tools that could interfere with other missions. Large space agencies typically follow guidelines for sterilizing mission equipment, but there is no single entity to globally enforce these rules.

== See also ==
- Animals in space
