= Yuri Usachov =

Russian cosmonaut (born 1957)

Yury Usachov
- Юрий Усачëв
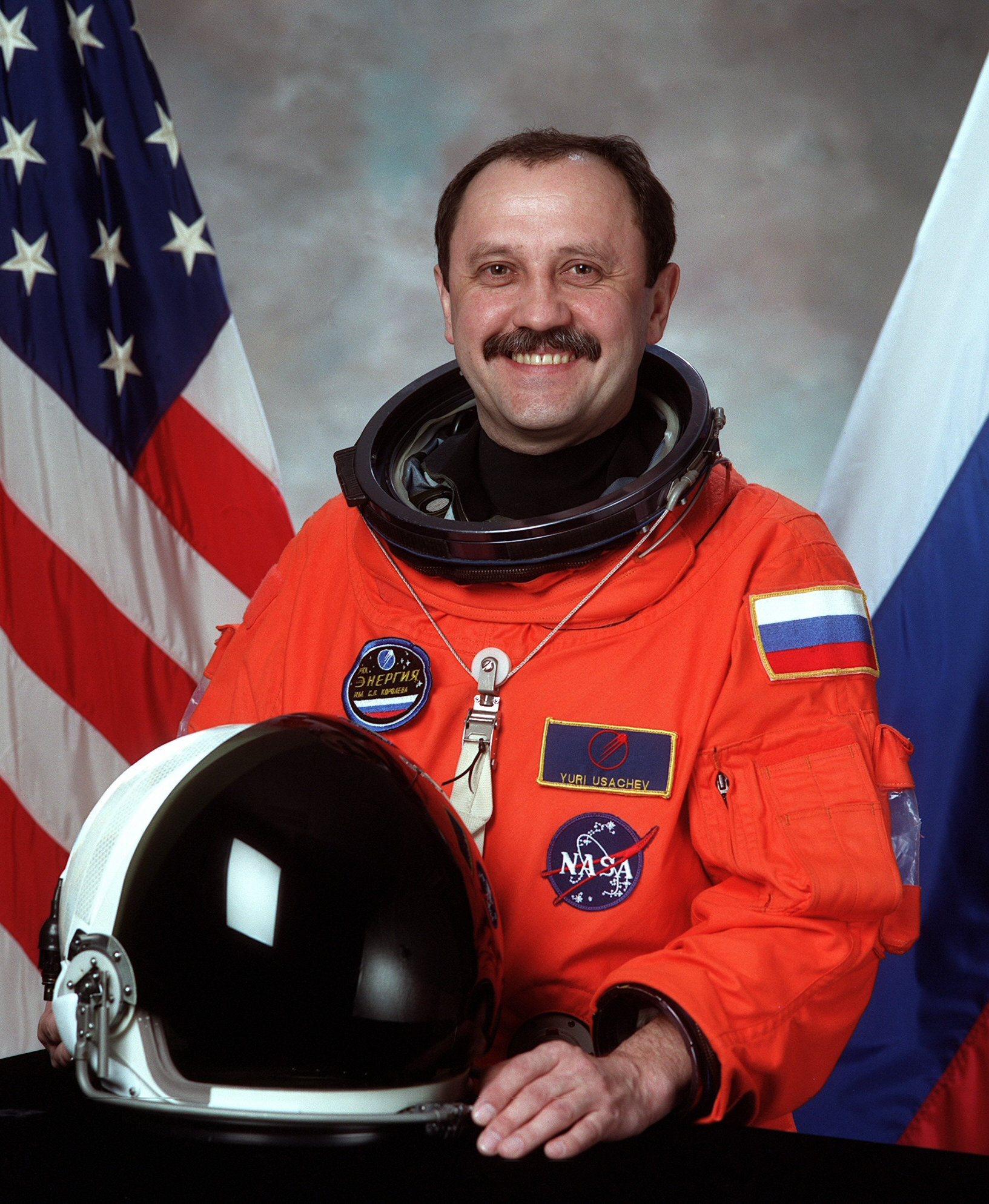
- Born: 9 October 1957 (age 68); Donetsk, Rostov Oblast, Russian SFSR, Soviet Union
- Occupation: Mechanical Engineer
- Awards: Hero of the Russian Federation
- Space career

Roscosmos cosmonaut
- Status: Retired
- Time in space: 552d 22h 25min
- Selection: 1989 NPOE Cosmonaut Group
- Total EVAs: 7 (6 during Mir EO-21, 1 during ISS Expedition 2)
- Total EVA time: 30h, 40m
- Missions: Soyuz TM-18 (Mir EO-15), Soyuz TM-23 (Mir EO-21), STS-101, Expedition 2 (STS-102 / STS-105)

Yury Vladimirovich Usachov (Russian: Юрий Владимирович Усачёв; born 9 October 1957) is a former cosmonaut who resides in Star City, Moscow. Usachov is a veteran of four spaceflights, including two long-duration missions on board the Mir Space Station and another on board the International Space Station. During his career, he also conducted seven spacewalks before his retirement on 5 April 2004.

== Personal ==
Married to Vera Sergeevna Usachova (née Nazarova) from the Kaliningrad. They have one daughter, Zhenya. His mother, Anna Grigorevna Usachova resides in Donetsk. His father is deceased. He has a brother, five years older, and a twin sister, five minutes older. He enjoys photography and video production.

== Education ==
Usachov graduated from the Donetsk Public School in 1975. In 1985, he graduated from the Moscow Aviation Institute with an engineering diploma.

== Experience ==
Upon graduation from the Aviation Institute, he went to work for Energia, participating in groups working with EVA training, future construction in space, public relations, and ergonomics.

== Cosmonaut career ==
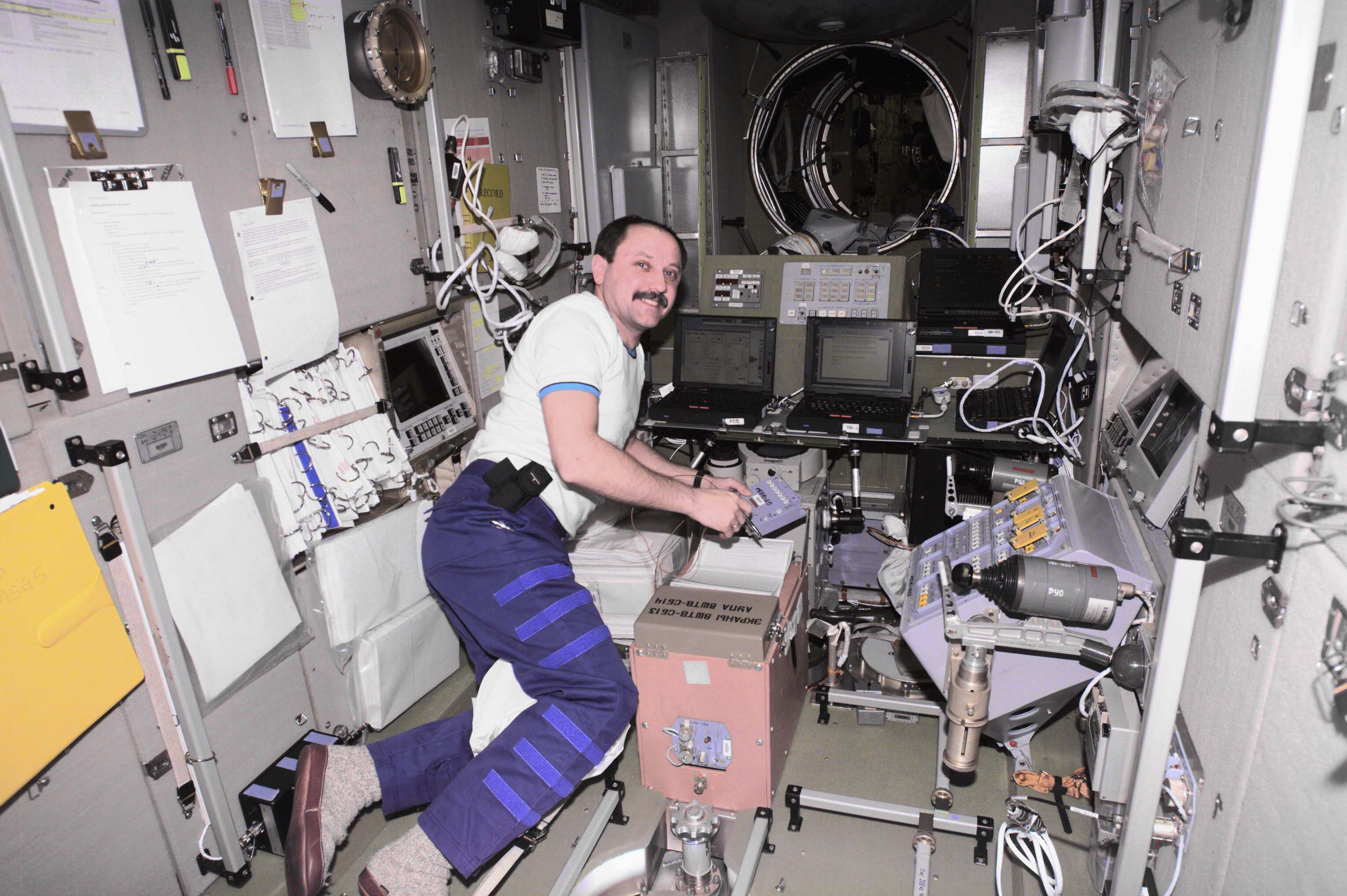
Yury Usachev, Expedition 2 commander, floats on board the Zvezda Service Module on the ISS.

In 1989, he was appointed to the position of cosmonaut candidate at the Cosmonaut Training Center. From 1989 to 1992, he underwent a course of general space training. He was a member of the back-up crew for the Mir-13, 14 and 19 missions. From January 8 to 9 July 1994, he served as Board Engineer on Space Station Mir.

=== Mir EO-15 ===
Usachov made his first trip into space on 8 January 1994. The Soyuz TM-18 spacecraft carrying Usachov with cosmonauts Viktor Afanasyev and Valeri Polyakov lifted off from the Baikonur Cosmodrome at 10:05:34 UTC. Usachov served as the flight engineer. After two days of solo flight, Soyuz TM-18 docked at the Kvant-1 module of the Mir space station on January 10 at 11:15 UTC. The three cosmonauts became the 15th resident crew of the Mir. Usachov joined as a flight engineer. He was on board Mir on January 14, when the departing Soyuz TM-17 spacecraft struck Kristall module two glancing blows during the customary inspection fly-around prior to the deorbit burn. After the incident, the EO-15 crew on Mir checked over Kristall and found no damage. During Usachov's stay three Progress spacecraft arrived at Mir. On 30 January, on March 24 and on May 24: Progress M-21, Progress M-22 and Progress M-23 spacecraft arrived at Mir. The Progress spacecraft delivered food, water, fuel, spare parts and equipment for the maintenance of Mir's systems and additional equipment for medical experiments.

Usachov and Afanasyev uneventfully returned to Earth on board the Soyuz TM-18 descent module, which landed 110 km north of Arkalyk in Kazakhstan at 10:32:35 GMT on 9 July 1994. Usachov flew on the Mir space station for 182 days.

=== Mir EO-21 ===
From 21 February to 2 September 1996, Usachov served as a Board Engineer of the Mir EO-21 expedition. The Soyuz TM-23 spacecraft carrying Usachov with cosmonaut Yuri Onufriyenko lifted off from the Baikonur Cosmodrome on 21 February 1996, at 12:34:05 UTC. After two days of autonomous flight, the Soyuz spacecraft docked with the Mir space station's forward-facing port on February 23 at 14:20 UTC. One month later, he and Onufriyenko were joined by NASA astronaut Shannon Lucid. During Mir-21 Usachev performed numerous research experiments. The new module Priroda, the seventh and final module of the Mir Space Station arrived on 26 April 1996. Its primary purpose was to conduct Earth resource experiments through remote sensing and to develop and verify remote sensing methods. During Mir EO-21 supplies arrived with the Progress M-31 spacecraft. Usachov and Onufriyenko were joined by French astronaut Claudie André-Deshays after the departure of Shannon Lucid.

On 2 September 1996, Usachov, Yuri Onufriyenko and Claudie André-Deshays returned to Earth on board the Soyuz TM-23 capsule. The spacecraft landed at 07:41:40 UTC 108 km south west of Akmola (Tselinograd). On board Soyuz TM-23 and Mir, Usachov spent 193 days in space.

=== STS 101 ===
Usachov next flew on STS-101, the third Shuttle mission devoted to International Space Station (ISS) construction. On 9 May 2000 at 6:11 a.m. EDT Space Shuttle Atlantis lifted off from Kennedy Space Center. Usachov served as a mission specialist and was seated down on Atlantis' middeck for both entry and landing. The primary mission objectives for STS-101 was to deliver supplies to the International Space Station, with the supplies hauled up using a Spacehab double module and Spacehab Integrated Cargo Carrier pallet, perform a spacewalk and then reboost the station from 230 to 250 statute miles (370 to 402 km). Usachov and NASA astronaut Susan Helms were the first crew members to enter the station. On Flight Days 5 and 6 of the mission, Usachov and Helms replaced two of six batteries in the Zarya module along with some associated battery-charging electronics. Usachov and Helms also installed a new Radio Telemetry System in the Zarya module, a memory unit that can store data on board when the station is not in communications with the ground. The new memory unit replaced one that was nearing the end of its planned operational lifetime. On Flight Day 8, he and Helms began backing out of the ISS by closing five hatches behind them. On the day, Usachov also took some time to talk with Russian media gathered at the Russian Mission Control Center. On the next day Usachov with other shuttle crewmembers continued stowing away equipment used over their time in orbit.

On May 29, Atlantis flew to a nighttime touchdown at KSC Runway 15 at 2:20 a.m. EDT after completing a 4,076,000 mile mission. Atlantis circled the globe 155 times for a mission duration of 9 days, 21 hours, 10 minutes.

=== Expedition 2 ===
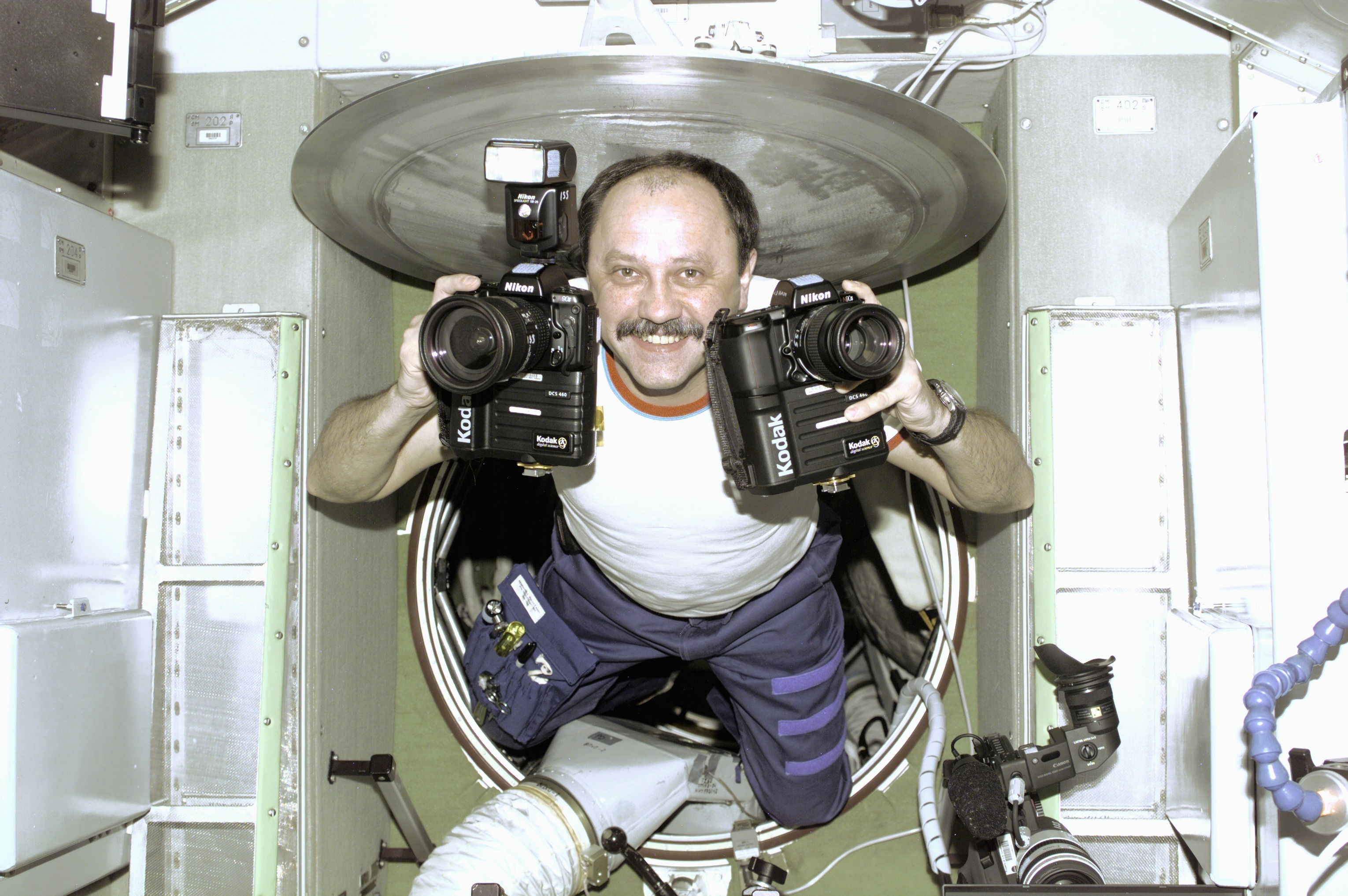
Usachev floats into the Zvezda Service Module equipped with cameras.

Usachov made his fourth trip into space on board Space Shuttle Discovery on STS-102. Launched from KSC on 8 March 2001, at 06:42 EST Discovery successfully docked with the ISS a day later on March 9 at 6:38 UTC. The Expedition 2 crew of Usachov and NASA astronauts Susan Helms and James Voss lived and worked aboard ISS for the next 167 days. Usachov was the commander of Expedition 2. During Expedition 2, research facilities launched to the ISS included a Human Research Facility, two EXPRESS (Expedite the Processing of Experiments to the Space Station) Racks, one of which contains the Active Rack Isolation System and the Payload Equipment Restraint System. They also prepared the Destiny laboratory to enable upcoming experiments to be conducted. A major focus was on gaining a better understanding of how to protect crew members from radiation while working and living in space. There were four Space Shuttle and one Soyuz missions to the ISS during Expedition 2: STS-102, STS-100, STS-104, STS-105 and Soyuz TM-32.

Usachov, Helms and Voss returned to Earth with the crew of STS-105 on 22 August 2001, on the Shuttle flight delivering the third Expedition crew.

=== Spacewalks ===
Usachov has performed seven career spacewalks. He performed six spacewalks during his stay on board the Mir Space Station and performed another internal spacewalk during his visit to the ISS as the commander of the Expedition 2.

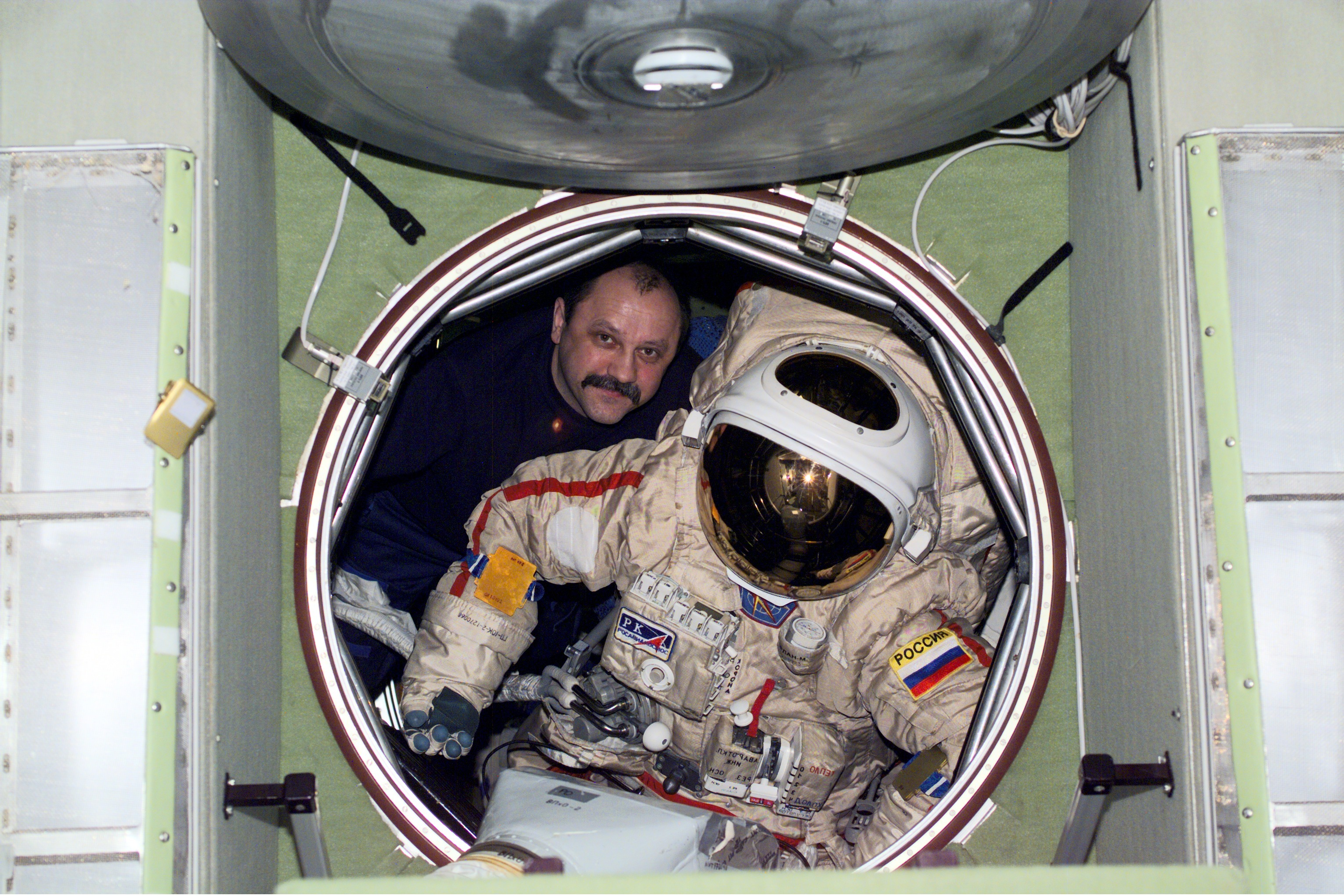
Usachov moves an Orlan spacesuit through the forward hatch of the Zvezda Service Module.

On 15 March 1996, Usachov performed his first career spacewalk. He and cosmonaut Onufriyenko started the spacewalk at 01:04 UTC. They installed the second Strela boom and prepared for Mir Cooperative Solar Array (MCSA) installation. The spacewalk lasted 5 hours and 51 minutes.

On 20 May 1996, Usachov performed his second career spacewalk. The spacewalk started at 22:50 UTC and ended at 04:10 UTC clocking 5 hours and 20 minutes. During the spacewalk, the two cosmonauts removed the Mir cooperative solar array (MCSA) from its stowed position on the exterior of the docking module at the base of the Kristall module. They used the Strela boom to reach and move the array to the Kvant-1 module. The two spacewalkers also inflated an aluminum and nylon pup-up model of a Pepsi Cola can, which they then filmed against the backdrop of Earth. The Pepsi Cola company paid for the procedure and planned to use the film in a television commercial. However, the commercial never aired—reportedly because Pepsi later changed the design of the can.

Usachov performed his third career spacewalk on 24 May 1996. He and cosmonaut Onufriyenko started the spacewalk at 22:50 UTC. They installed the MCSA on the Kvant-1 module. The spacewalk lasted 5 hours and 34 minutes.

On 30 May 1996, Usachov stepped outside the Mir Space Station to conduct his fourth career spacewalk. He and cosmonaut Onufriyenko started the spacewalk at 18:20 UTC. They installed the modular optoelectrical multispectral scanner (MOMS) outside Priroda and handrails on the Kvant-2 module to facilitate moving around outside the station during future extravehicular activities. MOMS was used to study the Earth's atmosphere and environment. The spacewalk lasted 4 hours and 20 minutes.

On 6 June 1996, Usachov performed his fifth career spacewalk. He and Onufriyenko installed micro-meteoroid detectors and replaced cassettes in the Swiss/Russian Komza experiment and installed the Particle Impact Experiment, the Mir Sample Return Experiment, and the SKK-11 cassette, which exposed construction materials to space conditions. The spacewalk lasted 3 hours and 34 minutes.

Usachov performed his sixth career spacewalk on 13 June 1996. The spacewalk started at 12:45 UTC and ended at 18:27 UTC clocking 5 hours and 42 minutes. During the spacewalk, Usachov and Onufriyenko installed the Rapana truss structure (an experiment mounting point) to the Kvant-1 module. The two cosmonauts also manually deployed the saddle-shaped traverse synthetic aperture radar antenna on Priroda. The large antenna had failed to open fully after receiving commands from inside Mir.

On 8 June 2001, Usachov performed his seventh career spacewalk. He and NASA astronaut James Voss donned spacesuits entered the small, spherical transfer compartment at the forward end of the Zvezda Service Module during an "internal" spacewalk. The spacewalk at the ISS was the first without the presence of a shuttle. Just after the ISS flew over the dark side of the Earth, they removed a hatch at the Earth-facing part of the compartment to open it to the vacuum of space and officially begin the spacewalk at 9:21 a.m CDT. During the 19-minute spacewalk which ended at 9:40 a.m. CDT, Usachov and Voss moved a docking cone from storage and using a rotating handle, installed it in the lower port hatch. The installation of the docking cone was necessary to prepare for the arrival of the Russian docking compartment.

== Honours and awards ==
- Hero of the Russian Federation (18 August 1994) - for courage and heroism displayed during prolonged space flight on the orbital scientific research complex Mir
- Order of Merit for the Fatherland;
  - 2nd class (10 April 2002) - for courage and professionalism shown during the implementation of space flight on the International Space Station
  - 3rd class (16 October 1996) - for the successful implementation of the international space flight on the orbital scientific research complex Mir and displaying courage and heroism
- Medal "For Merit in Space Exploration" (12 April 2011) - for the great achievements in the field of research, development and use of outer space, many years of diligent work, public activities
- Chevalier of the Legion of Honour (France, 1997)
- Pilot-Cosmonaut of the Russian Federation (18 August 1994)
- NASA Space Flight Medal
- NASA Distinguished Public Service Medal

== See also ==
- List of Heroes of the Russian Federation
