= Foton-M No.2 =

Unmanned spacecraft

- Mission type: Microgravity research
- Operator: Roskosmos; ESA
- COSPAR ID: 2005-020A
- SATCAT no.: 28686
- Mission duration: 16 days

Spacecraft properties
- Spacecraft type: Foton-M
- Launch mass: 600 kilograms (1,300 lb)
- Payload mass: 385 kilograms (849 lb)

Start of mission
- Launch date: 31 May 2004, 12:00:00 UTC
- Rocket: Soyuz-U
- Launch site: Baikonur 1/5

End of mission
- Landing date: 16 June 2004

Orbital parameters
- Reference system: Geocentric
- Regime: Low Earth
- Eccentricity: 0.00308
- Perigee altitude: 261 kilometres (162 mi)
- Apogee altitude: 302 kilometres (188 mi)
- Inclination: 63º
- Period: 93 minutes

Foton-M No.2 was an unmanned Foton-M spacecraft which carried a European payload for the European Space Agency (ESA). It was placed into orbit by a Russian Soyuz-U rocket launched at 12:00 UTC on 20 June 2005 from the Baikonur Cosmodrome in Kazakhstan by the Russian Space Agency (RKA). The Foton-M No.2 mission was a replacement for the failed Foton-M No.1 mission, which was lost in a launch failure on 15 October 2002.

The 600-kilogram (1,300 lb) payload carried by the spacecraft included 385 kilograms (849 lb) of experiments; consisting of 39 experiments in fluid physics, biology, material science, meteoritics, radiation dosimetry and exobiology (BIOPAN-5). Some of the experiments were designed by the ESA's student programme.

One notable experiment tested the ability of lichen to survive in space. It was successful, as the lichen survived over 14 days of exposure to space.
