= Foton-M No.4 =

Russian microgravity and bioscience research spacecraft

- Mission type: Microgravity research Bioscience
- Operator: Roskosmos
- COSPAR ID: 2014-041A
- SATCAT no.: 40095
- Mission duration: 60 days planned 44 days achieved

Spacecraft properties
- Spacecraft type: Foton-M 34KSM
- Manufacturer: TsSKB Progress
- Launch mass: 6,840 kilograms (15,080 lb)

Start of mission
- Launch date: 18 July 2014, 20:50:00 UTC
- Rocket: Soyuz-2-1a
- Launch site: Baikonur 31/6

End of mission
- Landing date: 1 September 2014, 09:18 UTC

Orbital parameters
- Reference system: Geocentric
- Regime: Low Earth
- Perigee altitude: 254 kilometres (158 mi)
- Apogee altitude: 531 kilometres (330 mi)
- Inclination: 64.88 degrees
- Period: 92.28 minutes
- Epoch: 1 September 2014, 03:20:32 UTC

Foton-M No.4 is a Russian microgravity and bioscience research spacecraft launched in July 2014 as part of the Foton programme. It is the fourth spacecraft in the Foton-M series, and the first to use the 34KSM configuration incorporating the equipment module from a Yantar satellite in place of that of a Zenit on earlier missions.

Foton-M No.4 was launched from the Baikonur Cosmodrome on 18 July 2014, atop a Soyuz-2-1a carrier rocket. The launch was completed successfully, with the satellite separating from its rocket and beginning data transmission to its controllers. However, after four orbits, it ceased responding to commands issued to it from the ground. As a consequence of this, the spacecraft did not perform an orbit-raising maneuver that had been scheduled to occur shortly after orbital insertion. Satellite control was regained on 26 July by which time some of the microgravity experiments had already begun. On 1 August the head of Roskosmos, Oleg Ostapenko, was quoted as saying that the satellite will fly its entire two-month mission as originally planned, despite the cancellation of the orbit-boosting maneuver. However, all of the experiments completed by 27 August, and the Russian space agency decided to return the spacecraft to Earth on 1 September, two weeks earlier than the original 15 September target landing date.

Aboard the spacecraft were specimens for research on the biological effects of zero gravity and cosmic radiation. The specimens included geckos, silkworm eggs, dried seeds, fruit flies, and mushrooms. The geckos were part of biology experiments by Russia's Institute of Medico-Biological Problems on the effects of weightlessness on mating. Initial reports after the payload's return indicate that all five of the geckos launched in the experiment had died. Investigation is underway to determine the cause of death. However, the fruit flies did survive the trip and were able to breed and develop successfully.

Another experiment aboard the spacecraft is designed to measure the effects of microgravity on semiconductor crystal growth, with the ultimate goal of producing higher-quality crystals for use in electronics.
