= STRV =

STRV may refer to:

- Space Technology Research Vehicle, a series of British Earth-orbiting microsatellites
- STRV (company), a software company co-founded by Lubo Smid
- Stratford virus, a virus in the Flavivirus genus
- Société de transports routiers de voyageurs, a French rail company, precursor of Keolis

== See also ==
- Includes Swedish "Stridsvagn" tanks
