= Tardigrade specific proteins =

Proteins which help tardigrades survive in extreme environments

Tardigrade specific proteins are types of intrinsically disordered proteins specific to tardigrades. These proteins help tardigrades survive desiccation, one of the adaptations which contribute to tardigrade's extremotolerant nature. Tardigrade specific proteins are strongly influenced by their environment, leading to adaptive malleability across a variety of extreme abiotic environments.

== History ==
The mechanisms of tardigrade desiccation protection were originally thought to result from high levels of the sugar trehalose. Trehalose is used by organisms like yeast to avoid desiccation in dry environments by working with heat shock proteins to keep desiccation-sensitive proteins in solution. However, while tardigrades can accumulate small levels of trehalose, the levels are insufficient to provide protection from extreme conditions. Other molecules which help certain organisms avoid cellular desiccation include late embryogenesis abundant proteins, which provide protection to embryonic cotton seeds. Certain proteins actually responsible for the tardigrade's hardiness, including the cytoplasmic and secreted abundant heat soluble proteins, were discovered when searching for late embryogenesis abundant proteins in tardigrades.

One strategy used by the tardigrade to survive in dry environments is anhydrobiosis. Anhydrobiosis is a process in which an organism can lose nearly all of its water and enter an ametabolic state.

== Function ==
Tardigrade specific proteins are a type of intrinsically disordered proteins, which have no predetermined shape or task. These proteins use many different conformations, called an ensemble, to move through different structures. Because of this, intrinsically disordered proteins may react strongly to the environment they inhabit. There are three families of tardigrade specific proteins, each named after where the protein is localized within a cell. These proteins are similar to late embryogenesis abundant proteins but are specific to tardigrades. The three families do not resemble each other and are expressed or enriched during desiccation. Unlike traditional proteins, intrinsically disordered proteins do not precipitate out of solution or denature during high heat. Tardigrades rely on these proteins to help them survive extreme environments, where they put their bodies in a dehydrated state called a tun. In most organisms, dehydration causes problems for cells, which need a hydrated environment for their proteins to function. However, tardigrade specific proteins assist in preventing aggregation of cell contents upon dehydration, and maintain the integrity of the cell membrane upon rehydration.

== Types ==
=== Cytoplasmic ===
Cytoplasmic abundant heat soluble (CAHS) proteins are highly expressed in response to desiccation. There are two hypotheses for their function in tardigrades. The vitrification hypothesis is the idea that, when a tardigrade becomes desiccated, the viscosity within its cells increases to the point that denaturation and membrane fusion in proteins would stop. A second hypothesis, the water replacement hypothesis, posits that CAHS proteins replace water in other desiccation-sensitive proteins, protecting the hydrogen bonds normally reliant on water. CAHS proteins are dispersed throughout the cell in normal conditions, but form a network of filaments during environmentally stressful conditions. This network transforms the cytoplasm into a gel-like matrix and prevents the cell from collapsing as water leaches out. This state is reversible and the proteins disaggregate when exposed to less stressful conditions.

When forming the filament network, CAHS proteins have long helical domains that interact in a coiled manner with each other. These interactions are possible due to the proteins' partial disorder, with two flexible tails surrounding the helical domains.

CAHS proteins have been studied to observe their interactions with trehalose, a sugar used by other species to prevent desiccation. Trehalose was found to interact at higher levels with CAHS proteins than other sugars such as sucrose. Trehalose averages only 1% in most species of tardigrades, and in no species more than 3%, indicating that tardigrades use other strategies to tolerate dehydration.

Tardigrade CAHS protein injected into mice produced no inflammatory response or hemolysis.

=== Secreted ===
Secreted abundant heat soluble (SAHS) proteins are similar to fatty acid-binding proteins, notably in their structure with an antiparallel beta-barrel and internal fatty acid binding pocket. SAHS proteins are often secreted into media and associated with special extracellular structures. Dried tardigrades have an abundance of secretory cells which are not found in hydrated individuals. The mechanism behind SAHS proteins has not yet been determined, but the presence of secretory cells only during desiccation suggests they are used to protect cells during periods of dehydration.

=== Mitochondrial ===
Mitochondrial abundant heat soluble (MAHS) proteins are localized in mitochondria and are responsible for protecting mitochondria during desiccation. Because of its role in metabolizing reactive oxygen species, the mitochondrion is an important organelle to protect in extreme environments. During dehydration, the mitochondria of tardigrades grow much smaller and lose their cristae. MAHS proteins may act to replace water in the membrane of the mitochondria, preventing uneven rehydration and membrane rupture. Mitochondria and muscle contraction due to mitochondria are essential for tardigrade to enter the "tun" state of anhydrobiosis.

=== Dsup (damage suppressor protein) ===
Dsup is a DNA-associating protein, unique to the tardigrade, that suppresses the occurrence of DNA breaks by radiation. Dsup localized to nuclear DNA reduces single-strand breaks and double-strand breaks when subjected to ionizing radiation.

=== LEA Proteins ===
Late embryogenesis abundant proteins (LEA proteins) are proteins that protect against protein aggregation due to dehydration or osmotic stress. However, no LEA proteins have been found in tardigrades.
