= Nadezhda (cockroach) =

Cockroach sent into space by Russia in 2007

- Other name: Hope
- Born: Надежда
- Nationality: Russian
- Notable role: Sent into space during the Foton-M 3 bio-satellite flight
- Years active: 2007
- Offspring: 33

Nadezhda (Russian: Надежда, Hope) was a cockroach that was sent into space during the Foton-M 3 bio-satellite flight between September 14 and 26, 2007 by Russian scientists. Scientists monitoring the mission from Voronezh announced that Nadezhda had successfully produced 33 offspring on Earth. While it was reported that Nadezhda's offspring were the first earthlings to be conceived in microgravity, Japanese rice fish successfully conceived and produced offspring in microgravity as part of the IML-2 experiment aboard STS-65 in 1994. Nadezhda and the rest of the insects were traveling inside a sealed special container, and a video-camera was filming the whole process.

What was considered unnatural for the newborn cockroaches was that their carapace had darkened in colour much earlier, in comparison with natural-condition cockroaches who develop that darker tone later in their life cycle. But the rest of the conditions and capacities of the cockroaches remained normal. Later it was reported that Nadezhda's grandchildren, born to one of the space-born insects, had given birth on Earth to normal cockroaches, with a life cycle and development similar to that of any other cockroach.

== See also ==
- Animals in space
