= Soyuz TM-18 =

1994 Russian crewed spaceflight to Mir

- Mission type: Mir crew transport
- Operator: Rosaviakosmos
- COSPAR ID: 1994-001A
- SATCAT no.: 22957
- Mission duration: 182 days, 27 minutes, 1 second
- Orbits completed: ~2,910

Spacecraft properties
- Spacecraft: Soyuz 7K-STM No. 67
- Spacecraft type: Soyuz-TM
- Manufacturer: NPO Energia
- Launch mass: 7,150 kilograms (15,760 lb)

Crew
- Crew size: 3 up 2 down
- Members: Viktor Afanasyev; Yury Usachov
- Launching: Valeri Polyakov
- Callsign: Дербе́нт (Derbent)

Start of mission
- Launch date: January 8, 1994, 10:05:34 UTC
- Rocket: Soyuz-U2
- Launch site: Baikonur 1/5

End of mission
- Landing date: July 9, 1994, 10:32:35 UTC
- Landing site: 110 kilometres (68 mi) north of Arkalyk

Orbital parameters
- Reference system: Geocentric
- Regime: Low Earth
- Perigee altitude: 384 kilometres (239 mi)
- Apogee altitude: 390 kilometres (240 mi)
- Inclination: 51.6 degrees
- Period: 92.29 minutes
- Epoch: 7 February 1994390 kilometres (240 mi)

Docking with Mir
- Docking port: Kvant-1 aft
- Docking date: 10 January 1994, 11:50:20 UTC
- Undocking date: 9 July 1994, 07:12:59 UTC
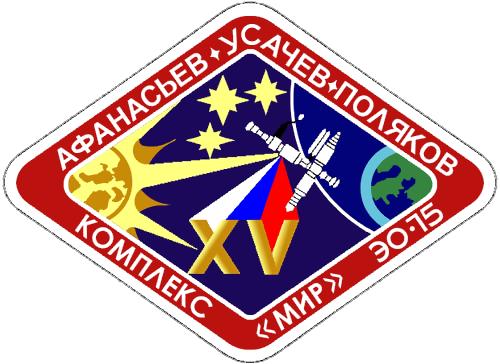
- Soyuz programme (Crewed missions)

Soyuz TM-18 was launched from Baikonur Cosmodrome and landed 112 km north of Arkalyk. TM-18 was a two-day solo flight that docked with the Mir space station on January 10, 1994. The three cosmonauts became the 15th resident crew on board Mir. The crew did research work in space flight medicine, primarily by cosmonaut Valeri Polyakov during his long-term flight, and accomplished 25 different experiments.

== Crew ==
| Position | Launching crew | Landing crew |
|---|---|---|
| Commander | Viktor Afanasyev; Second spaceflight | |
| Flight engineer | Yury Usachov; First spaceflight | |
| Research cosmonaut | Valeri Polyakov; Second and last spaceflight | None |

== Mission highlights ==
18th expedition to Mir.

Afanasyev and Usachev spent 179 days on Mir. Dr. Polyakov was slated to return to Earth on Soyuz-TM 20 in March 1995, after more than 420 days on Mir.

== See also ==
- Timeline of longest spaceflights
