= Gals (satellite) =

Russian communications satellite

Gals is a series of Russian communication satellites. The first launch was on 20 January 1994, for Chinese TV broadcast.
