= Progress M-21 =

Russian unmanned cargo spacecraft

- A Progress-M spacecraft
- Mission type: Mir resupply
- COSPAR ID: 1994-005A
- SATCAT no.: 22975

Spacecraft properties
- Spacecraft: Progress (No.221)
- Spacecraft type: Progress-M
- Manufacturer: RKK Energia

Start of mission
- Launch date: 28 January 1994, 02:12:10 UTC
- Rocket: Soyuz-U
- Launch site: Baikonur, Site 1/5

End of mission
- Disposal: Deorbited
- Decay date: 23 March 1994, 05:13 UTC

Orbital parameters
- Reference system: Geocentric
- Regime: Low Earth
- Perigee altitude: 194 km
- Apogee altitude: 236 km
- Inclination: 51.6°
- Period: 88.5 minutes
- Epoch: 28 January 1994

Docking with Mir
- Docking port: Kvant-1 aft
- Docking date: 30 January 1994, 03:56:13 UTC
- Undocking date: 23 March 1994, 01:20:29 UTC

Progress M-21 (Russian: Прогресс M-21) was a Russian unmanned Progress cargo spacecraft, which was launched in January 1994 to resupply the Mir space station.

== Launch ==
Progress M-21 launched on 28 January 1994 from the Baikonur Cosmodrome in Kazakhstan. It used a Soyuz-U rocket.

== Docking ==
Progress M-21 docked with the aft port of the Kvant-1 module of Mir on 30 January 1994 at 03:56:13 UTC, and was undocked on 23 March 1994 at 01:20:29 UTC.

== Decay ==
It remained in orbit until 23 March 1994, when it was deorbited. The deorbit burn occurred at 04:23 UTC, and the mission ended at 05:13 UTC.

== See also ==
- 1994 in spaceflight
- List of Progress missions
- List of uncrewed spaceflights to Mir
