= Progress M-23 =

Russian cargo spacecraft

- A Progress-M spacecraft
- Mission type: Mir resupply
- COSPAR ID: 1994-031A
- SATCAT no.: 23114

Spacecraft properties
- Spacecraft: Progress (No.223)
- Spacecraft type: Progress-M
- Manufacturer: RKK Energia

Start of mission
- Launch date: 22 May 1994, 04:30:04 UTC
- Rocket: Soyuz-U2
- Launch site: Baikonur, Site 1/5

End of mission
- Disposal: Deorbited
- Decay date: 2 July 1994, 14:57 UTC

Orbital parameters
- Reference system: Geocentric
- Regime: Low Earth
- Perigee altitude: 185 km
- Apogee altitude: 229 km
- Inclination: 51.6°
- Period: 88.63 minutes
- Epoch: 22 May 1994

Docking with Mir
- Docking port: Kvant-1 aft
- Docking date: 24 May 1994, 06:18:35 UTC
- Undocking date: 2 July 1994, 08:46:49 UTC

Progress M-23 (Russian: Прогресс M-23) was a Russian unmanned Progress cargo spacecraft, which was launched in May 1994 to resupply the Mir space station.

== Launch ==
Progress M-23 launched on 22 May 1994 from the Baikonur Cosmodrome in Kazakhstan. It used a Soyuz-U2 rocket.

== Docking ==
Progress M-23 docked with the aft port of the Kvant-1 module of Mir on 24 May 1994 at 06:18:35 UTC, and was undocked on 2 July 1994 at 08:46:49 UTC.

== Decay ==
It remained in orbit until 2 July 1994, when it was deorbited. The deorbit burn occurred at 14:44 UTC, with reentry occurring at 14:57 UTC. The mission ended at 15:09 UTC, when the VBK-Raduga 10 capsule landed.

== See also ==
- 1994 in spaceflight
- List of Progress missions
- List of uncrewed spaceflights to Mir
