= BIOPAN =

European Space Agency research program

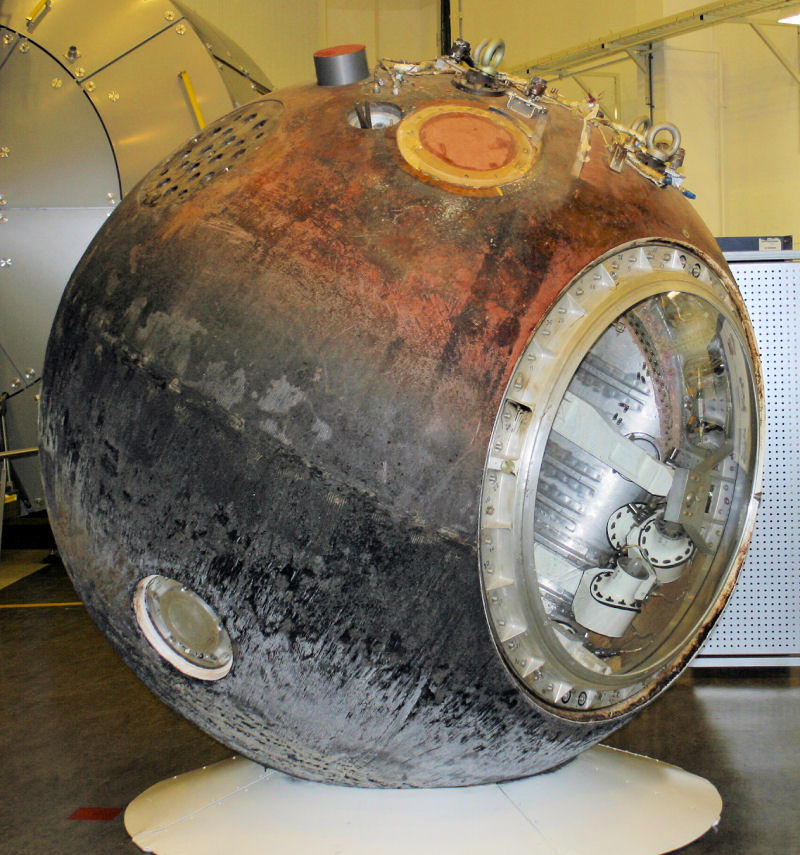
Foton-12 capsule on display

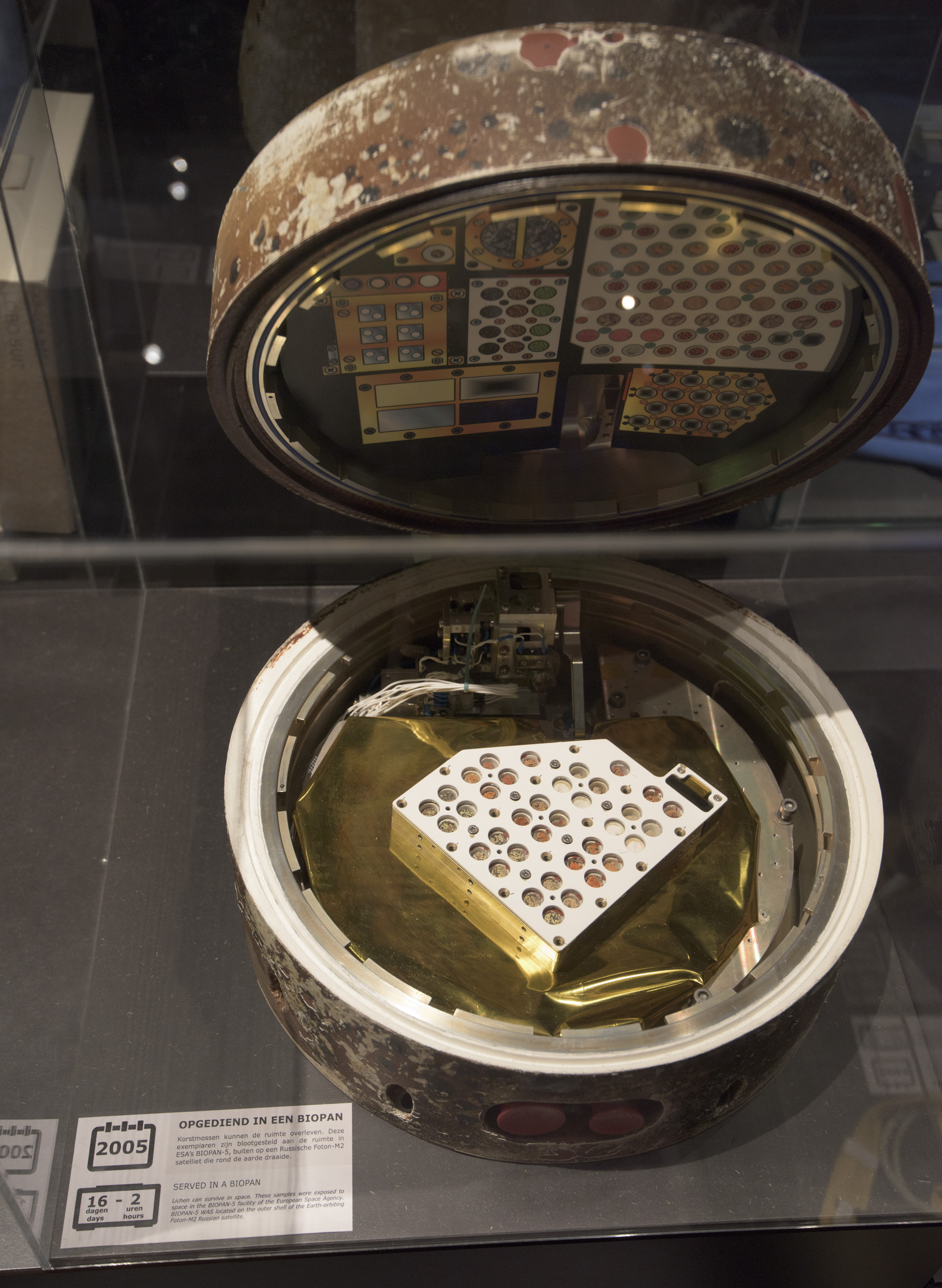
Experiment BIOPAN-5 part of the Foton-M2 mission

BIOPAN is a multi-user research program by the European Space Agency (ESA) designed to investigate the effect of the space environment on biological material. The experiments in BIOPAN are exposed to solar and cosmic radiation, the space vacuum and weightlessness, or a selection thereof. Optionally, the experiment temperature can be stabilized. BIOPAN hosts astrobiology, radiobiology and materials science experiments.

The BIOPAN facility is installed on the external surface of Russian Foton descent capsules protruding from the thermal blanket that envelops the satellite.

== Design and features ==
The BIOPAN program started in the early nineties with an ESA contract for the a joint development by Kayser-Threde and Kayser Italia. It was based on the heritage of a low-tech Russian exposure container called KNA (Kontejner Nauchnoj Apparatury). The BIOPAN facilities are installed on the external surface of Foton descent capsules. It has a motor-driven hinged lid, which opens 180° in Earth orbit to expose the experiment samples to the harsh space environment. For re-entry, the closed facility is protected with an Ablative heat shield.

The BIOPAN facilities are equipped with thermometers, UV sensors, a radiometer, a pressure sensor and an active radiation dosimeter. Data acquired by the sensors is stored by BIOPAN throughout each mission and can be accessed after flight. The possibility of overheating during atmospheric re-entry was acknowledged early during the development, therefore, a quite massive heat shield was designed for it. While the total weight of BIOPAN is close to 27 kg, including the experiments, the heat shield is responsible for 12 kg of that figure.

The BIOPAN electronics consists of the following units: signal acquisition board, microcontroller board with its flight software, memory board and EGSE.

== Missions ==
The missions flown so far are:

Mission	Spacecraft	Launch date	Duration (days)	Experiments
BIOPAN-0	Foton-8	1992-10-08	15.6 d	Test flight with non-ESA sponsored experiments
BIOPAN-1	Foton-9	1994-06-14	17.6 d	6 experiments: Base, Shrimp. Mapping, Survival, Vitamin, Dust
BIOPAN-2	Foton-11	1997-10-09	13.6 d	6 experiments: Base, Shrimp. Mapping, Survival, Vitamin, Dust
BIOPAN-3	Foton-12	1999-09-09	14.6 d	4 experiments: Survival, Yeast, Dosimap, Vitamin
BIOPAN-4	Foton-M1	Launch failure 2002-10-15	15.6 d	9 experiments - lost during launch failure
BIOPAN-5	Foton-M2	2005-05-31	16 d	9 experiments: Marstox, Levtar, Photo-I, Rado, Lichens, Organics, Yeast II, R3D-B, Permafrost
BIOPAN-6	Foton-M3	2007-09-14	13 d	10 experiments: R3D-B2, UVolution, Highrad, Yeast III, Life, LMC, Tardis A & B, Lithopanspermia, Marstox II, Rado II

== See also ==
- Bion
- Biosatellite program
- EXPOSE
- List of microorganisms tested in outer space
- O/OREOS
- OREOcube
- Tanpopo
