= Foton (satellite) =

Russian spacecraft programs

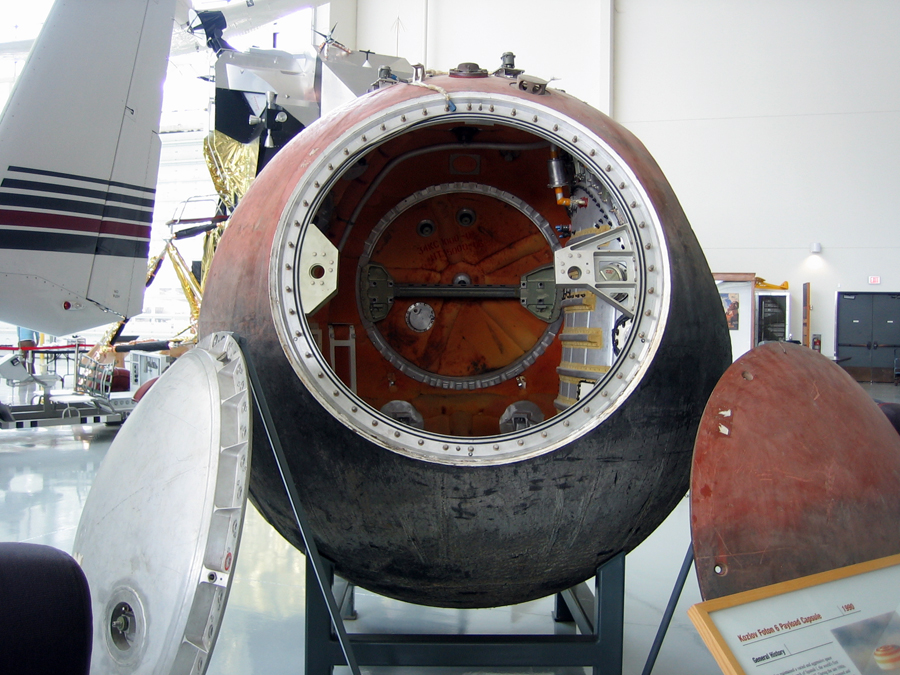
Foton 6's re-entry capsule on display at the Evergreen Aviation Museum in McMinnville, Oregon

Foton (or Photon) is the project name of two series of Russian science satellite and reentry vehicle programs. Although uncrewed, the design was adapted from the crewed Vostok spacecraft capsule. The primary focus of the Foton project is materials science research, but some missions have also carried experiments for other fields of research including biology. The original Foton series included 12 launches from the Plesetsk Cosmodrome from 1985 to 1999.

The second series, under the name Foton-M, incorporates many design improvements over the original Foton, and is still in use. So far, there have been four launch attempts of the Foton-M. The first was in 2002 from the Plesetsk Cosmodrome, which ended in failure due to a problem in the launch vehicle. The last three were from the Baikonur Cosmodrome, in 2005, 2007, and 2014; all were successful. Both the Foton and Foton-M series used Soyuz-U (11A511U and 11A511U2) rockets as launch vehicles. Starting with the Foton-7 mission, the European Space Agency has been a partner in the Foton program.

== Foton-M ==
Foton-M is a new generation of Russian robotic spacecraft for research conducted in the microgravity environment of Earth orbit. The Foton-M design is based on the design of the Foton, with several improvements including a new telemetry and telecommand unit for increased data flow rate, increased battery capacity, and a better thermal control system. It is produced by TsSKB-Progress in Samara.

The launch of Foton-M1 failed because of a malfunction of the Soyuz-U launcher. The second launch (of Foton-M2) was a success. Foton-M3 was launched on 14 September 2007, carried by a Soyuz-U rocket lifting off from the Baikonur Cosmodrome in Kazakhstan with Nadezhda, a cockroach that conceived in space and produced 33 offspring after the spacecraft returned successfully to Earth on 26 September 2007, landing in Kazakhstan at 7:58 GMT.

== Reentry ==
The Foton capsule has limited thruster capability. As such, the reentry path and orientation can not be controlled after the capsule has separated from the engine system. This means that the capsule has to be protected from reentry heat on all sides, thus explaining the spherical design (as opposed to Project Mercury's conical design), which allows for maximum volume while minimizing the external surface. However, the lack of lift means the capsule experiences high forces on reentry, up to 8 to 9g.

== Foton launches ==
Designation	Launch Date	Recovery Date	Mission Payload(s)	Notes
Foton-1	1985-04-16	?		Re-entry capsule will be on display at the Deutsches Museum in Nuremberg, Germany
Foton-2	1986-05-21	?		
Foton-3	1987-04-24	?		
Foton-4	1988-04-14	?		
Foton-5	1989-04-26	?		
Foton-6	1990-04-11	?		Re-entry capsule on display at the Evergreen Aviation Museum in McMinnville, Oregon, USA
Foton-7	1991-10-04	?		
Foton-8	1992-10-08	?		
Foton-9	1994-06-14	?		
Foton-10	1995-02-16	?		
Foton-11	1997-10-09	?		
Foton-12	1999-09-09	1999-09-24		Re-entry capsule on display at the European Space Research and Technology Centre in Noordwijk, Netherlands
Foton-M No.1	2002-10-15	N/A		Lost due to a launch failure
Foton-M No.2	2005-05-31	2005-06-16		
Foton-M No.3	2007-09-14	2007-09-26	Young Engineers' Satellite 2	Carried Nadezhda, a cockroach that mated during the mission and later produced 33 offspring after landing. It also carried tardigrades into space.
Foton-M No.4	2014-07-18	2014-09-01		Planned two-month mission was reduced to 44 days due to communications failure after launch and a missed rocket burn to the planned 575-kilometer (357-mile) orbit. Five geckos, launched to track their sexual habits in space, died during the mission.

== See also ==
- Biosatellite
- Bion
- BIOPAN
- Animals in space
