= Foton-M No.1 =

Unmanned spacecraft

Foton-M No.1 was an uncrewed space mission by the European Space Agency aboard a Russian Soyuz-U rocket that failed to launch successfully. The spacecraft's payload consisted of 44 experiments prepared by the European Space Agency, Fluidpac, BIOPAN-4, Telescience Support Unit, and others. The mission was supposed to consist of 15 days spent in orbit of the Earth and then re-enter for a landing near the Russia-Kazakhstan border.

The launch occurred at the Plesetsk Cosmodrome on 15 October 2002 at 18:20 UTC. The Blok D strap-on produced an abnormal start transient, but for unknown reasons, ground controllers did not send a shutdown command and abort the flight. Eight seconds after liftoff, the Blok D's propulsion system shut down. The booster climbed to an altitude of about 200m before the strap-on broke away from the stack. At this point, the onboard computer sent an automatic shutdown command to the core and remaining strap-ons. The Blok D strap-on fell back onto LC-43 while the rest of the launch vehicle impacted the ground some distance away. A 20-year-old army lieutenant, Ivan Marchenko, was killed and considerable damage resulted to launch facilities.

An investigation found that the most likely cause of the failure was debris being ingested into the Blok D hydrogen peroxide pump, cutting off the supply of lubricant to the turbopumps. This was the first failure of an R-7 launch vehicle in the first two minutes of launch since 1988. The next time an R-7 vehicle would fail before reaching space would be the 2018 Soyuz MS-10 in-flight abort.
