= Dsup =

Tardigrade protein against DNA damage

Damage suppressor protein

Identifiers
- Organism: Ramazzottius varieornatus (tardigrade)
- Symbol: Dsup
- UniProt: P0DOW4
Search for
- Structures: Swiss-model
- Domains: InterPro

Dsup (contraction of damage suppressor) is a DNA-associating protein, unique to the tardigrade, that suppresses the occurrence of DNA breaks by radiation. When human HEK293 cells were engineered with Dsup proteins, they showed approximately 40% more tolerance against X-ray radiation.

Tardigrades can withstand 1,000 times more radiation than other animals, median lethal doses of 5,000 Gy (of gamma rays) and 6,200 Gy (of heavy ions) in hydrated animals (5 to 10 Gy could be fatal to a human). The only explanation found in earlier experiments for this ability was that their lowered water state provides fewer reactants for ionizing radiation. However, subsequent research found that tardigrades, when hydrated, still remain highly resistant to shortwave UV radiation in comparison to other animals, and that one factor for this is their ability to efficiently repair damage to their DNA resulting from that exposure. A landmark study on Dsup protein showed that it can bind nucleosomes in the cell and protect DNA.

The Dsup protein has been tested on other animal cells. Using a culture of human cells that express the Dsup protein, it was found that after X-ray exposure the cells had fewer DNA breaks than control cells.

After hydrogen peroxide treatment Dsup+ cells mainly activate the detoxification systems and the antioxidant enzymes that limit oxidative stress and eliminate oxidative free radicals, while DNA repair mechanisms are only marginally activated. Thus, upon induction of oxidative stress Dsup protein appears to mainly protect DNA directly.

Dsup protein has been found to be neurotoxic and promote neurodegeneration when expressed in cultured neurons by increasing DNA damage through the formation of double strand breaks.

== Function and structure ==
The Dsup from Ramazzottius varieornatus is mainly used for study, since it is one of the most stress-tolerant species. Orthologous versions of Dsup are also found in Hypsibius exemplaris (OQV24709, A0A1W0XB17). Dsup does not exhibit a lot of secondary structure, save for the helix in the middle. The C-terminal half contains an NLS, and this Ala/Gly-rich half is sufficient for DNA binding. It is probably mostly disordered, but it has a lot of positive charge.

Dsup is known to bind to free DNA, but it binds more tightly to nucleosomes, the typical packed form of DNA in eukaryotic cells. Its nucleosome binding domain is vaguely similar to the one in HMGN proteins. Dsup localized to nuclear DNA reduces single-strand breaks and double-strand breaks when subjected to ionizing radiation.

Molecular dynamic simulation of Dsup in complex with DNA shows that it is an intrinsically disordered protein. Its flexibility and electrostatic charge helps it bind to DNA and form aggregates.
