= 1995 in spaceflight =

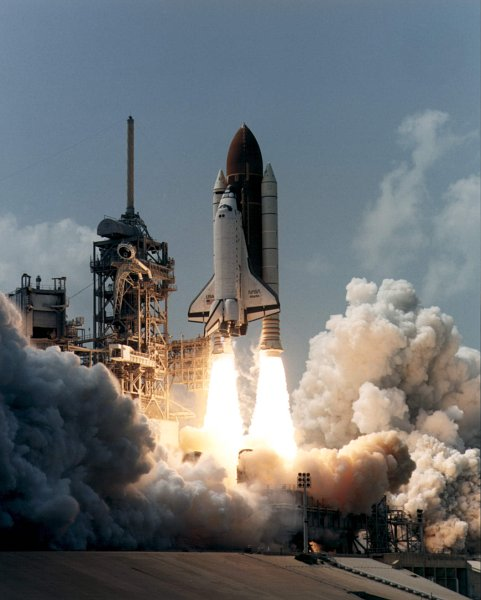
- Space Shuttle Atlantis launches on STS-71, the first Shuttle-Mir mission to dock with Mir

Orbital launches
- First: 11 January
- Last: 24 December
- Total: 80
- Successes: 72
- Failures: 5
- Partial failures: 3
- Catalogued: 74

National firsts
- Satellite: Czech Republic (post Czechoslovak); Ukraine (post Soviet)

Rockets
- Maiden flights: Athena I Conestoga; Delta II 7920; Long March 1D; Volna; Shavit 1 Pegasus-Hybrid
- Retirements: Atlas E/F; Conestoga; Long March 2E; Mu-3SII; Soyuz-U2

Crewed flights
- Orbital: 9
- Total travellers: 48

1995 in spaceflight

This article outlines notable events occurring in 1995 in spaceflight, including major launches and EVAs.

== First Shuttle-Mir mission ==
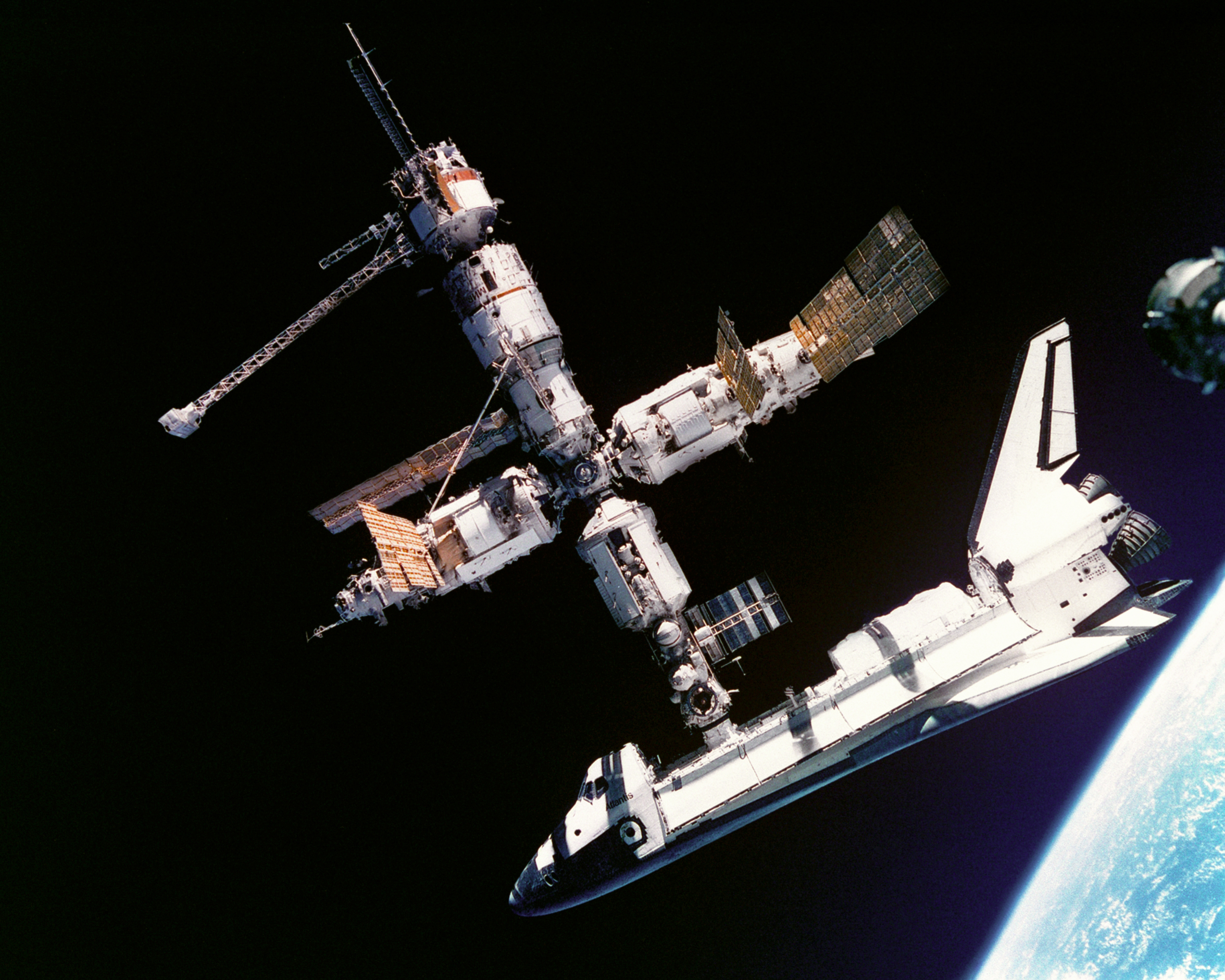
Atlantis docked to Mir, photographed from a departing Soyuz-TM spacecraft

STS-71 was a crewed spaceflight that was the third mission of the US/Russian Shuttle-Mir Program. The mission began on June 27, 1995, with the launch of Space Shuttle Atlantis from launchpad 39A at the Kennedy Space Center in Florida. Atlantis became the first Space Shuttle to dock with the Russian space station Mir, delivering a relief crew of two cosmonauts Anatoly Solovyev and Nikolai Budarin to the station and recovering Increment astronaut Norman Thagard. Atlantis returned to Earth on July 7 with a crew of eight. It was the first of seven straight missions to Mir flown by Atlantis, and the second Shuttle mission to land with an eight-person crew after STS-61-A in 1985.

== Orbital launches ==
- ← Jan
- Feb
- Mar
- Apr
- May
- Jun
- Jul
- Aug
- Sep
- Oct
- Nov
- Dec →

Date and time (UTC)	Rocket	Flight number	Launch site		LSP	
Date and time (UTC)	Payload (⚀ = CubeSat)	Operator	Orbit	Function	Decay (UTC)	Outcome
Date and time (UTC)	Remarks					
=== January ===
10 January; 06:18	(United States) Atlas IIAS		(United States) Cape Canaveral LC-36B		(United States) (Russia) International Launch Services	
10 January; 06:18	(United Nations) Intelsat 704	Intelsat	Geosynchronous	Communications	In orbit	Operational
15 January; 13:45	(Japan) Mu-3SII		(Japan) Uchinoura		(Japan) ISAS	
15 January; 13:45	(Japan) Express 1	ISAS	Low Earth	Material research	15 January	Failure
15 January; 13:45	Final flight of Mu-3SII; Second stage control malfunction, decayed from orbit shortly after launch over Ghana; Spacecraft intended to be recovered					
24 January; 03:54	(Russia) Kosmos-3M		(Russia) Plesetsk Site 132/1		(Russia)	
24 January; 03:54	(Russia) Tsikada	MO RF	Low Earth (Polar)	Navigation	In orbit	Operational
24 January; 03:54	(Sweden) Astrid	SSC	Low Earth (Polar)	Auroral research	27 September	Successful
24 January; 03:54	(United States) FAISAT	FAI	Low Earth (Polar)	Communications	In orbit	Operational
25 January; 22:40	(China) Long March 2E		(China) Xichang LC-2		(China) CASC	
25 January; 22:40	(China) Apstar 2	APT	Intended: Geosynchronous	Communications	25 January	Launch Failure
25 January; 22:40	Windshear caused the collapse of the payload fairing and a guidance error caused the launch vehicle to explode; 20-120 ground casualties					
29 January; 06:18	(United States) Atlas II		(United States) Cape Canaveral LC-36A		(United States)	
29 January; 06:18	(United States) USA-108 (UHF F/O F4)	US Navy	Geosynchronous	Communications	In orbit	Operational
=== February ===
3 February; 05:22	(United States) Space Shuttle Discovery		(United States) Kennedy LC-39B		(United States) United Space Alliance	
3 February; 05:22	(United States) STS-63	NASA	Low Earth (Mir)	Shuttle-Mir flight	11 February; 11:51	Successful
3 February; 05:22	(United States) SpaceHab LSM	NASA/SpaceHab	Low Earth (Discovery)	Scientific research	11 February; 11:51	Successful
3 February; 05:22	(United States) SPARTAN 204	NRL	Low Earth	Ultraviolet astronomy	11 February; 11:51	Successful
3 February; 05:22	(United States) ODERACS 2A	NASA	Low Earth	Laser calibration	9 March 1996	Successful
3 February; 05:22	(United States) ODERACS 2B	NASA	Low Earth	Laser calibration	28 August	Successful
3 February; 05:22	(United States) ODERACS 2C	NASA	Low Earth	Laser calibration	7 February 1996	Successful
3 February; 05:22	(United States) ODERACS 2D	NASA	Low Earth	Laser calibration	2 March	Successful
3 February; 05:22	(United States) ODERACS 2E	NASA	Low Earth	Laser calibration	27 February	Successful
3 February; 05:22	(United States) ODERACS 2F	NASA	Low Earth	Laser calibration	20 February	Successful
3 February; 05:22	Crewed orbital flight with six astronauts; First Shuttle-Mir flight (rendezvous only, no docking); ODERACS deployed on 4 February					
15 February; 16:48	(Russia) Soyuz-U		(Kazakhstan) Baikonur Site 1/5		(Russia) Roskosmos	
15 February; 16:48	(Russia) Progress M-26	Roskosmos	Low Earth (Mir)	Logistics	15 March; 06:15	Successful
16 February; 17:39	(Russia) Soyuz-U		(Russia) Plesetsk Site 43/4		(Russia) Roskosmos	
16 February; 17:39	(Russia) Foton 10	Roskosmos	Low Earth	Microgravity research	3 March	Successful
=== March ===
2 March; 06:38	(United States) Space Shuttle Endeavour		(United States) Kennedy LC-39A		(United States) United Space Alliance	
2 March; 06:38	(United States) STS-67	NASA	Low Earth	Astronomy	18 March; 21:48	Successful
2 March; 06:38	(United States) Spacelab Pallets and Igloo	NASA	Low Earth (Endeavour)	ASTRO-2	18 March; 21:48	Successful
2 March; 06:38	(United States) EDO Pallet	NASA	Low Earth (Endeavour)	Cryogenic mission extension pallet	18 March; 21:48	Successful
2 March; 06:38	Crewed orbital flight with seven astronauts					
2 March; 13:00	(Russia) Kosmos-3M		(Russia) Plesetsk Site 132/1		(Russia)	
2 March; 13:00	(Russia) Kosmos 2306 (Taifun-2 #27)	MO RF	Low Earth	Laser calibration	30 October 2000	Successful
7 March; 09:23	(Russia) Proton-K/DM-2		(Kazakhstan) Baikonur Site 200/39		(Russia)	
7 March; 09:23	(Russia) Kosmos 2307 (GLONASS)	MOM	Medium Earth	Navigation	In orbit	Successful
7 March; 09:23	(Russia) Kosmos 2308 (GLONASS)	MOM	Medium Earth	Navigation	In orbit	Successful
7 March; 09:23	(Russia) Kosmos 2309 (GLONASS)	MOM	Medium Earth	Navigation	In orbit	Successful
14 March; 06:11	(Russia) Soyuz-U2		(Kazakhstan) Baikonur Site 1/5		(Russia) Roskosmos	
14 March; 06:11	(Russia) Soyuz TM-21	Roskosmos	Low Earth (Mir)	Mir EO-18	11 September; 06:52	Successful
14 March; 06:11	Crewed orbital flight with three cosmonauts including the first American to fly on a Russian rocket					
18 March; 08:01	(Japan) H-II		(Japan) Tanegashima LA-Y1		(Japan) NASDA	
18 March; 08:01	(Japan) Space Flyer Unit	NASDA	Low Earth	Materials research	20 January 1996; 07:42	Successful
18 March; 08:01	(Japan) Himawari 5	NASDA	Low Earth	Weather satellite	In orbit	Operational
18 March; 08:01	Space Flyer Unit retrieved by Space Shuttle Endeavour during STS-72 in January 1996					
22 March; 04:09	(Russia) Kosmos-3M		(Russia) Plesetsk Site 132/1		(Russia)	
22 March; 04:09	(Russia) Kosmos 2310 (Parus)	MO RF	Low Earth	Navigation	In orbit	Operational
22 March; 06:18	(United States) Atlas IIAS		(United States) Cape Canaveral LC-36B		(United States) (Russia) International Launch Services	
22 March; 06:18	(United Nations) Intelsat 705	Intelsat	Geosynchronous	Communications	In orbit	Operational
22 March; 16:44	(Russia) Soyuz-U		(Russia) Plesetsk Site 43/3		(Russia)	
22 March; 16:44	(Russia) Kosmos 2311 (Yantar)	MOM	Low Earth	Reconnaissance	31 May	Successful
24 March; 14:05	(United States) Atlas E		(United States) Vandenberg SLC-3W		(United States)	
24 March; 14:05	(United States) USA-109 (DMSP 5D2 F13)	US Air Force/NOAA	Sun-synchronous	Meteorology	3 February 2015	Successful
24 March; 14:05	Final flight of Atlas E and 1.5 stage-to-orbit configuration of Atlas rocket Satellite exploded on 3 February 2015, leaving at least 47 tracked pieces of debris.					
28 March; 10:00	(Russia) Start		(Russia) Plesetsk Site 158		(Russia) RVSN	
28 March; 10:00	(Israel) Gurwin 1	Technion	Intended: Low Earth	Amateur radio	28 March	Launch Failure
28 March; 10:00	(Russia) EKA-2		Intended: Low Earth	Boilerplate for vehicle evaluation	28 March	Launch Failure
28 March; 10:00	(Mexico) Oscar 29	UNAM/AMSAT	Intended: Low Earth	Amateur radio	28 March	Launch Failure
28 March; 10:00	Failed to orbit, crashed into the Sea of Okhotsk					
28 March; 23:14	(France) Ariane 4 (44LP)		(France) Kourou ELA-2		(France) Arianespace	
28 March; 23:14	(Brazil) Brasilsat B2	Telebrás	Geosynchronous	Communications	In orbit	Successful
28 March; 23:14	(France) Hot Bird 1	Eutelsat	Geosynchronous	Communications	In orbit	Successful
=== April ===
3 April; 13:48	(United States) Pegasus-H		(United States) Stargazer, Vandenberg		(United States) Orbital Sciences	
3 April; 13:48	(United States) Orbcomm F1	Orbcomm	Low Earth	Communications	In orbit	Successful
3 April; 13:48	(United States) Orbcomm F2	Orbcomm	Low Earth	Communications	In orbit	Successful
3 April; 13:48	(United States) Orbview 1	Orbimage	Low Earth	Earth observation	In orbit	Successful
5 April; 11:16	(Israel) Shavit-1		(Israel) Palmachim		(Israel) IAI	
5 April; 11:16	(Israel) Ofeq-3	IAI	Low Earth (retrograde)	Reconnaissance	24 October 2000	Successful
7 April; 21:47	(United States) Atlas IIAS		(United States) Cape Canaveral LC-36A		(United States) (Russia) International Launch Services	
7 April; 21:47	(United States) AMSC-1	AMSC	Geosynchronous	Communications	In orbit	Operational
9 April; 19:34	(Russia) Soyuz-U		(Kazakhstan) Baikonur Site 1/5		(Russia) Roskosmos	
9 April; 19:34	(Russia) Progress M-27	Roskosmos	Low Earth (Mir)	Logistics	23 May; 03:27	Successful
9 April; 19:34	(Germany) GFZ		Low Earth	Laser calibration	23 June 1999	Successful
9 April; 19:34	GFZ deployed from Mir on 19 April					
21 April; 01:44	(France) Ariane 4 (40)		(France) Kourou ELA-2		(France) Arianespace	
21 April; 01:44	ERS-2	ESA	Sun-synchronous	Remote sensing	21 February 2024; 17:17	Successful
=== May ===
14 May; 13:45	(United States) Titan IVA (401)/Centaur		(United States) Cape Canaveral LC-40		(United States) Lockheed Martin	
14 May; 13:45	(United States) USA-110 (Mentor-1)	NRO	Geosynchronous	SIGINT	In orbit	Operational
17 May; 06:34	(France) Ariane 4 (44LP)		(France) Kourou ELA-2		(France) Arianespace	
17 May; 06:34	(United Nations) Intelsat 706	Intelsat	Geosynchronous	Communications	In orbit	Successful
20 May; 03:33	(Russia) Proton-K		(Kazakhstan) Baikonur Site 81/23		(Russia) Roskosmos	
20 May; 03:33	(Russia) Spektr	Roskosmos/NASA	Low Earth (Mir)	Mir module	23 March 2001; 05:50	Successful
20 May; 03:33	Heavily damaged in collision with Progress M-34 on 25 June 1997					
23 May; 05:52	(United States) Atlas I		(United States) Cape Canaveral LC-36B		(United States) (Russia) International Launch Services	
23 May; 05:52	(United States) GOES-9 (GOES-J)	NOAA	Current: Graveyard; Operational: Geosynchronous	Meteorology	In orbit	Successful
23 May; 05:52	Retired on 14 June 2007					
24 May; 20:10	(Russia) Molniya-M		(Russia) Plesetsk Site 16/2		(Russia)	
24 May; 20:10	(Russia) Kosmos 2312 (Oko)	MOM	Molniya	Early warning	In orbit	Successful
31 May; 15:27	(United States) Atlas II		(United States) Cape Canaveral LC-36A		(United States)	
31 May; 15:27	(United States) USA-111 (UHF F/O F5)	US Navy	Geosynchronous	Communications	In orbit	Operational
=== June ===
8 June; 04:43	(Ukraine) Tsyklon-2		(Kazakhstan) Baikonur Site 90/20		(Russia)	
8 June; 04:43	(Russia) Kosmos 2313 (EORSAT)	MO RF	Low Earth	SIGINT	11 July 1997	Successful
10 June; 00:24	(France) Ariane 4 (42P)		(France) Kourou ELA-2		(France) Arianespace	
10 June; 00:24	(United States) DirecTV-2	DirecTV	Geosynchronous	Communications	In orbit	Operational
22 June; 19:58	(United States) Pegasus-XL		(United States) Stargazer, Vandenberg		(United States) Orbital Sciences	
22 June; 19:58	(United States) STEP 3	US Air Force	Intended: Low Earth	Technology development	22 June	Launch Failure
22 June; 19:58	Second stage malfunction, destroyed by range safety					
27 June; 19:32	(United States) Space Shuttle Atlantis		(United States) Kennedy LC-39A		(United States) United Space Alliance	
27 June; 19:32	(United States) STS-71	NASA	Low Earth (Mir)	Shuttle-Mir flight	7 July; 14:55	Successful
27 June; 19:32	(United States) Spacelab Long Module 2	NASA	Low Earth (Atlantis)	Medical research	7 July; 14:55	Successful
27 June; 19:32	Crewed orbital flight launching with seven and landing with eight astronauts First Shuttle-Mir docking, exchanged Mir EO-18 for EO-19 (first space station crew exchange using a Space Shuttle)					
28 June; 18:25	(Russia) Soyuz-U		(Russia) Plesetsk Site 43/3		(Russia)	
28 June; 18:25	(Russia) Kosmos 2314 (Yantar-4K1)	MOM	Low Earth	Reconnaissance	6 September	Successful
=== July ===
5 July; 03:09	(Russia) Kosmos-3M		(Russia) Plesetsk Site 132/1		(Russia)	
5 July; 03:09	(Russia) Kosmos 2315 (Tsikada)	MO RF	Low Earth	Navigation	In orbit	Operational
7 July; 16:23	(France) Ariane 4 (40)		(France) Kourou ELA-2		(France) Arianespace	
7 July; 16:23	(France) Helios 1A	CNES	Sun-synchronous	Reconnaissance	In orbit	Operational
7 July; 16:23	(France) Cerise	CNES	Sun-synchronous	Radiation research	In orbit	Operational
7 July; 16:23	(Spain) LBSAT/UPM-Sat 1	UPM	Sun-synchronous	Communications	In orbit	Successful
10 July; 12:38	(United States) Titan IVA (401)/Centaur		(United States) Cape Canaveral LC-41		(United States) Lockheed Martin	
10 July; 12:38	(United States) USA-112 (Trumpet-2)	NRO	Molniya	ELINT	In orbit	Operational
13 July; 13:41	(United States) Space Shuttle Discovery		(United States) Kennedy LC-39A		(United States) United Space Alliance	
13 July; 13:41	(United States) STS-70	NASA	Low Earth	Satellite deployment	22 July; 12:02	Successful
13 July; 13:41	(United States) TDRS-7 (TDRS-G)	NASA	Geosynchronous	Communications	In orbit	Operational
13 July; 13:41	Crewed orbital flight with five astronauts TDRS deployed on 13 July using an Inertial Upper Stage					
20 July; 03:04	(Russia) Soyuz-U		(Kazakhstan) Baikonur Site 1/5		(Russia) Roskosmos	
20 July; 03:04	(Russia) Progress M-28	Roskosmos	Low Earth (Mir)	Logistics	4 September; 08:58	Successful
24 July; 15:52	(Russia) Proton-K/DM-2		(Kazakhstan) Baikonur Site 200/39		(Russia)	
24 July; 15:52	(Russia) Kosmos 2316 (GLONASS)	MOM	Medium Earth	Navigation	In orbit	Operational
24 July; 15:52	(Russia) Kosmos 2317 (GLONASS)	MOM	Medium Earth	Navigation	In orbit	Operational
24 July; 15:52	(Russia) Kosmos 2318 (GLONASS)	MOM	Medium Earth	Navigation	In orbit	Successful
31 July; 23:30	(United States) Atlas IIA		(United States) Cape Canaveral LC-36A		(United States)	
31 July; 23:30	(United States) USA-113 (DSCS III B-7)	US Air Force	Geosynchronous	Communications	In orbit	Successful
=== August ===
2 August; 23:59	(Russia) Molniya-M		(Russia) Plesetsk Site 43/3		(Russia) VKS	
2 August; 23:59	(Russia) Interbol 1	Roskosmos	High Earth (elliptical)	Magnetospheric research	16 October 2000	Successful
2 August; 23:59	(Czech Republic) Magion 4		High Earth (elliptical)	Magnetospheric research	16 October 2000	Successful
2 August; 23:59	Magion 4 was the first Czech (post Czechoslovak) satellite					
3 August; 22:58	(France) Ariane 4 (42L)		(France) Kourou ELA-2		(France) Arianespace	
3 August; 22:58	(United States) PAS-4	PanAmSat	Geosynchronous	Communications	In orbit	Operational
5 August; 11:10	(United States) Delta II 7925		(United States) Cape Canaveral LC-17B		(United States) Boeing IDS	
5 August; 11:10	(South Korea) Koreasat 1	Korea Telecom	Geosynchronous	Communications	In orbit	Partial Failure
5 August; 11:10	SRM malfunction resulted in incorrect orbit which was corrected using the satellite's own engines at the expense of half of the expected lifespan of the satellite					
9 August; 23:59	(Russia) Molniya-M		(Russia) Plesetsk Site 43/3		(Russia) VKS	
9 August; 23:59	(Russia) Molniya 3-47	MOM	Molniya	Communications	In orbit	Operational
15 August; 22:30	(United States) Athena I		(United States) Vandenberg SLC-6		(United States) Lockheed Martin	
15 August; 22:30	(United States) GemStar 1 (VitaSat)	VITA	Intended: Low Earth	Communications	+160 seconds	Launch Failure
15 August; 22:30	Maiden flight of Athena I and first launch from SLC-6; Destroyed by range safety after loss of control system					
29 August; 00:53	(United States) Atlas IIAS		(United States) Cape Canaveral LC-36B		(United States) (Russia) International Launch Services	
29 August; 00:53	(Japan) JCSAT-3	JSAT	Geosynchronous	Communications	In orbit	Operational
29 August; 06:41	(France) Ariane 4 (44P)		(France) Kourou ELA-2		(France) Arianespace	
29 August; 06:41	(Japan) N-STAR a	NTT	Geosynchronous	Communications	In orbit	Operational
30 August; 19:33	(Russia) Proton-K/DM-2		(Kazakhstan) Baikonur Site 200/39		(Russia) VKS	
30 August; 19:33	(Russia) Kosmos 2319 (Potok)	MOM	Geosynchronous	Communications	In orbit	Operational
31 August; 06:49	(Ukraine) Tsyklon-3		(Russia) Plesetsk Site 32		(Russia) VKS	
31 August; 06:49	(Ukraine) Sich-1 (Okean)	NKAU	Low Earth	Remote sensing	In orbit	Operational
31 August; 06:49	(Chile) FASat-Alfa (FASat-Alfa)	FACH	Low Earth	Technology development	In orbit	Partial Failure
31 August; 06:49	Sich 1 was the first Ukrainian satellite; FASat-Alfa intended to be the first Chilean satellite and failed to separate from Sich 1					
=== September ===
3 September; 09:00	(Russia) Soyuz-U2		(Kazakhstan) Baikonur Site 1/5		(Russia) Roskosmos	
3 September; 09:00	(Russia) Soyuz TM-22	Roskosmos	Low Earth (Mir)	Mir EO-20	29 February 1996; 10:42	Successful
3 September; 09:00	Crewed orbital flight with three cosmonauts Final flight of Soyuz-U2					
7 September; 15:09	(United States) Space Shuttle Endeavour		(United States) Kennedy LC-39A		(United States) United Space Alliance	
7 September; 15:09	(United States) STS-69	NASA	Low Earth	Microgravity research	16 September; 11:38	Successful
7 September; 15:09	(United States) SPARTAN-201	NASA	Low Earth	Solar research	16 September; 11:38	Successful
7 September; 15:09	(United States) Wake Shield Facility	NASA	Low Earth	Materials research	16 September; 11:38	Successful
7 September; 15:09	IEH-1	ESA	Low Earth (Endeavour)	Ultraviolet astronomy	16 September; 11:38	Successful
7 September; 15:09	Crewed orbital flight with five astronauts SPARTAN deployed on 8 September and retrieved on 10 September; WSF deployed on 7 September and retrieved on 14 September					
24 September; 00:06	(France) Ariane 4 (42L)		(France) Kourou ELA-2		(France) Arianespace	
24 September; 00:06	(United States) Telstar 402R	AT&T	Geosynchronous	Communications	In orbit	Successful
24 September; 00:06	Power failure on 19 September 2003 resulted in loss of satellite					
26 September; 11:20	(Russia) Soyuz-U		(Russia) Plesetsk Site 43/4		(Russia) VKS	
26 September; 11:20	(Russia) Resurs F2	MOM	Low Earth	Resource location	26 October	Successful
29 September; 04:25	(Russia) Soyuz-U		(Kazakhstan) Baikonur Site 31/6		(Russia) VKS	
29 September; 04:25	(Russia) Kosmos 2320 (Yantar-4KS1)	MOM	Low Earth	Reconnaissance	28 September 1996	Successful
=== October ===
6 October; 03:23	(Russia) Kosmos-3M		(Russia) Plesetsk Site 132/1		(Russia) VKS	
6 October; 03:23	(Russia) Kosmos 2321 (Parus)	MO RF	Low Earth	Navigation	21 August 1997	Partial Failure
6 October; 03:23	Second stage malfunction, placed in useless orbit					
8 October; 18:50	(Russia) Soyuz-U		(Kazakhstan) Baikonur Site 1/5		(Russia) VKS	
8 October; 18:50	(Russia) Progress M-29	Roskosmos	Low Earth (Mir)	Logistics	19 December; 16:15	Successful
11 October; 16:26	(Russia) Proton-K/DM-2		(Kazakhstan) Baikonur Site 81/23		(Russia) VKS	
11 October; 16:26	(Russia) Luch-1Luch	MOM	Geosynchronous	Communications	In orbit	Successful
11 October; 16:26	Retired on 1 June 1999					
19 October; 00:38	(France) Ariane 4 (42L)		(France) Kourou ELA-2		(France) Arianespace	
19 October; 00:38	(Luxembourg) Astra 1E	SES Astra	Geosynchronous	Communications	In orbit	Operational
20 October; 13:53	(United States) Space Shuttle Columbia		(United States) Kennedy LC-39B		(United States) United Space Alliance	
20 October; 13:53	(United States) STS-73	NASA	Low Earth	Microgravity research	5 November; 11:46	Successful
20 October; 13:53	(United States) Spacelab Long Module 1	NASA	Low Earth (Columbia)	Spacelab USML-2	5 November; 11:46	Successful
20 October; 13:53	(United States) EDO Pallet	NASA	Low Earth (Columbia)	Cryogenic mission extension pallet	5 November; 11:46	Successful
20 October; 13:53	Crewed orbital flight with seven astronauts					
22 October; 08:00	(United States) Atlas II		(United States) Cape Canaveral LC-36A		(United States)	
22 October; 08:00	(United States) USA-114 (UHF F/O F6)	US Navy	Geosynchronous	Communications	In orbit	Operational
23 October; 22:03	(United States) Conestoga 1620		(United States) Wallops Island LP-0A		(United States)	
23 October; 22:03	METEOR		Intended: Low Earth	Microgravity research	+ 46 seconds	Launch Failure
23 October; 22:03	Self-destruct activated after loss of control					
31 October; 20:19	(Ukraine) Zenit-2		(Kazakhstan) Baikonur Site 45/1		(Russia) VKS	
31 October; 20:19	(Russia) Kosmos 2322 (Tselina-2)	MO RF	Low Earth	SIGINT	In orbit	Operational
=== November ===
4 November; 14:22	(United States) Delta II 7920-10		(United States) Vandenberg SLC-2W		(United States) Boeing IDS	
4 November; 14:22	(Canada) RADARSAT-1	CSA	Sun-synchronous	Earth imaging	In orbit	Operational
4 November; 14:22	(United States) SURFSAT	NASA	Sun-synchronous	Test DSN	In orbit	Successful
4 November; 14:22	Maiden flight of Delta II 7920 and first Delta II launch from Vandenberg Air Force Base					
6 November; 05:51	(United States) Titan IVA (401)/Centaur		(United States) Cape Canaveral LC-40		(United States) Lockheed Martin	
6 November; 05:51	(United States) USA-115 (Milstar-2)	US Air Force	Geosynchronous	Communications	In orbit	Operational
12 November; 12:30	(United States) Space Shuttle Atlantis		(United States) Kennedy LC-39A		(United States) United Space Alliance	
12 November; 12:30	(United States) STS-74	NASA	Low Earth (Mir)	Shuttle-Mir flight	20 November; 17:02	Successful
12 November; 12:30	(Russia) (United States) Mir Docking Module	Roskosmos/NASA	Low Earth (Mir)	Mir module	23 March 2001; 05:50	Successful
12 November; 12:30	Crewed orbital flight with five astronauts					
17 November; 01:20	(France) Ariane 4 (44P)		(France) Kourou ELA-2		(France) Arianespace	
17 November; 01:20	Infrared Space Observatory	ESA	High Earth (elliptical)	Infrared astronomy	In orbit	Successful
17 November; 01:20	Retired on 16 May 1998					
17 November; 14:25	(Russia) Proton-K/DM-2		(Kazakhstan) Baikonur Site 200/39		(Russia) VKS	
17 November; 14:25	(Russia) Gals-2	MOM	Geosynchronous	Communications	In orbit	Operational
28 November; 11:30	(China) Long March 2E		(China) Taiyuan LC-2		(China) CASC	
28 November; 11:30	(China) AsiaSat 2	AsiaSat	Geosynchronous	Communications	In orbit	Operational
=== December ===
2 December; 08:08	(United States) Atlas IIAS		(United States) Cape Canaveral LC-36B		(United States) (Russia) International Launch Services	
2 December; 08:08	(United States) SOHO	ESA/NASA	Earth-Sun L_{1} point	Solar research	In orbit	Operational
5 December; 21:18	(United States) Titan IVA (404)		(United States) Vandenberg SLC-4E		(United States) Lockheed Martin	
5 December; 21:18	(United States) USA-116 (KH-12)	NRO	Sun-synchronous	Reconnaissance	In orbit	Operational
6 December; 23:23	(France) Ariane 4 (44L)		(France) Kourou ELA-2		(France) Arianespace	
6 December; 23:23	(France) Telecom 2C	France Télécom	Geosynchronous	Communications	In orbit	Successful
6 December; 23:23	(India) INSAT-2C	ISRO	Geosynchronous	Communications	In orbit	Successful
14 December; 06:10	(Russia) Proton-K/DM-2		(Kazakhstan) Baikonur Site 200/39		(Russia) VKS	
14 December; 06:10	(Russia) Kosmos 2323 (GLONASS)	MOM	Medium Earth	Navigation	In orbit	Operational
14 December; 06:10	(Russia) Kosmos 2324 (GLONASS)	MOM	Medium Earth	Navigation	In orbit	Operational
14 December; 06:10	(Russia) Kosmos 2325 (GLONASS)	MOM	Medium Earth	Navigation	In orbit	Operational
15 December; 00:23	(United States) Atlas IIA		(United States) Cape Canaveral LC-36A		(United States) (Russia) International Launch Services	
15 December; 00:23	(United States) Galaxy 3R	PanAmSat	Geosynchronous	Communications	In orbit	Spacecraft failure
15 December; 00:23	Failed March 2006					
18 December; 14:31	(Russia) Soyuz-U		(Kazakhstan) Baikonur Site 1/5		(Russia) VKS	
18 December; 14:31	(Russia) Progress M-30	Roskosmos	Low Earth (Mir)	Logistics	22 February 1996; 11:02	Successful
20 December; 00:52	(Ukraine) Tsyklon-2		(Kazakhstan) Baikonur Site 90/20		(Russia) VKS	
20 December; 00:52	(Russia) Kosmos 2326 (EORSAT)	MO RF	Low Earth	SIGINT	8 November 1997	Successful
28 December; 06:45	(Russia) Molniya-M		(Kazakhstan) Baikonur Site 31/6		(Russia) VKS	
28 December; 06:45	(India) IRS-1C	ISRO	Low Earth	Remote sensing	In orbit	Successful
28 December; 06:45	(United States) Skipper	Utah State	Low Earth	Aerobraking experiment	In orbit	Spacecraft failure
28 December; 06:45	Skipper suffered a solar array malfunction					
28 December; 11:50	(China) Long March 2E		(China) Xichang LC-2		(China) CASC	
28 December; 11:50	(United States) EchoStar 1	EchoStar	Geosynchronous	Communications	In orbit	Operational
28 December; 11:50	Final flight of Long March 2E					
30 December; 13:48	(United States) Delta II 7920-10		(United States) Cape Canaveral LC-17A		(United States) Boeing IDS	
30 December; 13:48	(United States) RXTE	NASA	Low Earth	X-ray astronomy	30 April 2018	Successful

- ← Jan
- Feb
- Mar
- Apr
- May
- Jun
- Jul
- Aug
- Sep
- Oct
- Nov
- Dec →

== Suborbital launches ==
- ← Jan
- Feb
- Mar
- Apr
- May
- Jun
- Jul
- Aug
- Sep
- Oct
- Nov
- Dec →

Date and time (UTC)	Rocket	Flight number	Launch site		LSP	
Date and time (UTC)	Payload (⚀ = CubeSat)	Operator	Orbit	Function	Decay (UTC)	Outcome
Date and time (UTC)	Remarks					
=== January-March ===
19 January	(United States) UGM-133 Trident II		(United States) Submarine, Eastern Range		(United States) US Navy	
19 January		US Navy	Suborbital	Missile test	19 January	Successful
19 January	(United States) UGM-133 Trident II		(United States) Submarine, Eastern Range		(United States) US Navy	
19 January		US Navy	Suborbital	Missile test	19 January	Successful
19 January; 20:01	(United States) LGM-118 Peacekeeper		(United States) Vandenberg LF-02		(United States) US Air Force	
19 January; 20:01		US Air Force	Suborbital	Missile test	19 January	Successful
23 January; 12:30	(Japan) S-520		(Japan) Uchinoura LA-K		(Japan) ISAS	
23 January; 12:30		ISAS	Suborbital	Infrared astronomy	23 January	Successful
25 January; 03:54	(Canada) Black Brant XII		(Norway) Andøya		(United States) NASA	
25 January; 03:54	(United States) SCIFER	NASA	Suborbital	Ionospheric research	25 January	Successful
25 January; 03:54	Apogee: 1,453 kilometres (903 mi). Launch led to Norwegian rocket incident; Russia briefly mistook the launch as a potential nuclear attack despite receiving prior notice of the launch.					
28 January; 16:00	(Japan) S-520		(Japan) Uchinoura LA-K		(Japan) ISAS	
28 January; 16:00		ISAS	Suborbital	Ultraviolet astronomy	28 January	Successful
1 February	(United States) LGM-30G Minuteman III		(United States) Vandenberg LF-09		(United States) US Air Force	
1 February	(United States) GT-156GM	US Air Force	Suborbital	Missile test	1 February	Successful
2 February; 15:27	(Canada) Black Brant VIIIC		(United States) Poker Flat		(United States) NASA	
2 February; 15:27		NASA	Suborbital	Ionospheric research	2 February	Successful
2 February; 15:51	(United States) Nike Tomahawk		(United States) Poker Flat		(United States) NASA	
2 February; 15:51		NASA	Suborbital	Ionospheric research	2 February	Successful
7 February	(United States) Storm		(United States) White Sands		(United States) US Air Force	
7 February	(United States) BTTV-6	US Air Force	Suborbital	Target	7 February	Successful
12 February	(United States) Aries		(United States) Wallops Island		(United States) BMDO	
12 February	(United States) LEAP	BMDO	Suborbital	Target	7 February	Successful
14 February	(France) M4		(France) Centre d'Essais des Landes		(France)	
14 February			Suborbital	Missile test	14 February	Successful
24 February; 10:21	(Canada) Black Brant XII		(United States) Poker Flat		(United States) NASA	
24 February; 10:21	(United States) AMICIST	NASA	Suborbital	Auroral research	24 February	Successful
4 March	(United States) Aries		(United States) Wallops Island		(United States) BMDO	
4 March	(United States) LEAP	BMDO	Suborbital	Target	4 March	Successful
6 March	(United States) UGM-96 Trident I		(United States) Submarine, Eastern Range		(United States) US Navy	
6 March		US Navy	Suborbital	Missile test	6 March	Successful
6 March	(United States) UGM-96 Trident I		(United States) Submarine, Eastern Range		(United States) US Navy	
6 March		US Navy	Suborbital	Missile test	6 March	Successful
6 March	(United States) UGM-96 Trident I		(United States) Submarine, Eastern Range		(United States) US Navy	
6 March		US Navy	Suborbital	Missile test	6 March	Successful
14 March	(United States) UGM-96 Trident I		(United States) Submarine, Eastern Range		(United States) US Navy	
14 March		US Navy	Suborbital	Missile test	14 March	Successful
14 March	(United States) UGM-96 Trident I		(United States) Submarine, Eastern Range		(United States) US Navy	
14 March		US Navy	Suborbital	Missile test	14 March	Successful
15 March; 20:21	(United States) Nike Orion		(United States) Wallops Island		(United States) NASA	
15 March; 20:21		NASA	Suborbital	Test rocket	15 March	Successful
17 March	(United States) LGM-30G Minuteman III		(United States) Vandenberg LF-09		(United States) US Air Force	
17 March	(United States) GT-159GM	US Air Force	Suborbital	Missile test	17 March	Successful
19 March; 15:00	(United States) Nike Orion		(United States) White Sands		(United States) NASA	
19 March; 15:00	(United States) CWAS-37	NASA	Suborbital	Aeronomy	19 March	Successful
21 March; 19:11	(Canada) Black Brant IX		(United States) White Sands LC-36		(United States) NASA	
21 March; 19:11	(United States) PIMS	NASA	Suborbital	Ionospheric research	21 March	Successful
25 March; 08:55	(Canada) Black Brant XCM1		(United States) Poker Flat		(United States) NASA	
25 March; 08:55		NASA	Suborbital	Ionospheric research	25 March	Successful
27 March; 15:40	(United States) Nike Orion		(United States) White Sands		(United States) NASA	
27 March; 15:40	(United States) CWAS-38	NASA	Suborbital	Astronomy	27 March	Successful
28 March	(United States) Aries		(United States) Wallops Island		(United States) BMDO	
28 March	(United States) LEAP	BMDO	Suborbital	Target	28 March	Successful
=== April-June ===
1 April; 09:33	(Canada) Black Brant IX		(United States) Poker Flat		(United States) NASA	
1 April; 09:33		NASA	Suborbital	Aeronomy	1 April	Successful
9 April	(United States) UGM-133 Trident II		(United States) Submarine, Eastern Range		(United States) US Navy	
9 April		US Navy	Suborbital	Missile test	9 April	Successful
9 April	(United States) UGM-133 Trident II		(United States) Submarine, Eastern Range		(United States) US Navy	
9 April		US Navy	Suborbital	Missile test	9 April	Successful
14 April; 11:30	(Russia) RT-2PM Topol		(Russia) Plesetsk Site 158		(Russia) RVSN	
14 April; 11:30		RVSN	Suborbital	Missile test	14 April	Successful
15 April; 10:07	(Canada) Black Brant IX		(United States) White Sands LC-36		(United States) NASA	
15 April; 10:07		NASA	Suborbital	Aeronomy	15 April	Successful
18 April; 18:00	(Canada) Black Brant IX		(United States) White Sands LC-36		(United States) NASA	
18 April; 18:00		NASA	Suborbital	Solar research	18 April	Successful
21 April; 15:04	(United States) THAAD		(United States) White Sands		(United States) US Air Force	
21 April; 15:04		US Air Force	Suborbital	Test flight	21 April	Successful
21 April; 15:04	Maiden flight of THAAD					
24 April	(United States) Hera		(United States) White Sands LC-32		(United States) US Air Force	
24 April		US Air Force	Suborbital	Test flight	24 April	Successful
24 April	Maiden flight of Hera					
29 April; 05:55	(United States) Nike Orion		(Sweden) Esrange		(Germany) DLR	
29 April; 05:55	(Germany) Mini-Texus 4	DLR	Suborbital	Microgravity research	29 April	Successful
2 May; 05:55	(United States) Nike Orion		(Sweden) Esrange		(Germany) DLR	
2 May; 05:55	(Germany) Mini-Texus 3	DLR	Suborbital	Microgravity research	2 May	Successful
15 May; 18:00	(Canada) Black Brant IX		(United States) White Sands LC-36		(United States) NASA	
15 May; 18:00	(United States) SERTS-35	NASA	Suborbital	Solar research	15 May	Successful
22 May; 07:05	(Canada) Black Brant IX		(United States) White Sands LC-36		(United States) NASA	
22 May; 07:05		NASA	Suborbital	Astronomy	22 May	Successful
29 May	(China) Long March 1D		(China) Taiyuan LC-1		(China) CASC	
29 May		CASC	Suborbital	Test flight	29 May	Successful
29 May	Maiden flight of Long March 1D					
6 June; 22:00	(United States) Taurus Orion		(United States) Poker Flat		(United States) NASA	
6 June; 22:00		NASA	Suborbital	Ionospheric research	6 June	Successful
6 June; 22:10	(Russia) Volna		(Russia) Submarine, Barents Sea		(Russia) Russian Navy	
6 June; 22:10	(Germany) TCM	ZARM	Suborbital	Test flight	6 June	Successful
6 June; 22:10	Maiden flight of Volna					
8 June; 12:45	(Russia) UR-100N		(Kazakhstan) Baikonur		(Russia) RVSN	
8 June; 12:45		RVSN	Suborbital	Missile test	8 June	Successful
14 June	(United States) LGM-118 Peacekeeper		(United States) Vandenberg LF-05		(United States) US Air Force	
14 June		US Air Force	Suborbital	Missile test	14 June	Successful
26 June	(United States) Strypi IX		(United States) Barking Sands		(United States) US Air Force	
26 June	(United States) ETCE-11	US Air Force	Suborbital	Target	26 June	Failure
29 June	(United States) Strypi IX		(United States) Barking Sands		(United States) US Air Force	
29 June	(United States) ETCE-12	US Air Force	Suborbital	Target	29 June	Successful
30 June; 18:00	(United States) Terrier-Orion		(United States) Wallops Island		(United States) NASA	
30 June; 18:00		NASA	Suborbital	Test rocket	30 June	Successful
=== July-September ===
24 July; 22:30	(United States) UGM-133 Trident II		(United Kingdom) HMS Victorious, Eastern Range		(United Kingdom) Royal Navy	
24 July; 22:30		Royal Navy	Suborbital	Missile test	24 July	Successful
24 July; 22:30	First missile launch from HMS Victorious					
26 July; 09:33	(United States) Nike Orion		(United States) Poker Flat		(United States) NASA	
26 July; 09:33		NASA	Suborbital	Ionospheric research	26 July	Successful
31 July	(United States) THAAD		(United States) White Sands		(United States) US Air Force	
31 July		US Air Force	Suborbital	Test flight	31 July	Successful
July	(China) DF-21		(China) Taiyuan		(China)	
July			Suborbital	Missile test	+15 minutes	Successful
8 August; 08:20	(United States) Nike Orion		(United States) Poker Flat		(United States) NASA	
8 August; 08:20		NASA	Suborbital	Ionospheric research	8 August	Successful
16 August	(United States) Storm		(United States) White Sands LC-36		(United States) US Air Force	
16 August	(United States) MTD-1	US Air Force	Suborbital	GPS targeting	16 August	Successful
16 August	(India) RH-560		(India) Sriharikota		(India) ISRO	
16 August		ISRO	Suborbital	Test rocket	16 August	Successful
22 August	(United States) UGM-133 Trident II		(United Kingdom) HMS Victorious, Eastern Range		(United Kingdom) Royal Navy	
22 August		Royal Navy	Suborbital	Missile test	22 August	Successful
24 August; 20:00	(Japan) TR-1		(Japan) Tanegashima LA-T		(Japan) NASDA	
24 August; 20:00		NASDA	Suborbital	Microgravity research	24 August	Successful
25 August	(Russia) R-39 Rif		(Russia) Submarine, North Pole		(Russia) Russian Navy	
25 August		Russian Navy	Suborbital	Missile test	25 August	Successful
28 August; 17:30	(Canada) Black Brant IX		(United States) White Sands LC-36		(United States) NASA	
28 August; 17:30		NASA	Suborbital	Test rocket	28 August	Successful
30 August	(United States) LGM-118 Peacekeeper		(United States) Vandenberg LF-02		(United States) US Air Force	
30 August		US Air Force	Suborbital	Missile test	30 August	Successful
2 September; 01:13	(Canada) Black Brant IX		(United States) White Sands LC-36		(United States) NASA	
2 September; 01:13	(United States) Thunderstorm III	NASA	Suborbital	Ionospheric research	2 September	Successful
5 September; 07:50	(Russia) RT-2PM Topol		(Russia) Plesetsk Site 158		(Russia) RVSN	
5 September; 07:50		RVSN	Suborbital	Missile test	5 September	Successful
12 September; 18:05	(Canada) Black Brant 9CM1		(United States) White Sands LC-36		(United States) NASA	
12 September; 18:05		NASA	Suborbital	Solar research	12 September	Successful
17 September; 07:30	(Japan) S-520		(Japan) Uchinoura LA-K		(Japan) ISAS	
17 September; 07:30		ISAS	Suborbital	Technology demonstration	17 September	Failure
=== October-December ===
2 October	(United States) Hera		(United States) White Sands LC-94		(United States) US Air Force	
2 October		US Air Force	Suborbital	Target	2 October	Successful
10 October	(Russia) RT-2PM Topol		(Russia) Plesetsk Site 158		(Russia) RVSN	
10 October		RVSN	Suborbital	Missile test	10 October	Successful
13 October	(United States) Storm		(United States) White Sands SULF		(United States) US Air Force	
13 October	(United States) BTTV-9	US Air Force	Suborbital	ABM target	13 October	Successful
13 October	(United States) THAAD		(United States) White Sands		(United States) US Air Force	
13 October		US Air Force	Suborbital	ABM test	13 October	Successful
25 October; 13:13	(Canada) Black Brant IX		(Australia) Woomera LA-2-N		(United States) NASA	
25 October; 13:13		NASA	Suborbital	X-ray astronomy	25 October	Successful
28 October; 18:00	(Canada) Black Brant IX		(Australia) Woomera LA-2-N		(United States) NASA	
28 October; 18:00		NASA	Suborbital	Astronomy	28 October	Successful
29 October	(United States) UGM-96 Trident I		(United States) Submarine, Eastern Range		(United States) US Navy	
29 October		US Navy	Suborbital	Missile test	29 October	Successful
2 November	(Russia) Kosmos-3MR		(Russia) Kapustin Yar Site 107		(Russia) RVSN	
2 November	(Russia) Re-entry vehicle	RVSN	Suborbital	Test re-entry vehicle	2 November	Successful
5 November; 16:14	(Canada) Black Brant IX		(Australia) Woomera LA-2-N		(United States) NASA	
5 November; 16:14		NASA	Suborbital	Astronomy	5 November	Successful
7 November; 06:38	(Canada) Black Brant XII		(United States) Poker Flat		(United States) NASA	
7 November; 06:38	(Canada) OEDIPUS-C	CSA	Suborbital	Ionospheric research	7 November	Successful
10 November	(China) DF-21		(China) Taiyuan		(China)	
10 November			Suborbital	Missile test	10 November	Successful
14 November; 17:04	(Canada) Black Brant IX		(Australia) Woomera LA-2-N		(United States) NASA	
14 November; 17:04		NASA	Suborbital	Astronomy	14 November	Successful
19 November; 15:30	(Canada) Black Brant IX		(Australia) Woomera LA-2-N		(United States) NASA	
19 November; 15:30		NASA	Suborbital	Astronomy	19 November	Successful
20 November; 17:00	(Canada) Black Brant IX		(Australia) Woomera LA-2-N		(United States) NASA	
20 November; 17:00		NASA	Suborbital	Astronomy	20 November	Successful
24 November; 14:00	(United States) Nike Tomahawk		(United States) Poker Flat		(United States) NASA	
24 November; 14:00		NASA	Ionospheric research		24 November	Successful
27 November; 08:03	(United States) Nike Tomahawk		(United States) Poker Flat		(United States) NASA	
27 November; 08:03		NASA	Suborbital	Ionospheric research	27 November	Successful
27 November; 08:07	(Canada) Black Brant VIIIC		(United States) Poker Flat		(United States) NASA	
27 November; 08:07		NASA	Suborbital	Ionospheric research	27 November	Successful
28 November; 09:42	(Sweden) Maxus		(Sweden) Esrange		(Sweden) SSC	
28 November; 09:42		DLR	Suborbital	Microgravity research	28 November	Successful
4 December; 11:20	(Canada) Black Brant VIIIC		(United States) White Sands LC-36		(United States) NASA	
4 December; 11:20		NASA	Suborbital	X-ray astronomy	4 December	Successful
7 December	(United States) UGM-133 Trident II		(United States) Submarine, Eastern Range		(United States) US Navy	
7 December		US Navy	Suborbital	Missile test	7 December	Successful
13 December	(United States) Storm		(United States) White Sands SULF		(United States) US Air Force	
13 December	(United States) BTTV-10	US Air Force	Suborbital	ABM target	13 December	Successful
13 December	(United States) THAAD		(United States) White Sands		(United States) US Air Force	
13 December		US Air Force	Suborbital	ABM test	13 December	Successful

- ← Jan
- Feb
- Mar
- Apr
- May
- Jun
- Jul
- Aug
- Sep
- Oct
- Nov
- Dec →

== Deep Space Rendezvous ==
Date (GMT)	Spacecraft	Event	Remarks
7 December	Galileo	First impact of spacecraft to Jupiter - subprobe descent through the Jovian atmosphere	
8 December	Galileo	First orbiter of Jupiter - jovian orbit insertion	
no date	Ulysses	Pass over solar north pole	

== EVAs ==
Start date/time	Duration	End time	Spacecraft	Crew	Remarks
9 February; 11:56	4 hours 39 minutes	16:35	STS-63; Discovery	(United Kingdom) / (United States) Michael Foale (United States) Bernard A. Harris, Jr.	Conducted a test of moving large mass objects and tested the effectiveness of the new spacesuit temperature control underwear by being lofted outside the payload bay by the RMS.
12 May; 04:20	6 hours 15 minutes	10:35	Mir EO-18; Kvant-2	(Russia) Vladimir Dezhurov (Russia) Gennadi Strekalov	Made preparations for the arrival of the Spektr module. Installed some electrical cable attachments, adjusted solar array actuators, and practiced folding the Kristall solar arrays for the future move to Kvant-1.
17 May; 02:38	6 hours 42 minutes	09:20	Mir EO-18; Kvant-2	(Russia) Vladimir Dezhurov (Russia) Gennadi Strekalov	Moved the solar arrays from Kristall to Kvant-1. Their suits ran low on oxygen before they were able to re-install the arrays on Kvant-1.
22 May; 00:10	5 hours 15 minutes	05:25	Mir EO-18; Kvant-2	(Russia) Vladimir Dezhurov (Russia) Gennadi Strekalov	Completed installation of the relocated solar array on Kvant-1. Also retracted some solar panels to prepare for moving Kristall.
28 May; 22:22	21 minutes	22:43	Mir EO-18 base block	(Russia) Vladimir Dezhurov (Russia) Gennadi Strekalov	Conducting a spacewalk inside the transfer compartment of the Mir base block Dezhurov and Strekalov relocated a docking cone from the -X port to the -Z port.
1 June; 22:05	23 minutes	22:28	Mir EO-18 base block	(Russia) Vladimir Dezhurov (Russia) Gennadi Strekalov	Again working from the depressurized base block transfer compartment, Dezhurov and Strekalov prepared to move the recently arrived Spektr module by relocating a docking cone from the -Z port to the -Y port.
14 July; 03:56	5 hours 34 minutes	09:30	Mir EO-19; Kvant-2	(Russia) Anatoly Solovyev (Russia) Nikolai Budarin	Used the Strela boom to move to the Spektr module and freed the stuck solar array. Also inspected the -Z docking port and found it to be undamaged.
19 July; 00:39	3 hours 8 minutes	03:47	Mir EO-19; Kvant-2	(Russia) Anatoly Solovyev (Russia) Nikolai Budarin	Solovyev had problems with his Orlan-DMA spacesuit cooling system, and had to stay tethered to an umbilical at Kvant-2. Budarin was able work his way to the far end of Spektr and do some preparations for the installation of the Mir infrared spectrometer (MIRAS). He also collected the American TREK cosmic ray panel that had been installed on Kvant-2 since 1991.
21 July; 00:28	5 hours 50 minutes	06:18	Mir EO-19; Kvant-2	(Russia) Anatoly Solovyev (Russia) Nikolai Budarin	Used the Strela boom to reach the Spektr module, where they completed the installation of MIRAS.
16 September; 08:20	6 hours 46 minutes	15:06	STS-69; Endeavour	(United States) James S. Voss (United States) Michael L. Gernhardt	Installed thermal instruments on the apparatus in the payload bay. Also tested redesigned spacesuit helmet lights and spacesuit heaters.
20 October; 11:50	5 hours 16 minutes	17:06	Mir EO-20; Kvant-2	(Russia) Sergei Avdeyev (Germany) Thomas Reiter	Used the Strela boom to move to the Spektr module and installed several experiments on the European Space Exposure Facility. Reiter became the first ESA cosmonaut and German to complete an EVA.
8 December; 19:23	29 minutes	19:52	Mir EO-20 base block	(Russia) Sergei Avdeyev (Russia) Yuri Gidzenko	From inside the depressurized base block transfer compartment, Avdeyev and Gidzenko moved the Konus docking cone from the -Z port to the +Z port..
