= Intelsat 705 =

Geostationary communication satellite

- Mission type: Communications
- Operator: Intelsat
- COSPAR ID: 1995-013A
- SATCAT no.: 23528
- Mission duration: 15 years design life

Spacecraft properties
- Bus: SSL-1300
- Manufacturer: Space Systems/Loral
- Launch mass: 3,695 kilograms (8,146 lb)
- Dry mass: 1,450 kilograms (3,200 lb)

Start of mission
- Launch date: 22 March 1995, 06:18 UTC
- Rocket: Atlas IIAS
- Launch site: Cape Canaveral LC-36B

End of mission
- Disposal: Decommissioned
- Deactivated: January 2011

Orbital parameters
- Reference system: Geocentric
- Regime: Geostationary now graveyard orbit
- Longitude: 29.5° W
- Semi-major axis: 42,533 kilometres (26,429 mi)
- Perigee altitude: 36,089.1 kilometres (22,424.7 mi)
- Apogee altitude: 36,235.5 kilometres (22,515.7 mi)
- Inclination: 5.8°
- Period: 1,455.0 minutes
- Epoch: April 28, 2017

Transponders
- Band: 26 C band 10 Ku band

Intelsat 705 (also known as IS-705 and Intelsat 7-F5) is a geostationary communication satellite that was built by Space Systems/Loral (SSL). It is located in the orbital position of 29.5 degrees west longitude and it is currently in an inclined orbit. The same is owned by Intelsat. The satellite was based on the LS-1300 platform and its estimated useful life was 15 years.

The satellite was successfully launched into space on March 22, 1995, at 06:18, using an Atlas IIAS vehicle from the Cape Canaveral Air Force Station, United States. It had a launch mass of 3,695 kg.

The Intelsat 705 is equipped with 26 transponders in C band and 10 in Ku band to provide broadcasting, business-to-home services, telecommunications, VSATnetworks.

== See also ==
- 1995 in spaceflight
