= Soyuz TM-21 =

1995 Russian crewed spaceflight to Mir

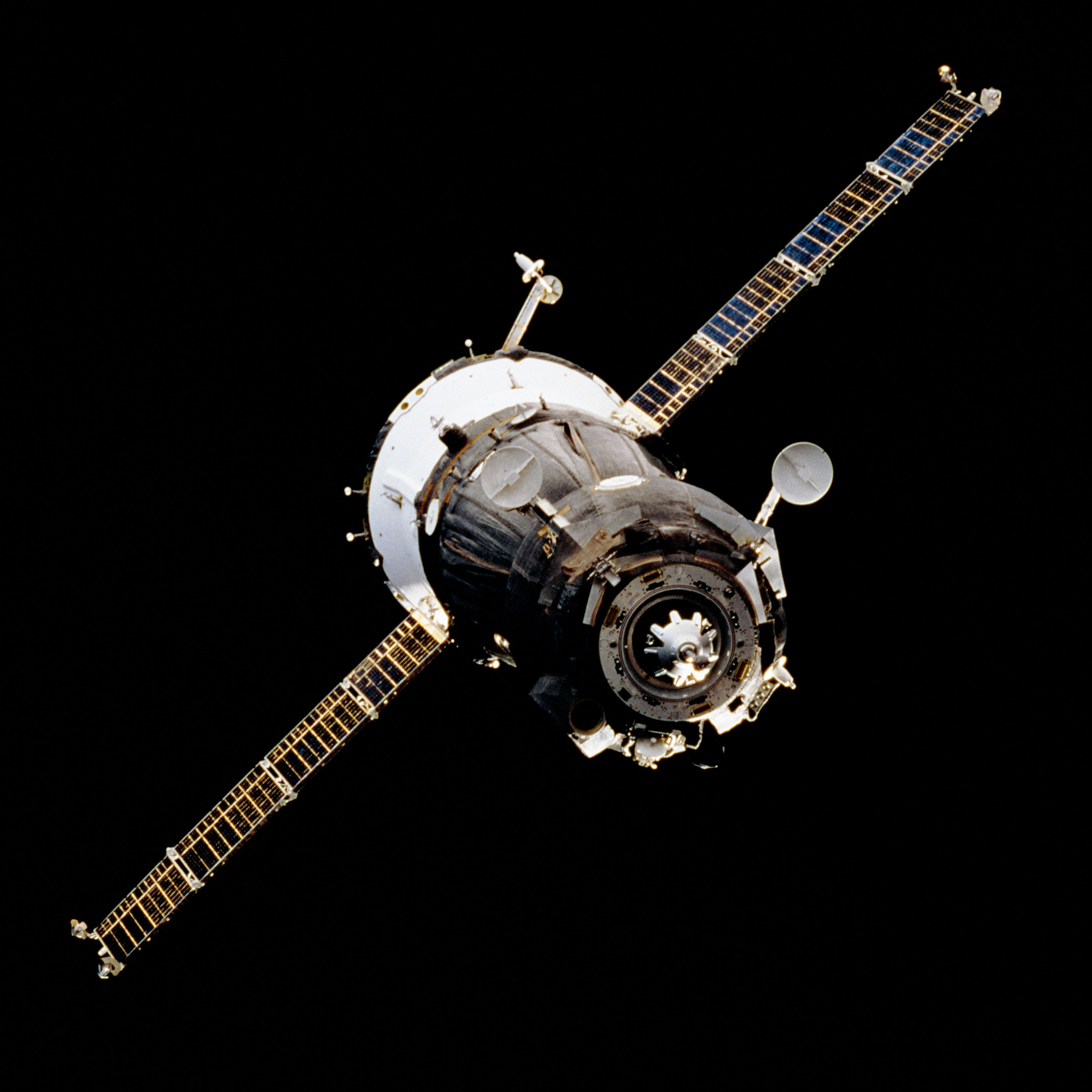
- Soyuz TM-21 photographed by the crew of STS-71
- Operator: Russian Space Agency
- COSPAR ID: 1995-010A
- SATCAT no.: 23519
- Mission duration: 181 days, 41 minutes, 6 seconds
- Orbits completed: ~2,940

Spacecraft properties
- Spacecraft: Soyuz 7K-STM No. 70
- Spacecraft type: Soyuz-TM
- Manufacturer: Energia
- Launch mass: 7,170 kg (15,810 lb)

Crew
- Crew size: 3 up, 2 down
- Launching: Vladimir Dezhurov; Gennady Strekalov; Norman Thagard
- Landing: Anatoly Solovyev; Nikolai Budarin
- Callsign: Урага́н (lit. 'Hurricane')

Start of mission
- Launch date: 14 March 1995, 06:11:34 UTC
- Rocket: Soyuz-U2

End of mission
- Landing date: 11 September 1995, 06:52:40 UTC
- Landing site: 50.67°N 68.25°E

Orbital parameters
- Reference system: Geocentric
- Regime: Low Earth
- Perigee altitude: 200 km (120 mi)
- Apogee altitude: 249.6 km (155.1 mi)
- Inclination: 51.65°
- Period: 88.7 minutes

Docking with Mir
- Docking port: Kvant-1
- Docking date: 16 March 1995, 7:45:26 UTC
- Undocking date: 11 September 1995, 3:30:44 UTC
- Time docked: 178 days, 19 hours, 45 minutes, 18 seconds
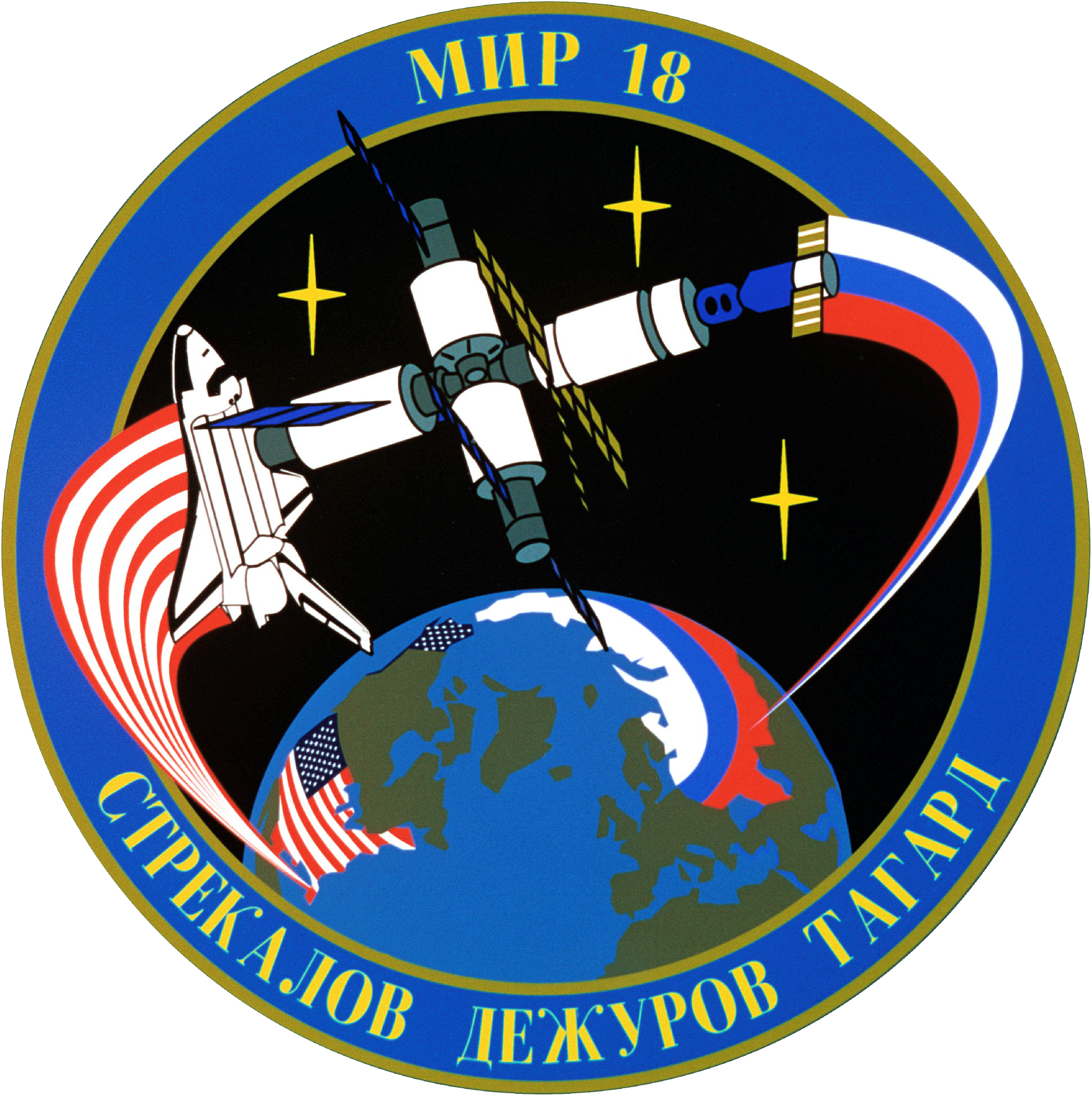
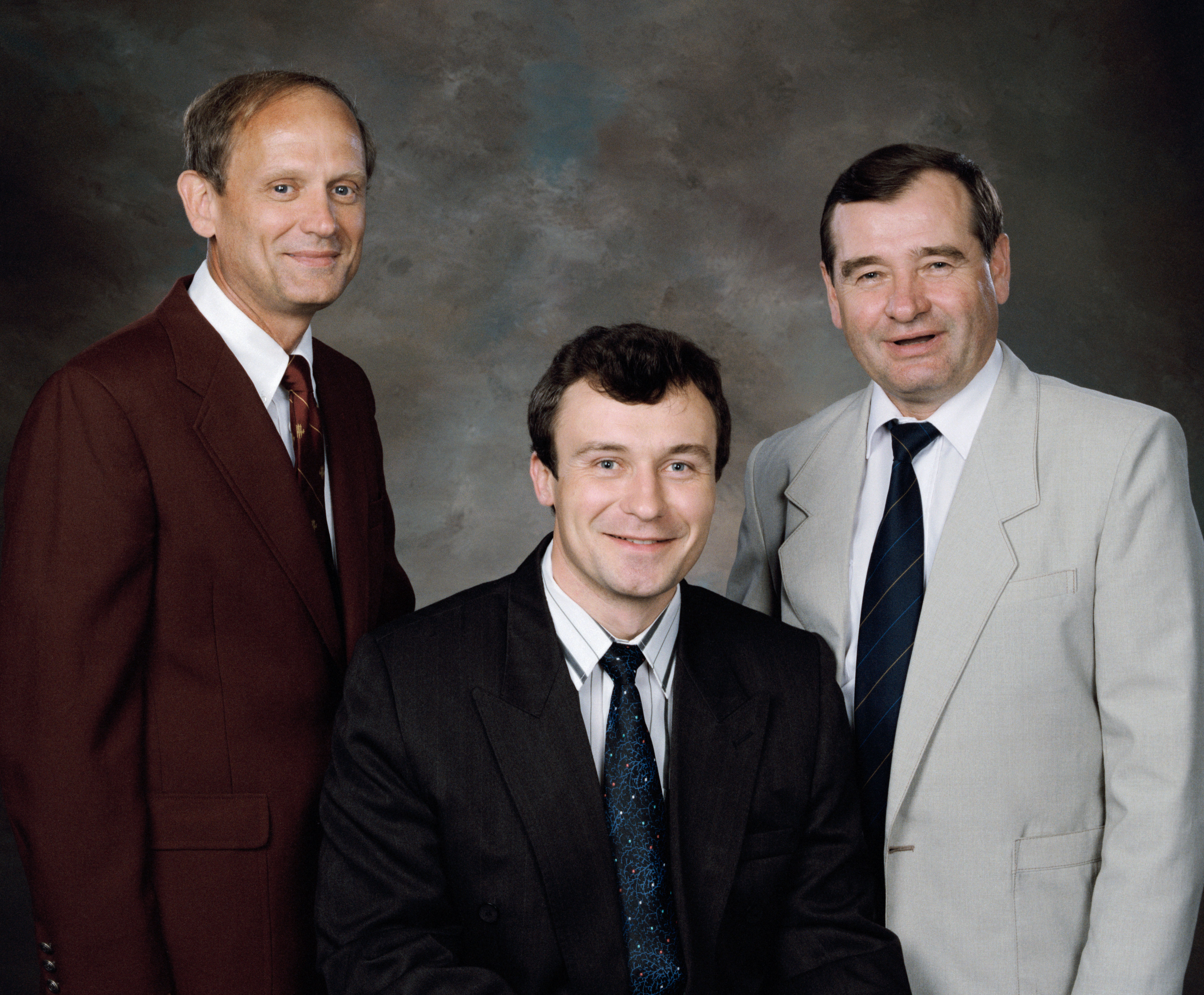
- Launching crew, from left: Thagard, Dezhurov and Strekalov Soyuz programme (Crewed missions)

Soyuz TM-21 was a crewed Soyuz spaceflight to Mir. The mission launched from Baikonur Cosmodrome, atop a Soyuz-U2 carrier rocket, at 06:11:34 UTC on 14 March 1995. The flight marked the first time thirteen humans were flying in space simultaneously, with three aboard the Soyuz, three aboard Mir and seven aboard Space Shuttle Endeavour, flying STS-67.

The spacecraft carried expedition EO-18 to the space station. This included the first American astronaut to launch on a Soyuz spacecraft and board Mir, Norman Thagard, for the American Thagard Increment aboard the station, which was the first Increment of the Shuttle-Mir program. The three crew members it launched were relieved by Space Shuttle Atlantis during STS-71, when they were replaced by expedition EO-19. The crew returned to earth aboard Soyuz TM-21 on 11 September 1995.

== Crew ==
| Position | Launching crew | Landing crew |
|---|---|---|
| Commander | Vladimir Dezhurov, RSA; First spaceflight | Anatoly Solovyev, RSA; Fourth spaceflight |
| Flight engineer | Gennady Strekalov, RSA; Fifth and last spaceflight | Nikolai Budarin, RSA; First spaceflight |
| Research cosmonaut | Norman Thagard, NASA; Fifth and last spaceflight | None |

== Mir Principal Expedition 18 ==
The major objectives of the Mir 18 mission were to conduct joint U.S.-Russian medical research and weightlessness effects investigations and to reconfigure the station for the arrival of the Spektr science module and the Space Shuttle Atlantis. The historic mission saw the addition of the first new module (Spektr) since Kristall arrived in 1990, the first American (Thagard) to be part of a Mir crew, and the first docking of a U.S. spacecraft with the Mir space station.

=== March 1995 – Mir 18 Arrives/Mir 17 Departs ===
==== Progress M-26 Undocks for Soyuz TM-21 to Dock ====
Progress M-26 separated from the complex on 15 March and made a destructive reentry into the Earth's atmosphere to clear the Kvant docking port for the new Soyuz. Soyuz TM-21 docked by automatic control at the Kvant docking port on the first try at 7:45 UTC on 16 March. The new arrivals were greeted by the Mir 17 crew with the traditional Russian gifts of salt and bread, and shortly thereafter were congratulated on a successful docking and transfer by Russian Space Agency (RSA) Director General Yuri Koptev and NASA Associate Administrator Wayne Littles. The crew spent much of the day transferring equipment and supplies from Soyuz to Mir. Norman Thagard spoke with STS-67 Commander Steve Oswald in a radio hookup, exchanging congratulations on their respective flights and discussing the symbolic importance of Thagard's venture as the first American to visit Mir.

On 17 March, Russian Prime Minister Viktor Chernomyrdin stopped by the TsUP to congratulate the crew. Later, in a televised communication with ground controllers, Thagard said he hoped his visit to Mir would be the start of long-term space cooperation between the two nations. He and Polyakov agreed that the present joint research might be the foundation for ultimate joint flights to Mars.

During the next few days, the Mir 18 crew took their body mass measurements as a baseline for investigations throughout the mission and were briefed by the Mir 17 crew on the status of the complex and ongoing studies. The outgoing crew stowed equipment and experiment samples in Soyuz TM-20 for their return and checked out the vehicle systems.

==== Mir 17 Mission Ends ====
Aleksandr Viktorenko, Yelena Kondakova and Valeri Polyakov entered Soyuz TM-20 on 21 March and departed from Mir on 22 March, landing safely on the same day about 50 km from Arkalyk, Kazakhstan. Polyakov had set a new record for spaceflight duration: he had been on Mir since 8 January 1994 for 438 straight days. This trip, added to his Mir stay in 1988, brought his total days in space to 679. He was, however, strong enough to walk to the chairs that rescue crews provided for the cosmonauts' transport to a field hospital. He said his fit condition was a positive indication that humans could withstand a trip to Mars.

==== Mir 18 Crew On Their Own ====
The Mir 18 crew settled into their daily routine, collecting body fluid samples for the seven metabolic experiments to be performed during their mission. They also took air and water samples for four hygiene, sanitation and radiation experiments which would determine the role of the Mir environment in human health, safety and efficiency. Each crewman spent time in a Chibis suit for measurement of cardiovascular system responses to lower body negative pressure. In the absence of gravity, blood pools in the upper torso and head, causing cardiovascular deconditioning. The Chibis suit sealed at the waist and incrementally induced a partial vacuum, or negative pressure, which drew body fluids back to the lower extremities. Dezhurov and Strekalov also changed out a condenser in the air conditioning system, part of a long-term maintenance program to prolong the life of the station.

=== April 1995 – Resupply and Maintenance ===
==== Progress M-27 Resupplies Mir ====
Progress M-27 was launched from Baikonur on 9 April. It docked with the Mir base block on 11 April at 21:00 UTC under flawless control by the automatic Kurs system, although Dezhurov was ready to take over by manual control if Kurs malfunctions recurred. This Progress module carried with it a Raduga return capsule.

==== Cosmonautics Day Observed on 12 April ====
On the 34th anniversary of Yuri Gagarin's flight in a Vostock capsule, the Mir crew had a light schedule for Cosmonautics Day, a Russian national holiday. Activities included press conferences through the Russian and U.S. mission control centers.

==== Progress Unloaded ====
On 13 April, the crew began unloading the Progress cargo of food, water, fuel, repair materials for life support systems and equipment for medical and environmental research. Among the biological experiments were some Japanese quail eggs. These, the crew put into an incubator on 14 April. Progress M-27 also brought a new international experiment in the form of GFZ-1, a spherical satellite with a mass of 20 kg and a diameter of 21 cm. The German satellite was built by the German firm Kayser-Threde. Geoforschungszentrum Potsdam would coordinate the satellite's transmission of geodetic measurements by means of laser reflection to about 25 observatories around the globe. GFZ-1 was successfully launched by the Mir crew from the base block airlock on 19 April. Two days before, the crew had launched a container with garbage as a practice run for the operation.

==== Interior Station Work ====
Late in April, the crew learned that extravehicular activities (EVAs) for solar array work, scheduled to start on 28 April, had been postponed due to a delay in launch of the Spektr module. One reason for the delay was that equipment to interface with Mir's manual control system was added to Spektr in case the Kurs system failed again. The crew continued routine experiment work, defrosted the ESA freezer, replaced a humidity control fan with one from Progress M-27, installed a battery unit in the Kristall module and began removing an unused shower in the Kvant module to make room for a new set of gyrodynes to support the upcoming Atlantis docking. They dismantled the shower and cut it into small pieces for stowage on the Progress module, then installed the gyrodynes.

=== May 1995 – Four EVAs ===
==== Injury Jeopardizes EVA Plans ====
ITAR-TASS reported on 5 May that Strekalov had scratched his hand earlier during cleaning tasks. The scratch became inflamed and caused some concern about Strekalov's ability to do the EVA work. Medical specialists on the ground viewed downlink video of the hand and prescribed a medication to be administered by Thagard. The injury healed and the EVA plans proceeded.

==== First Mir 18 EVA ====
On 12 May, Dezhurov and Strekalov began their first EVA to prepare the station for Spektr's arrival, exiting the Kvant 2 airlock at 4:20 UTC and transferring to the Kvant astrophysics module by means of the STrela boom. There they installed electrical cable attachments and adjusted solar array actuators. Then they moved to Kristall and practiced folding three panels of the solar array to be moved to Kvant. Thagard supported the crew from inside Mir by relaying instructions from the ground or from reference manuals when the station was not in range of ground communications. The spacewalk lasted 6 hours and 15 minutes.

==== Problems on the Second EVA ====
In their second space walk, on 17 May, the cosmonauts successfully folded the solar array panels, assisted by Thagard, who controlled servomotor switches from inside Kristall. The spacewalkers disconnected the array from Kristall, attached it to the Strela boom, and moved it to Kvant. The work took so much time that, having already almost used the oxygen available through their suits, they were forced to secure the array to Kvant with tool teathers and postpone electrical connection. Even so, the EVA lasted 6 hours and 52 minutes. Power supply inside the station suffered without the connection of the array, necessitating interim augmentation by Progress M-27 and Soyuz TM-21's solar arrays.

==== Solar Array Redeployed in Mir 18 Third EVA ====
On their 22 May walk of 5 hours and 15 minutes, Dezhurov and Strekalov successfully connected the solar array to Kvant, and Thagard commanded its redeployment from inside the station. The cosmonauts then returned to Kristall, where the retracted 13 panels of another solar array to provide clearance for rotation of Kristall during its relocation to make room for Spektr. Approximately 60% of that array was still available as a power source.

==== Progress M-27 Undocks to Free -X Port ====
Progress M-27 left Mir at 23:53 UTC on 22 May and made a destructive reentry into the Pacific on 23 May. Thus the -Y port was freed for use in the multiple module relocation that would be necessary for the docking and ultimate permanent placement of Spektr.

==== First Kristall Move and Fourth EVA ====
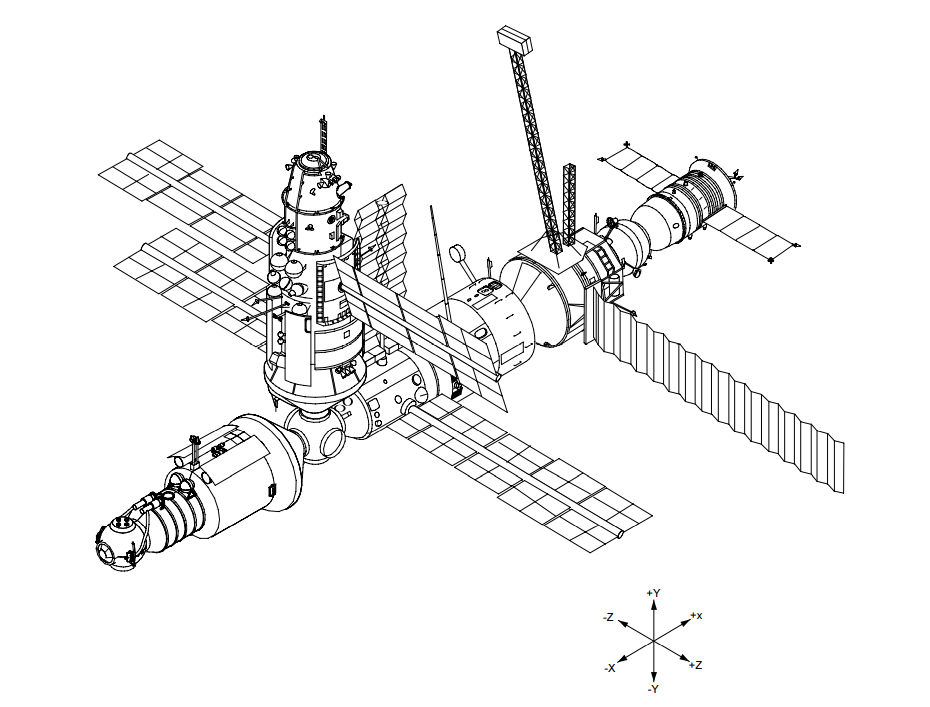
Mir Space Station on 26 May 1995, after Kristall relocation to the -X port. Soyuz TM-21 is at the +X port.

From inside the station, Dezhurov controlled the undocking of Kristall on 26 May from the -Y port. Then the module was moved by means of its Lyappa arm to the -X port just vacated by Progress M-27. On 28 May, in their fourth EVA of the mission, Dezhurov and Strekalov moved a docking cone (Konus), from the -Y port to the -Z port to serve as the docking receptacle for Kristall in its next move. The space-suited cosmonauts did this work from inside the depressurized base block transfer compartment.

==== Second Kristall Move ====
In another undocking and relocation sequence controlled rom inside the station, on 30 May, Kristall was moved from the -X port to the -Z port. Because of a temporary failure in the hydraulic connections, the docking was not successful until the third attempt.

=== June 1995 – Mir Expansion and Historic Docking ===
==== Spektr Docking and Fifth EVA ====
Despite anxieties about the automatic docking, the Spektr module successfully docked to the -X port under control of the Kurs system on 1 June. The next day, in their fifth EVA, the cosmonauts again entered the depressurized base block to transfer compartment and moved the Konus from the -Z to the -Y port. With the Mir crew and TsUP ground controllers in joint control of the Spektr Layappa arm, the module was moved to the -Y port on 2 June. After the redocking, the crew began checking out and activating the new module's systems and transferring new supplies of food, fueled and equipment from Spektr to other parts of the complex. On 5 June, one of Spektr's four solar arrays failed to fully unfurl because a restraint that held it in place for launch failed to release, and the crew was unable to extend it by sending pulses of power to the motor or by firing Mir's thrusters. TsUP controllers, aided by videos transmitted to them by the crew, began plans for a sixth EVA so that the cosmonauts could release the stuck array.

==== Thagard Surpasses Previous American Record ====
Norm Thagard held a press conference on 6 June, the day he surpassed the long-held record of U.S. human spaceflight duration of 84 days set by the Skylab 4 crew from 16 November 1973, to 8 February 1974.

==== Kristall Relocated Again ====
Before its last scheduled move of the Mir 18 mission, the cosmonauts had to install two new batteries in Kristall to boost its power supply enough to accomplish the undocking and redocking. Then on 10 June, the module was undocked from the -Z port, and again with the use of Lyappa, moved to the -X port.

==== Atlantis Launch on STS-71 ====
After 4 days of delays caused by bad weather at Kennedy Space Center, Atlantis was launched on 27 June at 19:32 UTC. About 3 hours after launch, Atlantis Commander Robert Gibson began a series of orbital maneuvering system firings that would, through the next 2 days, take Atlantis to Mir's orbit, gradually decreasing the closing rate as well as distance. On the second mission day, as they moved toward the station, Gibson, Charles Precourt and Bonnie Dunbar began activating the Spacelab module in preparations for life sciences investigations. The crew extended the Orbital Docking System (ODS) docking ring to the docking position and found it in excellent working order.

==== Historic Docking ====
On 29 June at 13:00 UTC, Gibson guided Atlantis to the docking port on the Kristall module and Harbaugh engaged the docking mechanism. The two spacecraft met 216 nautical miles above the Lake Baikal region of Russia. After pressurization and leak checks of the vestibule airlock, the two crews met and exchanged greetings and congratulations. There were ten of them, a new record of the largest crew ever aboard a single complex. The docked Mir and Atlantis totaled 220 tones, a new record for orbiting spacecraft mass.

=== July 1995 – Mir 18 completion ===
After Atlantis left the Russian space station on 4 July, the homeward-bound Mir 18 crew continued their medical and scientific investigations in the Spacelab module in Atlantis' payload bay. They used the lower body negative pressure unit and a baroreflex neck cuff to test cardiovascular orthostatic function response to microgravity.

== Mir Principal Expedition 19 ==
The only complete Mir mission of 1995 with an all-Russian crew, Mir 19 had many international elements. The first Mir crew launched on a Space Shuttle Orbiter, Anatoly Solovyev and Nikolai Budarin began their work in conjunction with a visiting U.S. crew and departing Mir 18 international crew. Two of their EVAs involved deployment and retrieval of internationals experiments. And they ended their stay by welcoming an incoming international crew.

=== July 1995 – Cosmic Ballet ===
==== The "Cosmic Ballet" ====
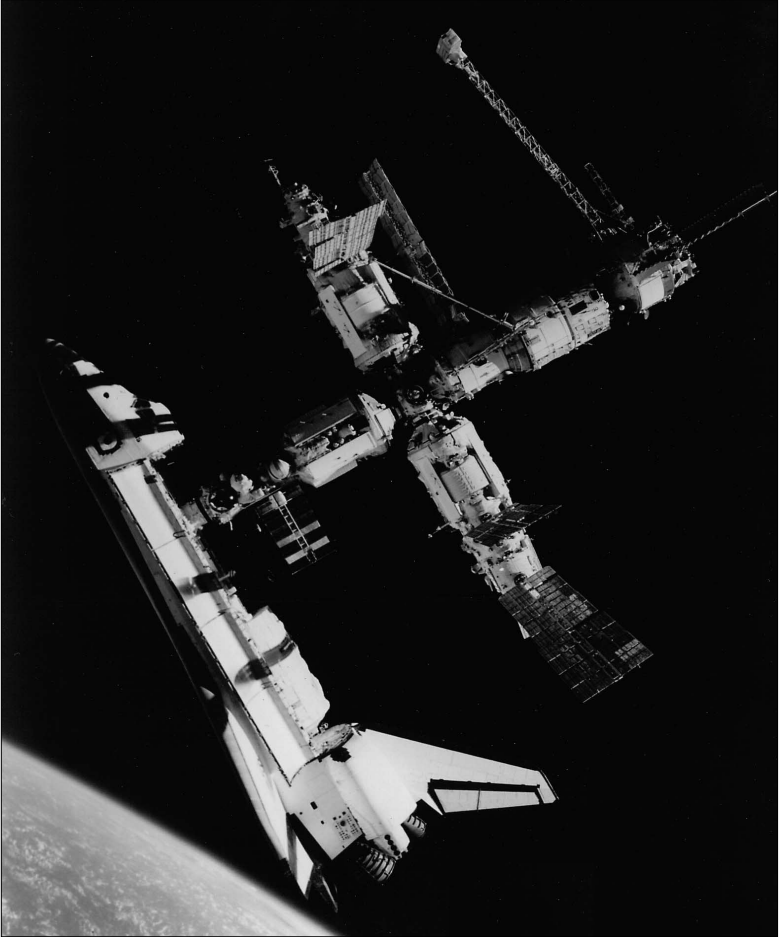
First docking of Atlantis with the Mir complex, 4 July 1995. Photographed by Solovyev and Budarin from the temporarily undocked Soyuz TM-21

On 4 July, Solovyev and Budarin donned their flight suits, entered Soyuz TM-21 and undocked from Mir to a station-keeping position from which they photographed Mir and Atlantis, still docked. About 15 minutes later, Atlantis undocked from Mir when Gibson released the hooks that held the two craft together and allowed the docking system springs to nudge Atlantis away. As Atlantis slowly flew around the station, Soyuz TM-21 redocked and the two craft continued to take pictures of each other and Mir. Gibson called this set of celestial maneuvers a "cosmic ballet." However, after the Soyuz module had to redock a few minutes sooner than planned when the Mir onboard computer which controls station attitude and solar array pointing malfunctioned. The station complex, about 10 degrees of the correct attitude, was becoming unstable and starting to drift. The cosmonauts had to get back quickly to regain attitude control of the station. TsUP controllers left the station in free drift while the cosmonauts replaced attitude-control hardware in the computer.

==== First EVA of Mir 19 ====
Before their launch, Solovyev and Budarin had trained to use the new tools created for releasing the stuck Spektr solar array. On 14 July, they exited the Kvant 2 hatch and made their way to Spektr using the Strela boom. They quickly cut the offending restraint, and all but one section of Spektr's jammed solar array deployed. Then they were able to route the power input to the complex. They inspected the -Z port docking mechanism and found no signs of damage or pollution, clearing the port for relocation of the Kristall module. Before reentering the Kvant 2 hatch, they inspected one of that module's solar arrays which was not tracking the sun correctly. Their EVA ran five hours and 34 minutes, about twenty minutes over the originally budgeted time.

==== Kristall Relocated Once More ====
In a 90-minute session on 17 July, Kristall was transferred by means of its Lyapa arm to the -Z docking port from the -X port where Progress M-28 docked later in July.

==== Problems During the Second Mir 19 EVA ====
The primary purpose of the second space walk on 19 July was to deploy the Belgian-French MIRAS (Mir infrared spectrometer) on the far end of the Spektr module. But minutes after the EA began, Solovyev's Orlan-DMA suit cooling system malfunctioned and the TsUP ordered him to stay attached by an umbilical to Kvant 2. The MIRAS deployment had to be postponed, but Budarin was able to do some preparatory work alone. he also retrieved the American cosmic ray detector, TREK, which had been on Kvant 2 surface since 1991 and switched out cassettes of sample construction materials as part of an ongoing space exposure experiment. his time outside totaled 3 hours and 8 minutes, but the troubles were not all over: After closing the Kvant 2 EVA hatch, the cosmonauts found a 2 mm gap in the seal through which air was escaping. They had to work with the hatch to get it tightly shut.

==== Progress M-28 Arrives ====
Launched by a Soyuz booster from Baikonur on 20 July, Progress M-28 bore 2.4 tons of food and water, fuel and oxidizer, and science equipment including about 335 kg for use during Euromir 95. Two days later, using the Kurs system, Progress M-28 docked at the -X port of the base block.

==== Installation of MIRAS During Third EVA ====
On 21 July, the cosmonauts opened the Kvant 2 hatch again and retrieved the cooling umbilical left outside in their last EVA. Using the Strela boom, they made their way to the Spektr module, on which they installed the 220 kg MIRAS spectrometer. This final EVA of Mir 18 lasted 5 hours and 35 minutes.

=== August 1995 – Interior Work ===
With their EVAs completed, the Mir 19 crew turned their attention to experiments in life sciences and astrophysics and smelting experiments in the Gallar furnace. They unloaded the cargo brought by the Progress module and monitored the automatic refueling by Progress of the base block propellant tanks. They also performed station maintenance and repairs, including installation in Kvant 2 of new gyrodynes brought up on Progress. They repaired the seals on other gyrodyne cases with a lute-type sealer called "germetik".

=== September 1995 – Progress M-28 Undocked, Soyuz TM-22 Docked and Soyuz TM-21 Undocked ===
==== Progress M-28 Undocks ====
Packed with trash and obsolete equipment, Progress M-28 left the -X port on 4 September and splashed down into the Pacific, thus clearing the way for Soyuz TM-22 to dock with the next Mir crew.

==== Mir 20 and Euromir 95 Crew Launched ====
Soyuz TM-22 was launched from Baikonur on 3 September at 8:58 UTC. After two days of autonomous orbital flight, on 5 September, the Soyuz spacecraft docked at the -X docking port.

==== Mir 19 Ends ====
Solovyev and Budarin ended their 75-day mission on 11 September, departing the station in the Soyuz TM-21 that had brought the Mir 18 crew up on 16 March. Their Soyuz made a safe landing in Kazakhstan, 302 km northeast of Arkalyk, "far away from the aiming point." Rescue parties, however, found the crew in excellent condition.

== Mission parameters ==
- Mass: 7,150 kg (15,760 lb)
- Perigee: 201 kg (443 lb)
- Apogee: 247 kg (545 lb)
- Inclination: 51.65°
- Period: 88.7 minutes
- First Mir docking: 16 March 1995, 07:45:26 UTC
- First Mir undocking: 4 July 1995, 10:55:01 UTC
- Second Mir docking: 4 July 1995, 11:38:12 UTC
- Second Mir undocking: 11 September 1995, 03:30:44 UTC
