= Sich-1 =

Ukrainian Earth observation satellite

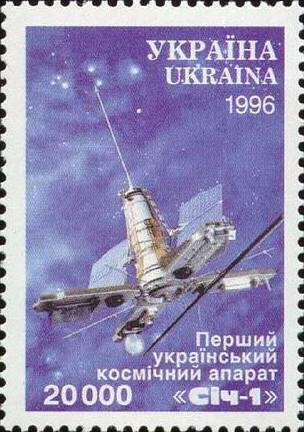
- Mission type: Earth observation
- COSPAR ID: 1995-046A
- SATCAT no.: 23657

Spacecraft properties
- Spacecraft type: Okean-O1
- Manufacturer: Yuzhmash
- Launch mass: 1,915 kilograms (4,222 lb)

Start of mission
- Launch date: 31 August 1995, 06:49:59 UTC
- Rocket: Tsyklon-3
- Launch site: Plesetsk 32/2

End of mission
- Deactivated: 2001

Orbital parameters
- Reference system: Geocentric
- Regime: Low Earth
- Eccentricity: 0.0022
- Perigee altitude: 659 kilometres (409 mi)
- Apogee altitude: 683 kilometres (424 mi)
- Inclination: 82.3 degrees
- Period: 98.7 minutes
- Epoch: 21 August 1995, 02:49:59 UTC
- Sich satellite series

Sich-1 was the first Ukrainian Earth observation satellite launched in August 1995 by Ukrainian Tsyklon-3 rocket from Plesetsk Cosmodrome in Russia. It operated until 2001. In this launch was also launched the first satellite of Chile, FASat-Alfa, that failed to detach from Sich-1. Both satellites, attached together, continue to orbit the Earth as of 2026.

== Mission goals ==
- Monitor vegetation, soil and bodies of water.
- Research electro-magnetic poles and electro-magnetic storms
- Research plasma in the ionosphere
- Study geological formations

== See also ==
- 1995 in spaceflight
