= Progress M-27 =

Russian cargo spacecraft

- A Progress-M spacecraft
- Mission type: Mir resupply
- COSPAR ID: 1995-020A
- SATCAT no.: 23555

Spacecraft properties
- Spacecraft: Progress (No.227)
- Spacecraft type: Progress-M
- Manufacturer: RKK Energia

Start of mission
- Launch date: 9 April 1995, 19:34:12 UTC
- Rocket: Soyuz-U
- Launch site: Baikonur, Site 1/5

End of mission
- Disposal: Deorbited
- Decay date: 23 May 1995, 03:27:12 UTC

Orbital parameters
- Reference system: Geocentric
- Regime: Low Earth
- Perigee altitude: 187 km
- Apogee altitude: 221 km
- Inclination: 51.7°
- Period: 88.6 minutes
- Epoch: 9 April 1995

Docking with Mir
- Docking port: Mir Core Module forward
- Docking date: 11 April 1995, 21:00:44 UTC
- Undocking date: 22 May 1995, 23:42:37 UTC

Progress M-27 (Russian: Прогресс M-27) was a Russian unmanned Progress cargo spacecraft, which was launched in April 1995 to resupply the Mir space station.

== Launch ==
Progress M-27 launched on 9 April 1995 from the Baikonur Cosmodrome in Kazakhstan. It used a Soyuz-U rocket.

== Docking ==
Progress M-27 docked with the forward port of the Mir Core Module on 11 April 1995 at 21:00:44 UTC, and was undocked on 22 May 1995 at 23:42:37 UTC.

== Decay ==
It remained in orbit until 23 May 1995, when it was deorbited. The deorbit burn occurred at 02:40:15 UTC and the mission ended at 03:27:52 UTC.

== See also ==
- 1995 in spaceflight
- List of Progress missions
- List of uncrewed spaceflights to Mir
