= Taurus Orion =

Taurus Orion is the designation of a two-stage sounding rocket, consisting of a Taurus starting stage and an Orion upper stage. The Taurus Orion has a ceiling of 200 km, a takeoff thrust of 457.00 kN, a takeoff weight of 2000 kg, a diameter of 0.58 m and a length of 11.40 m.
