= Norman Thagard =

American astronaut, scientist, and Marine Corps officer (born 1943)

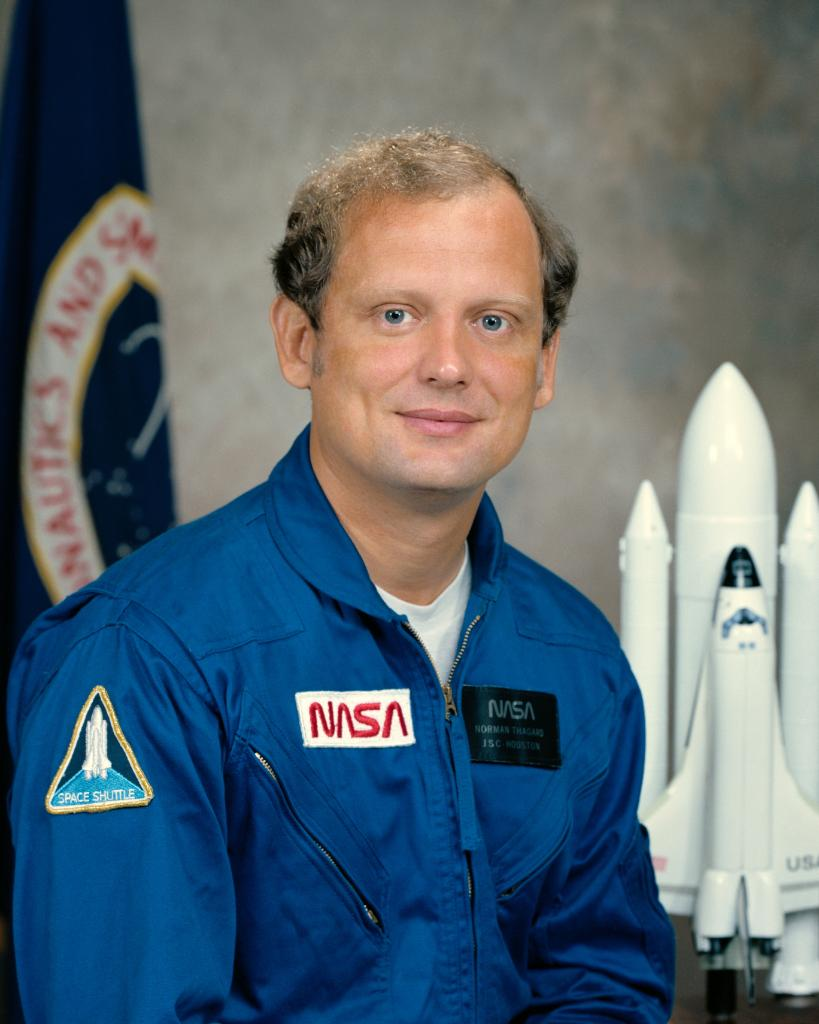
- Born: Norman Earl Thagard; July 3, 1943 (age 83); Marianna, Florida, U.S.
- Education: Florida State University (BS); University of Texas, Dallas (MD); University of Florida (MBA)
- Space career

NASA astronaut
- Rank: Captain, US Marine Corps
- Time in space: 140 days, 13 hours and 24 minutes
- Selection: NASA Group 8 (1978)
- Missions: STS-7; STS-51-B; STS-30; STS-42; Soyuz TM-21/STS-71 (Mir EO‑18)
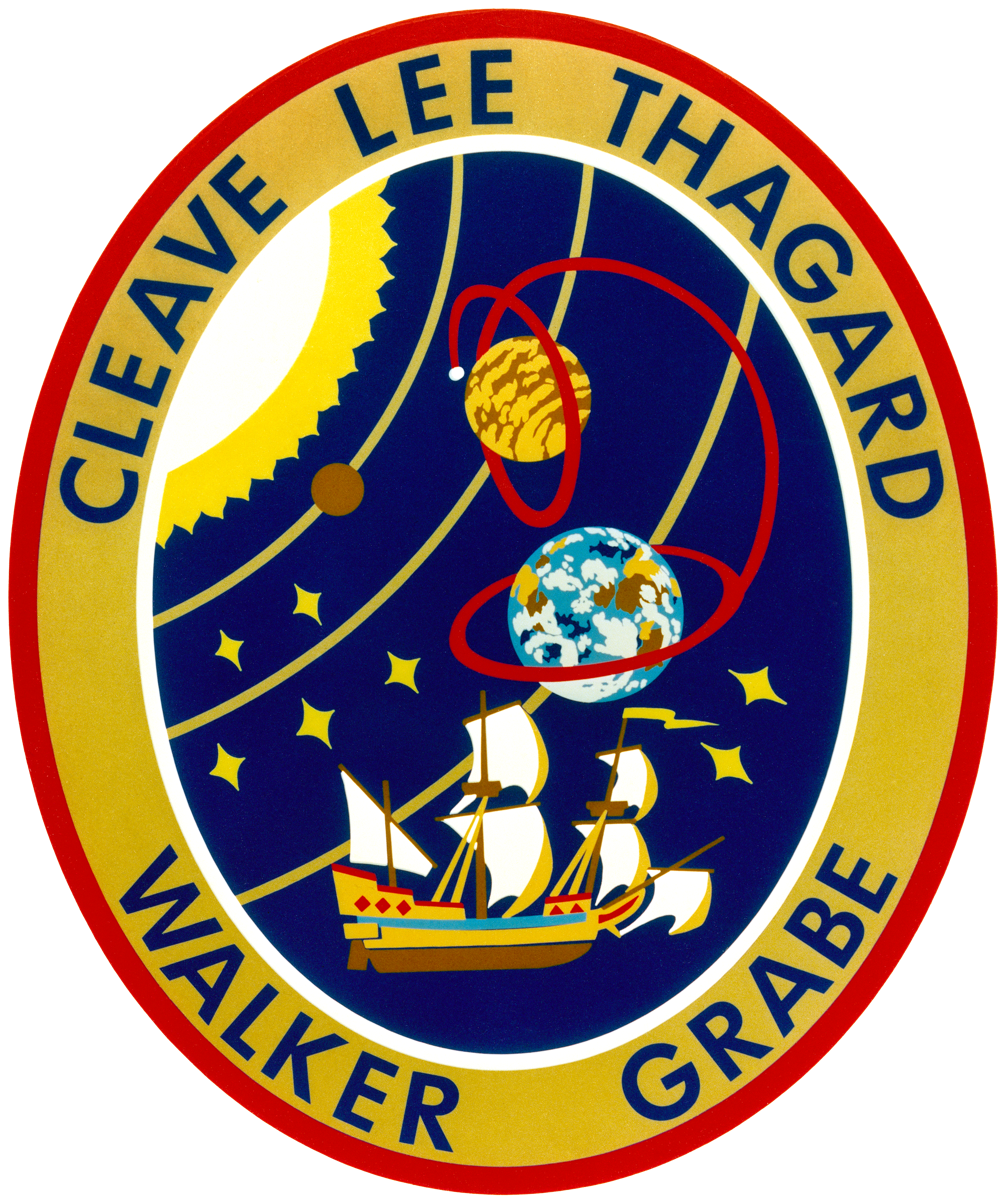
- Mission insignia
- Retired: January 3, 1996

Norman Earl Thagard (born July 3, 1943; Capt, USMC, Ret.) is an American scientist and former U.S. Marine Corps officer and naval aviator and NASA astronaut. He is a veteran of five space flights and on March 14, 1995, he became the first American to ride to space on board a Russian vehicle, the Soyuz TM-21 spacecraft for the Russian Mir-18 mission.

== Personal life ==
Thagard was born July 3, 1943, in Marianna, Florida, but considers Jacksonville, Florida, to be his hometown. He is married to Rex Kirby Johnson, formerly of South Ponte Vedra Beach, Florida. They have three sons. His father, Mr. James E. Thagard, and his mother, Mrs. Mary F. Key, are both deceased. During his free time, he enjoys classical music and electronic design. Thagard has published articles on digital and analog electronic design.

== Education and military service ==
Thagard earned a Bachelors and Masters Degrees in Engineering Science from Florida State University in Tallahassee by 1966.

In September 1966 he entered active duty with the United States Marine Corps Reserve. He achieved the rank of captain in 1967, was designated a Naval Aviator in 1968 and was subsequently assigned to duty flying F-4 Phantom IIs with VMFA-333 at Marine Corps Air Station Beaufort, South Carolina. He flew 163 combat missions in Vietnam while assigned to VMFA-115 from January 1969 to 1970. He returned to the United States and an assignment as aviation weapons division officer with VMFA-251 at the Marine Corps Air Station at Beaufort, South Carolina. He is a pilot and has logged more than 2,200 hours flying time, of which the majority was in jet aircraft.

Thagard resumed his academic studies in 1971, pursuing additional studies in Electrical Engineering and medicine. In 1977, he earned a Doctor of Medicine degree from the University of Texas Southwestern Medical School. Before joining NASA, he was interning in the Department of Internal Medicine at the Medical University of South Carolina. He is a licensed physician.

== NASA career ==
Thagard was selected as an astronaut candidate by NASA in January 1978. In August 1979, he completed a one-year training and evaluation period, making him eligible for assignment as a mission specialist on future Space Shuttle flights. A veteran of five space flights, he logged over 140 days in space. He was a mission specialist on STS-7 in 1983, STS-51-B in 1985, STS-30 in 1989, was the payload commander on STS-42 in 1992, and was the cosmonaut/researcher on the Russian Mir EO-18 mission in 1995, which saw him launch aboard Soyuz TM-21 (the first American to launch in a Soyuz) and land on STS-71.

Thagard first flew on the crew of STS-7, which launched from Kennedy Space Center, Florida, on June 18, 1983. This was the second flight for the Orbiter Challenger and the first mission with a crew of five. During the mission, the STS-7 crew deployed satellites for Canada (ANIK C-2) and Indonesia (Palapa B1); operated the Canadian-built Remote Manipulator System (RMS) to perform the first deployment and retrieval exercise with the Shuttle Pallet Satellite (SPAS-01); conducted the first formation flying of the Orbiter with a free-flying satellite (SPAS-01); carried and operated the first U.S./German cooperative materials science payload (OSTA-2); and operated the Continuous Flow Electrophoresis System (CFES) and the Monodisperse Latex Reactor (MLR) experiments, in addition to activating seven "Getaway Specials." During the flight, Thagard conducted various medical tests and collected data on physiological changes associated with astronaut adaptation to space. He also retrieved the rotating SPAS-01 using the RMS. Mission duration was 147 hours before landing at Edwards Air Force Base, California, on June 24, 1983.

Thagard then flew on STS-51-B, the Spacelab-3 science mission, which launched from Kennedy Space Center, Florida, on April 29, 1985, aboard Challenger. During the mission he served as flight engineer, sitting on the flight deck and assisting the commander and pilot during ascent and entry. Mission duration was 168 hours. Duties on orbit included satellite deployment operation with the NUSAT satellite as well as animal care for the 24 rats and two squirrel monkeys contained in the Research Animal Holding Facility (RAHF). Other duties were operation of the Geophysical Fluid Flow Cell (GFFC), Urinary Monitoring System (UMS) and the Ionization States of Solar and Galactic Cosmic Ray Heavy Nuclei (IONS) experiment. After 110 orbits of the Earth, Challenger landed at Edwards Air Force Base, California, on May 6, 1985.

He next served on the crew of STS-30, which launched from Kennedy Space Center, Florida, on May 4, 1989, aboard the Orbiter Atlantis. Thagard again served as flight engineer. During this four-day mission, crew members deployed the Magellan Venus-exploration spacecraft, the first U.S. planetary science mission launched since 1978, and the first planetary probe to be deployed from the Shuttle. Magellan arrived at Venus in mid-1990 and mapped the entire surface of Venus using specialized radar instruments. In addition, crew members also worked on secondary payloads involving fluid research in general, chemistry and electrical storm studies. Mission duration was 97 hours. Following 64 orbits of the Earth, the STS-30 mission concluded with a landing at Edwards Air Force Base, California, on May 8, 1989.

Thagard served as payload commander on STS-42, aboard the orbiter Discovery, which lifted off from the Kennedy Space Center, Florida, on January 22, 1992. Fifty five major experiments conducted in the International Microgravity Laboratory-1 module were provided by investigators from eleven countries, and represented a broad spectrum of scientific disciplines. During 128 orbits of the Earth, the STS-42 crew accomplished the mission's primary objective of investigating the effects of microgravity on materials processing and life sciences. In this unique laboratory in space, crew members worked around-the-clock in two shifts. Experiments investigated the microgravity effects on the growth of protein and semiconductor crystals. Biological experiments on the effects of zero gravity on plants, tissues, bacteria, insects and human vestibular response were also conducted. This eight-day mission culminated in a landing at Edwards Air Force Base, California, on January 30, 1992.

On his last mission, Thagard was a crew member for the Russian Mir EO-18 mission. Twenty-eight experiments were conducted in the course of the 115-day flight. The crew lifted off from the Baikonur Cosmodrome in Kazakhstan aboard Soyuz TM-21 on March 14, 1995. The mission culminated in a landing at the Kennedy Space Center on the Space Shuttle Atlantis flight STS-71 on July 7, 1995.

== Post-NASA career ==
Thagard retired from NASA in December 1995 and joined the faculty of Florida State University at Tallahassee. He became a tenured professor and associate dean for college relations in the FAMU - FSU College of Engineering.

In 1996, at the request of the Smithsonian Institution, Thagard's Russian "SOKOL" space suit was donated to the National Air & Space Museum Norman Thagard also served as an aerospace consultant and was technical advisor for Virus, a 1999 film starring Jamie Lee Curtis and Donald Sutherland, and for Armageddon (1998) starring Bruce Willis, Ben Affleck, and Liv Tyler.

In 1998, Norm Thagard was appointed to the Board of Directors of EMS Technologies, Inc. EMS is an Atlanta-based communications company.

In 2003, Thagard co-founded the Challenger Learning Center of Tallahassee, with shuttle/mission control/space station simulators, digital space theater/planetarium and IMAX theater. Thagard's interest in part was driven by his close friendship with the family of Challenger astronaut Dick Scobee. He also serves as an advisor for Space Adventures, Ltd., a company offering aerospace experiences, including orbital flight.

In 2009, Thagard was elected Fellow of the American Institute of Aeronautics and Astronautics. He was also a member of the Editorial Review Board of the Journal of the Society for Human Performance in Extreme Environments.

== Organizations ==
- American Institute of Aeronautics and Astronautics
- Aerospace Medical Association
- Phi Kappa Phi
- Tallahassee Symphony Orchestra

== Awards and honors ==
=== Community recognition ===
- Cecil Spaceport Mission Control Center named after Dr. Norman Thagard (2021)
- Inducted into the U.S. Astronaut Hall of Fame (2004)
- Designated Honorary Conch and Citizen of the Florida Keys (2000)
- A small portion of Jacksonville, Florida's 5th Street, in front of his alma mater, Paxon High School, renamed "Norman E. Thagard" Blvd (1998)
- Recipient of Russia's Order of Friendship, presented personally by Russian Federation President Boris Yeltsin (1996)
- Named as one of NASA's 15 "Superstars of Space Flight" (1996)
- Inducted into New Mexico's International Space Hall of Fame (1996)
- Florida State House and Senate Commendation Resolutions (1996)
- City of Tallahassee Commendation Proclamation (1995 and 2004)

=== Academic and alumni recognition ===
- Erskine Visiting Fellow, University of Canterbury, Christchurch, New Zealand (2001)
- The Society of NASA Flight Surgeons' 1997 W. Randolph Lovelace Award
- Admitted to FSU's Circle of Gold Honorary Society (1998)
- Honorary Doctorate Degree, Florida Atlantic University (1996)
- Henry G. Armstrong Lecturer in Aerospace Medicine (1996)
- American Institute of Aeronautics and Astronautics' 1996 Jeffries Medical Research Award
- Aerospace Medical Association's 1996 Hubertus Strughold Award for Space Medicine
- American Astronautical Society's 1983 and 1995 Melbourne W. Boynton Award
- Florida State University's "Grad Made Good" Award (1983) and Wescott Medal (1995)
- Florida State University's student health center designated the "Thagard Student Health Center" by legislative act (1986)

=== NASA awards ===
As a veteran of five (5) space flights, he is the recipient of the NASA Space Flight Medal for each flight. He was awarded the NASA Distinguished Service Medal and the NASA Sustained Superior Performance Award twice.

=== Military commendations ===
Thagard served as a U.S. Marine and aviator for four years. He received eleven (11) Air Medals, the Navy Commendation Medal with Combat "V", the Marine Corps "E" Award, the Vietnam Service Medal, and the Vietnamese Cross of Gallantry with Palm. In 1992, he was designated by the Commandant of the Marine Corps an honorary Naval Astronaut Pilot.
