= Volunteers in Technical Assistance =

American development nonprofit

Volunteers in Technical Assistance (VITA) was an American nonprofit organization that provided technical assistance for international development. It emerged in 1959 from a group of scientists and engineers linked to General Electric. VITA became an early organization associated with appropriate technology.

== History ==
VITA developed from discussions among scientists and engineers at General Electric in Schenectady, New York. Some also taught at Rensselaer Polytechnic Institute. The group began receiving requests for technical advice from charities. The United States Agency for International Development contracted it to study solar cookers in 1960.

VITA later expanded outside the United States. It had affiliated groups in several countries by 1968. In 1969, the Office of Economic Opportunity commissioned VITA to undertake work in the United States.

== Activities ==
VITA maintained a roster of volunteers used by more than 120 private relief organizations by 1991. These included CARE, the Red Cross, Catholic Relief Services and Save the Children. VITA also used computer networks to distribute technical information. The Washington Post in 1993 reported that the organization used the Internet in its work. It advised countries on subjects such as crop production and water facilities.

The organization also worked on projects linking development with environmental conservation. The Christian Science Monitor in 1995 reported on VITA's work near the Perinet nature reserve in Madagascar. VITA trained local guides for ecotourism. It also oversaw a program that directed part of national park revenue to village projects.

== Merger ==
VITA in 2005 joined with EnterpriseWorks Worldwide. The combined organization became known as EnterpriseWorks/VITA. EnterpriseWorks/VITA later merged with Relief International in 2009.
