= FASat-Alfa =

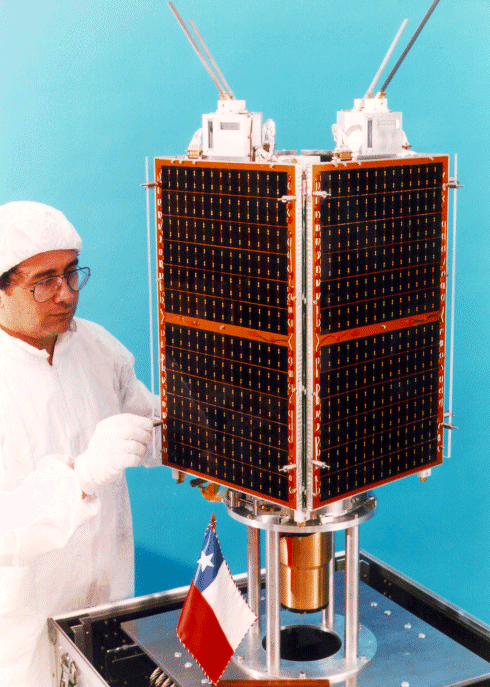
FASat-Alfa

FASat-Alfa was to become the first Chilean satellite, and was constructed under a Technology Transfer Program between the Chilean Air Force (FACH) and Surrey Satellite Technology Ltd (SSTL) of the United Kingdom. The primary goal of the Program was to obtain for Chile the basic scientific and technological experience required to continue with more advanced steps. The purposes of the FASat-Alfa mission were to create a group of engineers with aerospace experience, to have the first Chilean satellite in orbit, and to install and operate the Mission Control Station (ECM-Santiago) in Chile.

There were two satellites: FASat-Alfa and FASat-Bravo. The Alfa satellite was launched on 31 August 1995 on TSYCLON from Plesetsk. Its orbit was intended to be 682 x 651 km, inclined at 82.53 degrees; however, the spacecraft failed to separate from the Ukrainian satellite Sich-1 it was attached to.

The Bravo satellite was launched on 10 July 1998, on TSYCLON from Baikonur. Its intended orbit was 682 x 651 km, inclined at 82.53 degrees. It was to operate 13,000 orbits until 2002.

== Characteristics ==
- Bus: SSTL microbus, fifth generation
- Owner: Fuerza Aérea De Chile (Air Force), Chile
- Payloads: Ozone Monitoring Experiment, Remote sensing, Data Transfer Experiment, Advanced Digital Signal Processing Payload, Orbital Positioning via GPS, Educational support
