= Progress M-28 =

Russian cargo spacecraft

- A Progress-M spacecraft
- Mission type: Mir resupply
- COSPAR ID: 1995-036A
- SATCAT no.: 23617

Spacecraft properties
- Spacecraft: Progress (No.228)
- Spacecraft type: Progress-M
- Manufacturer: RKK Energia

Start of mission
- Launch date: 20 July 1995, 03:04:41 UTC
- Rocket: Soyuz-U
- Launch site: Baikonur, Site 1/5

End of mission
- Disposal: Deorbited
- Decay date: 4 September 1995, 08:58:55 UTC

Orbital parameters
- Reference system: Geocentric
- Regime: Low Earth
- Perigee altitude: 191 km
- Apogee altitude: 239 km
- Inclination: 51.6°
- Period: 88.5 minutes
- Epoch: 20 July 1995

Docking with Mir
- Docking port: Mir Core Module forward
- Docking date: 22 July 1995, 05:39:37 UTC
- Undocking date: 4 September 1995, 05:09:53 UTC

Progress M-28 (Russian: Прогресс M-28) was a Russian unmanned Progress cargo spacecraft, which was launched in July 1995 to resupply the Mir space station.

== Launch ==
Progress M-28 launched on 20 July 1995 from the Baikonur Cosmodrome in Kazakhstan. It used a Soyuz-U rocket.

== Docking ==
Progress M-28 docked with the forward port of the Mir Core Module on 22 July 1995 at 05:39:37 UTC, and was undocked on 4 September 1995 at 05:09:53 UTC.

== Decay ==
It remained in orbit until 4 September 1995, when it was deorbited. The mission ended at 08:58:55 UTC.

== See also ==
- 1995 in spaceflight
- List of Progress missions
- List of uncrewed spaceflights to Mir
