= Progress M-40 =

Russian cargo spacecraft

- A Progress-M spacecraft
- Mission type: Mir resupply
- COSPAR ID: 1998-062A
- SATCAT no.: 25512

Spacecraft properties
- Spacecraft: Progress (No.239)
- Spacecraft type: Progress-M
- Manufacturer: RKK Energia

Start of mission
- Launch date: 25 October 1998, 04:14:57 UTC
- Rocket: Soyuz-U
- Launch site: Baikonur, Site 1/5

End of mission
- Disposal: Deorbited
- Decay date: 5 February 1999, 10:16:05 UTC

Orbital parameters
- Reference system: Geocentric
- Regime: Low Earth
- Perigee altitude: 194 km
- Apogee altitude: 238 km
- Inclination: 51.6°
- Period: 88.6 minutes
- Epoch: 25 October 1998

Docking with Mir
- Docking port: Kvant-1 aft
- Docking date: 27 October 1998, 05:34:41 UTC
- Undocking date: 4 February 1999, 09:59:32 UTC

Progress M-40 (Russian: Прогресс M-40) was a Russian unmanned Progress cargo spacecraft, which was launched in October 1998 to resupply the Mir space station, carry the Sputnik 41 satellite and the unsuccessful Znamya 2.5 solar mirror.

== Launch ==
Progress M-40 launched on 25 October 1998 from the Baikonur Cosmodrome in Kazakhstan. It used a Soyuz-U rocket.

== Docking ==
Progress M-40 docked with the aft port of the Kvant-1 module of Mir on 27 October 1998 at 05:34:41 UTC, and was undocked on 4 February 1999 at 09:59:32 UTC. On 4 February 1999 at 10:24 UTC, following undocking from Mir, an unsuccessful attempt was made to deploy Znamya 2.5, a solar mirror.

== Decay ==
It remained in orbit until 5 February 1999, when it was deorbited. The deorbit burn occurred at 10:16:05 UTC, with the mission ending at 11:09:30 UTC.

== See also ==
- 1998 in spaceflight
- List of Progress missions
- List of uncrewed spaceflights to Mir
