= Jay A. Schwarz =

American government official

Chief of the Space Bureau, Federal Communications Commission
- In office February 4, 2025 – August 2026
- Appointed by: Brendan Carr
- Preceded by: Julie Kearney
- Succeeded by: Jennifer Gilsenan (acting)

Personal details
- Born: Jay Alan Schwarz
- Education: Texas A&M University (BS, MEng); University of Pittsburgh (PhD)

Jay Alan Schwarz is an American government official who served as Chief of the Federal Communications Commission's (FCC) Space Bureau from February 2025 to August 2026. He was appointed by FCC chairman Brendan Carr, succeeding Julie Kearney as the second person to lead the bureau since its creation in 2023. Schwarz previously worked at the FCC as an advisor to then-chairman Ajit Pai.

== Career ==
=== Education ===
Schwarz earned a bachelor's degree in civil engineering from Texas A&M University in 2004, and a Master of Engineering in civil engineering the following year. He earned a doctorate in economics from the University of Pittsburgh in 2011.

=== Early FCC career and Comcast ===
In his first tenure at the FCC, Schwarz worked as an economist within the Wireline Competition Bureau and the Wireless Telecommunications Bureau. He held a post in the agency's Office of Strategic Planning, before becoming Wireline Advisor to then-Chairman Ajit Pai. He then left the agency for the private sector, working for six years as Comcast's vice president of public policy, working on broadband regulation.

=== Space Bureau (2025–2026) ===
On February 4, 2025, newly installed FCC Chairman Brendan Carr announced Schwarz's appointment as Chief of the Space Bureau, part of a broader round of leadership appointments that also included Adam Candeub as general counsel. He succeeded Julie Kearney, who had led the bureau since its creation in April 2023, when the FCC split its former International Bureau into the Space Bureau and a separate Office of International Affairs. As chief, Schwarz oversaw a 45-person staff of attorneys, engineers, and other technical specialists, and advised the FCC chairman and commissioners on space-related matters.

Schwarz pursued a policy of deregulation centered on satellite licensing and spectrum allocation policy. At the 2025 Space Symposium, he described the bureau's existing licensing approach as a "gatekeeper system" suited to an earlier stage of the industry, and said the agency intended to shift toward a general presumption in favor of approving new systems. In a September 2025 keynote at the Technology Policy Research Conference, he described the current pace of satellite deployment as a "space industrial revolution" and argued that space regulation needed to keep moving from a risk-focused posture toward one oriented around capturing new opportunities.

A significant initiative during Schwarz's tenure was the FCC's April 2026 overhaul of its satellite spectrum-sharing rules, which replaced the decades-old equivalent power flux density (EPFD) framework governing interference protections between non-geostationary (NGSO) satellite systems and geostationary (GSO) operators. The change was sought by NGSO operators such as SpaceX, which argued that the existing limits, largely unrevised since the 1990s, constrained the capacity of newer low Earth orbit systems, while geostationary satellite providers including Viasat, SES, and DirecTV warned that relaxed limits could cause interference with their fleets. The FCC adopted the new framework in a unanimous vote on April 30, 2026. Schwarz's bureau also reviewed EchoStar's 2026 sale of satellite spectrum licenses to SpaceX and AT&T, a $42.6 billion transaction the FCC subsequently approved. On July 9, 2026, he wrote on behalf of the FCC to license the Eärendil-1 space mirror by Reflect Orbital.

A central element of Schwarz's tenure at the Space Bureau was the FCC's adoption of a new Part 100 licensing framework, which replaced the decades-old Part 25 rules governing satellite and earth-station licensing. The order was designed to standardize and hasten the review of applications for space and earth stations, including through modular filings and conditional grants, and was adopted by the Commission on July 22, 2026. Carr credited Schwarz and Space Bureau staff with reducing the agency's satellite-licensing backlog by 43 percent in 2025 and by a further 15 percent in 2026.

On August 7, 2026, the FCC announced that Schwarz would depart as Space Bureau chief later that month, with Deputy Bureau Chief Jennifer Gilsenan taking over as acting chief during the transition.

=== Post-FCC career ===
Following his departure from the Space Bureau, Schwarz founded Stratum Policy, a policy consultancy, of which he is founder and principal.
