= Space mirror (disambiguation) =

Can refer to:

- Znamya, an orbital space mirror
- Space mirror, as used in solar radiation modification
- Space Mirror Memorial, an astronaut memorial at the Kennedy Space Center
