= 1992 in spaceflight =

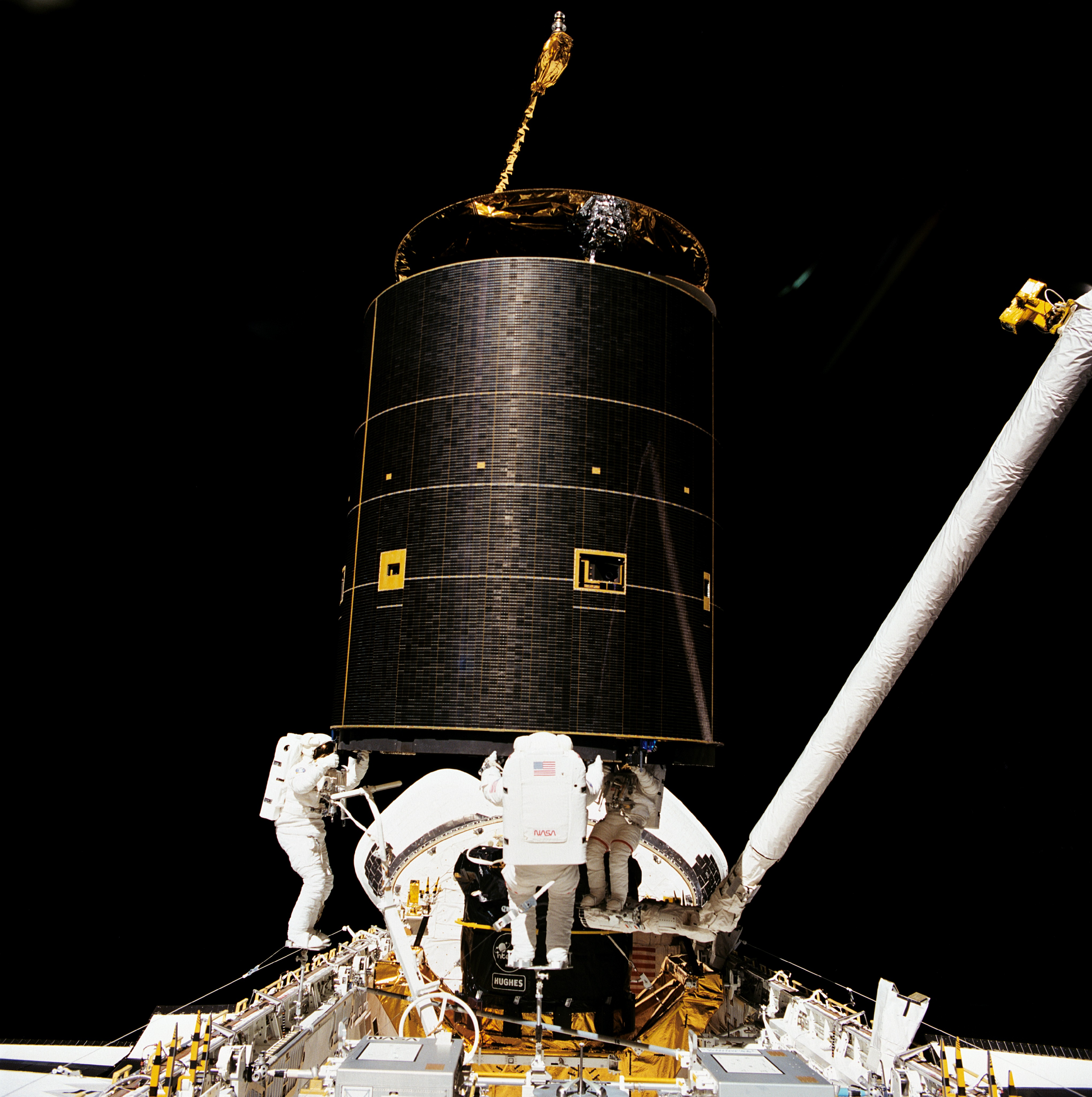
- Richard Hieb, Thomas Akers, and Pierre J. Thuot undertake the first-ever three-person EVA to repair the Intelsat 603 spacecraft during STS-49, the maiden flight of the Space Shuttle Endeavour.

Orbital launches
- First: 21 January
- Last: 29 December
- Total: 97
- Successes: 93
- Failures: 2
- Partial failures: 2

National firsts
- Satellite: South Korea
- Orbital launch: Russia
- Space traveller: Belgium; Italy; Switzerland

Rockets
- Maiden flights: Atlas IIA; Space Shuttle Endeavour
- Retirements: Commercial Titan III; Delta II 6920; Delta II 6925; H-I

Crewed flights
- Orbital: 10
- Total travellers: 59

1992 in spaceflight

The following is an outline of 1992 in spaceflight.

== Orbital launches ==
- ← Jan
- Feb
- Mar
- Apr
- May
- Jun
- Jul
- Aug
- Sep
- Oct
- Nov
- Dec →

Date and time (UTC)	Rocket	Flight number	Launch site		LSP	
Date and time (UTC)	Payload (⚀ = CubeSat)	Operator	Orbit	Function	Decay (UTC)	Outcome
Date and time (UTC)	Remarks					
=== January ===
21 January; 15:00	(Russia) Soyuz-U		(Russia) Plesetsk Site 43/3		(Russia) VKS	
21 January; 15:00	(Russia) Kosmos 2175 (Yantar-4K2)	VKS	Low Earth	Reconnaissance	20 March	Successful
21 January; 15:00	First Russian (post Soviet) satellite launch					
22 January; 14:52:33	(United States) Space Shuttle Discovery		(United States) Kennedy LC-39A		(United States) United Space Alliance	
22 January; 14:52:33	(United States) STS-42	NASA	Low Earth	Microgravity	30 January; 16:07:17	Successful
22 January; 14:52:33	(United States) Spacelab Long Module 2	ESA/NASA	Low Earth (Discovery)	Spacelab IML-1	30 January; 16:07:17	Successful
22 January; 14:52:33	Crewed orbital flight with seven astronauts					
24 January; 01:18:01	(Russia) Molniya-M/2BL		(Russia) Plesetsk Site 43/3		(Russia) VKS	
24 January; 01:18:01	(Russia) Kosmos 2176 (Oko)	VKS	Molniya	Missile defence	17 January 2012	Successful
25 January; 07:50:17	(Russia) Soyuz-U2		(Kazakhstan) Baikonur Site 1/5		(Russia) VKS	
25 January; 07:50:17	(Russia) Progress M-11	Roskosmos	Low Earth (Mir)	Logistics	13 March	Successful
29 January; 22:19:12	(Russia) Proton-K/DM-2		(Kazakhstan) Baikonur Site 81/23		(Russia) VKS	
29 January; 22:19:12	(Russia) Kosmos 2177 (GLONASS)	VKS	Medium Earth	Navigation	In orbit	Successful
29 January; 22:19:12	(Russia) Kosmos 2178 (GLONASS)	VKS	Medium Earth	Navigation	In orbit	Successful
29 January; 22:19:12	(Russia) Kosmos 2179 (GLONASS)	VKS	Medium Earth	Navigation	In orbit	Successful
=== February ===
5 February	(Ukraine) Zenit-2		(Kazakhstan) Baikonur Site 45/1		(Russia) VKS	
5 February	(Russia) Tselina-2 #10	MO RF	Intended: Low Earth	ELINT	5 February	Launch failure
5 February	Second stage overheated, causing malfunction					
11 February; 00:41:02	(United States) Atlas II		(United States) Cape Canaveral LC-36A		(United States) General Dynamics	
11 February; 00:41:02	(United States) USA-78 (DSCS IIIB-14)	US Air Force	Geostationary	Communications	In orbit	Operational
11 February; 01:50	(Japan) H-I		(Japan) Tanegashima LA-N		(Japan) NASDA	
11 February; 01:50	(Japan) JERS-1	NASDA	Sun-synchronous	Earth observation	3 December 2001	Successful
11 February; 01:50	Final flight of H-I					
17 February; 22:05:08	(Russia) Kosmos-3M		(Russia) Plesetsk Site 133/3		(Russia) VKS	
17 February; 22:05:08	(Russia) Kosmos 2180 (Parus)	MO RF	Low Earth	Navigation	In orbit	Successful
23 February; 22:29	(United States) Delta II 7925		(United States) Cape Canaveral LC-17B		(United States) McDonnell Douglas	
23 February; 22:29	(United States) USA-79 (GPS IIA-3)	US Air Force	Medium Earth	Navigation	In orbit	Operational
26 February; 23:58:10	(France) Ariane 4 44L		(France) Kourou ELA-2		(France) Arianespace	
26 February; 23:58:10	(Japan) Superbird-B1	SCC	Geostationary	Communications	In orbit	Operational
26 February; 23:58:10	(Saudi Arabia) Arabsat-1C	ARABSAT	Current: Graveyard; Operational: Geostationary	Communications	In orbit	Successful
26 February; 23:58:10	Arabsat sold to ISRO in November 1997 and operated until October 2004 as INSAT-2DT					
=== March ===
4 March; 04:27	(Russia) Molniya-M/ML		(Russia) Plesetsk Site 43/4		(Russia) VKS	
4 March; 04:27	(Russia) Molniya-1 #83	MOM	Molniya	Communications	1 July 2007	Successful
9 March; 22:35:59	(Russia) Kosmos-3M		(Russia) Plesetsk Site 132/1		(Russia) VKS	
9 March; 22:35:59	(Russia) Kosmos 2181 (Tsikada)	MO RF	Low Earth	Navigation	In orbit	Successful
14 March; 00:00	(United States) Atlas I		(United States) Cape Canaveral LC-36B		(United States) General Dynamics	
14 March; 00:00	(United States) Galaxy 5	Hughes	Geosynchronous	Communications	In orbit	Operational
17 March; 10:54:30	(Russia) Soyuz-U2		(Kazakhstan) Baikonur Site 1/5		(Russia) VKS	
17 March; 10:54:30	(Russia) Soyuz TM-14	Roskosmos	Low Earth (Mir)	Mir EO-11	10 August	Successful
17 March; 10:54:30	Crewed orbital flight with three cosmonauts; First crewed Russian (post-Soviet) launch					
24 March; 13:13:39	(United States) Space Shuttle Atlantis		(United States) Kennedy LC-39A		(United States) United Space Alliance	
24 March; 13:13:39	(United States) STS-45	NASA	Low Earth	Microgravity	2 April	Successful
24 March; 13:13:39	(United States) Spacelab Double Pallet	NASA	Low Earth (Atlantis)	Spacelab ATLAS-1	2 April	Successful
24 March; 13:13:39	Crewed orbital flight with seven astronauts including the first Belgian in space					
=== April ===
1 April; 14:18	(Russia) Soyuz-U		(Russia) Plesetsk Site 16/2		(Russia) VKS	
1 April; 14:18	(Russia) Kosmos 2182 (Yantar-4K2)	MO RF	Low Earth	Reconnaissance	30 May	Successful
2 April; 01:50	(Russia) Proton-K/DM-2		(Kazakhstan) Baikonur Site 81/23		(Russia) VKS	
2 April; 01:50	(Russia) Gorizont 25	YeSSS	Geostationary	Communications	In orbit	Successful
8 April; 12:20	(Russia) Soyuz-U		(Kazakhstan) Baikonur Site 31/6		(Russia) VKS	
8 April; 12:20	(Russia) Kosmos 2183 (Yantar-4K2)	MO RF	Low Earth	Reconnaissance	16 February 1993	Successful
10 April; 03:20	(United States) Delta II 7925		(United States) Cape Canaveral LC-17B		(United States) McDonnell Douglas	
10 April; 03:20	(United States) USA-80 (GPS IIA-4)	US Air Force	Medium Earth	Navigation	In orbit	Successful
15 April; 07:17:43	(Russia) Kosmos-3M		(Russia) Plesetsk Site 132/1		(Russia) VKS	
15 April; 07:17:43	(Russia) Kosmos 2184 (Parus)	MO RF	Low Earth	Navigation	In orbit	Successful
15 April; 23:25:27	(France) Ariane 4 44L		(France) Kourou ELA-2		(France) Arianespace	
15 April; 23:25:27	(United Kingdom) Inmarsat-2F4	Inmarsat	Geostationary	Communications	In orbit	Operational
15 April; 23:25:27	(France) Télécom 2B	France Télécom	Geostationary	Communications	In orbit	Operational
19 April; 21:29:25	(Russia) Soyuz-U2		(Kazakhstan) Baikonur Site 1/5		(Russia) VKS	
19 April; 21:29:25	(Russia) Progress M-12	Roskosmos	Low Earth (Mir)	Logistics	27 June	Successful
25 April; 08:53	(United States) Titan 23G		(United States) Vandenberg SLC-4W		(United States) US Air Force	
25 April; 08:53	(United States) USA-81 (Bernie/Singleton)	NRO	Low Earth (Polar)	ELINT	In orbit	Operational
29 April; 09:00	(Russia) Soyuz-U		(Russia) Plesetsk Site 43/4		(Russia) VKS	
29 April; 09:00	(Russia) Resurs-F #14	MO RF	Low Earth	Remote sensing	29 May	Successful
29 April; 10:10	(Russia) Soyuz-U		(Kazakhstan) Baikonur Site 1/5		(Russia) VKS	
29 April; 10:10	(Russia) Kosmos 2185 (Yantar-1KFT)	MO RF	Low Earth	Reconnaissance	11 June	Successful
=== May ===
7 May; 23:40	(United States) Space Shuttle Endeavour		(United States) Kennedy LC-39B		(United States) United Space Alliance	
7 May; 23:40	(United States) STS-49	NASA	Low Earth	Satellite reboost	16 May	Successful
7 May; 23:40	Crewed orbital flight with seven astronauts; Maiden flight of Space Shuttle Endeavour; reboosted Intelsat 603					
14 May; 00:40	(United States) Delta II 7925-8		(United States) Cape Canaveral LC-17B		(United States) McDonnell Douglas	
14 May; 00:40	(Indonesia) Palapa-B4	Telkom	Geostationary	Communications	In orbit	Successful
20 May; 00:30	(India) ASLV		(India) Sriharikota FLP		(India) ISRO	
20 May; 00:30	(India) SROSS-C	ISRO	Low Earth	Magnetosphere	14 July	Partial failure
20 May; 00:30	Placed into incorrect orbit due to fifth stage spin-up failure					
28 May; 19:09:59	(Russia) Soyuz-U		(Russia) Plesetsk Site 16/2		(Russia) VKS	
28 May; 19:09:59	(Russia) Kosmos 2186 (Yantar-4K2)	MO RF	Low Earth	Reconnaissance	24 July	Successful
=== June ===
3 June; 00:50:30	(Russia) Kosmos-3M		(Russia) Plesetsk Site 133/3		(Russia) VKS	
3 June; 00:50:30	(Russia) Kosmos 2187 (Strela-1M)	MO RF	Low Earth	Communications	In orbit	Successful
3 June; 00:50:30	(Russia) Kosmos 2188 (Strela-1M)	MO RF	Low Earth	Communications	In orbit	Successful
3 June; 00:50:30	(Russia) Kosmos 2189 (Strela-1M)	MO RF	Low Earth	Communications	In orbit	Successful
3 June; 00:50:30	(Russia) Kosmos 2190 (Strela-1M)	MO RF	Low Earth	Communications	In orbit	Successful
3 June; 00:50:30	(Russia) Kosmos 2191 (Strela 1M)	MO RF	Low Earth	Communications	In orbit	Successful
3 June; 00:50:30	(Russia) Kosmos 2192 (Strela-1M)	MO RF	Low Earth	Communications	In orbit	Successful
3 June; 00:50:30	(Russia) Kosmos 2193 (Strela-1M)	MO RF	Low Earth	Communications	In orbit	Successful
3 June; 00:50:30	(Russia) Kosmos 2194 (Strela-1M)	MO RF	Low Earth	Communications	In orbit	Successful
7 June; 16:40	(United States) Delta II 6920-10		(United States) Cape Canaveral LC-17A		(United States) McDonnell Douglas	
7 June; 16:40	(United States) EUVE	NASA	Low Earth	Ultraviolet astronomy	31 January 2002	Successful
7 June; 16:40	Final flight of Delta II 6920					
10 June; 00:00	(United States) Atlas IIA		(United States) Cape Canaveral LC-36B		(United States) General Dynamics	
10 June; 00:00	(United Nations) Intelsat K	Intelsat	Geostationary	Communications	In orbit	Successful
10 June; 00:00	Maiden flight of Atlas IIA					
23 June; 08:00	(Russia) Soyuz-U		(Russia) Plesetsk Site 43/3		(Russia) VKS	
23 June; 08:00	(Russia) Resurs-F #15	MO RF	Low Earth	Remote sensing	9 July	Successful
25 June; 16:12:22	(United States) Space Shuttle Columbia		(United States) Kennedy LC-39A		(United States) United Space Alliance	
25 June; 16:12:22	(United States) STS-50	NASA	Low Earth	Microgravity	9 July	Successful
25 June; 16:12:22	(United States) Spacelab Long Module 1	NASA	Low Earth (Columbia)	Spacelab USML-1	9 July	Successful
25 June; 16:12:22	(United States) EDO Pallet	NASA	Low Earth (Columbia)	Cryogenic mission extension pallet	9 July	Successful
25 June; 16:12:22	Crewed orbital flight with seven astronauts; Maiden flight of EDO Pallet					
30 June; 16:43:13	(Russia) Soyuz-U2		(Kazakhstan) Baikonur Site 31/6		(Russia) VKS	
30 June; 16:43:13	(Russia) Progress M-13	Roskosmos	Low Earth (Mir)	Logistics	24 July	Successful
=== July ===
1 July; 20:16:22	(Russia) Kosmos-3M		(Russia) Plesetsk Site 133/3		(Russia) VKS	
1 July; 20:16:22	(Russia) Kosmos 2195 (Parus)	MO RF	Low Earth	Navigation	In orbit	Successful
2 July; 21:54:01	(United States) Atlas II/IABS		(United States) Cape Canaveral LC-36A		(United States) General Dynamics	
2 July; 21:54:01	(United States) USA-82 (DSCS IIIB-12)	US Air Force	Geostationary	Communications	In orbit	Operational
3 July; 14:19	(United States) Scout G-1		(United States) Vandenberg SLC-5		(United States) NASA	
3 July; 14:19	(United States) SAMPEX (SMEX-1/Explorer 68)	NASA	Low Earth	Solar	13 November 2012	Successful
7 July; 09:20:01	(United States) Delta II 7925		(United States) Cape Canaveral LC-17B		(United States) McDonnell Douglas	
7 July; 09:20:01	(United States) USA-83 (GPS IIA-5)	US Air Force	Medium Earth	Navigation	In orbit	Operational
8 July; 09:53:14	(Russia) Molniya-M/2BL		(Russia) Plesetsk Site 43/3		(Russia) VKS	
8 July; 09:53:14	(Russia) Kosmos 2196 (Oko)	MO RF	Molniya	Missile defence	In orbit	Successful
9 July; 22:42:19	(France) Ariane 4 44L		(France) Kourou ELA-2		(France) Arianespace	
9 July; 22:42:19	(India) INSAT-2A	ISRO	Geostationary	Communications	In orbit	Successful
9 July; 22:42:19	(France) Eutelsat 2F4	Eutelsat	Geostationary	Communications	In orbit	Successful
9 July; 22:42:19	Eutelsat retired in 2003					
13 July; 17:41:40	(Ukraine) Tsyklon-3		(Russia) Plesetsk		(Russia) VKS	
13 July; 17:41:40	(Russia) Kosmos 2197 (Strela-3)	MO RF	Low Earth	Communications	In orbit	Successful
13 July; 17:41:40	(Russia) Kosmos 2198 (Strela-3)	MO RF	Low Earth	Communications	In orbit	Successful
13 July; 17:41:40	(Russia) Kosmos 2199 (Gonets-D)	Roskosmos	Low Earth	Communications	In orbit	Successful
13 July; 17:41:40	(Russia) Kosmos 2200 (Strela-3)	MO RF	Low Earth	Communications	In orbit	Successful
13 July; 17:41:40	(Russia) Kosmos 2201 (Gonets-D)	Roskosmos	Low Earth	Communications	In orbit	Successful
13 July; 17:41:40	(Russia) Kosmos 2202 (Strela-3)	MO RF	Low Earth	Communications	In orbit	Successful
14 July; 22:02	(Russia) Proton-K/DM-2		(Kazakhstan) Baikonur Site 81/23		(Russia) VKS	
14 July; 22:02	(Russia) Gorizont 26	YeSSS	Geostationary	Communications	In orbit	Successful
24 July; 14:26	(United States) Delta II 6925		(United States) Cape Canaveral LC-17A		(United States) McDonnell Douglas	
24 July; 14:26	(Japan) (United States) GEOTAIL	ISAS/NASA	High Earth	Magnetosphere	In orbit	Successful
24 July; 14:26	(United States) DUVE	NASA/California	Low Earth	Ultraviolet astronomy	16 March 2003	Successful
24 July; 14:26	Final flight of Delta II 6000-series					
24 July; 19:40	(Russia) Soyuz-U		(Russia) Plesetsk Site 43/3		(Russia) VKS	
24 July; 19:40	(Russia) Kosmos 2203 (Yantar-4K2)	MO RF	Low Earth	Reconnaissance	22 September	Successful
27 July; 06:08:42	(Russia) Soyuz-U2		(Kazakhstan) Baikonur Site 1/5		(Russia) VKS	
27 July; 06:08:42	(Russia) Soyuz TM-15	Roskosmos	Low Earth (Mir)	Mir EO-12	1 February 1993	Successful
27 July; 06:08:42	Crewed orbital flight with three cosmonauts					
30 July; 01:59:01	(Russia) Proton-K/DM-2		(Kazakhstan) Baikonur Site 81/23		(Russia) VKS	
30 July; 01:59:01	(Russia) Kosmos 2204 (GLONASS)	VKS	Medium Earth	Navigation	In orbit	Successful
30 July; 01:59:01	(Russia) Kosmos 2205 (GLONASS)	VKS	Medium Earth	Navigation	In orbit	Successful
30 July; 01:59:01	(Russia) Kosmos 2206 (GLONASS)	VKS	Medium Earth	Navigation	In orbit	Successful
30 July; 11:00	(Russia) Soyuz-U		(Russia) Plesetsk Site 43/4		(Russia) VKS	
30 July; 11:00	(Russia) Kosmos 2207 (Zenit-8)	MO RF	Low Earth	Reconnaissance	13 August	Successful
31 July; 13:56:48	(United States) Space Shuttle Atlantis		(United States) Kennedy LC-39B		(United States) United Space Alliance	
31 July; 13:56:48	(United States) STS-46	NASA	Low Earth	Satellite deployment	8 August	Successful
31 July; 13:56:48	(Italy) TSS-1	ASI	Low Earth (Atlantis)	Technology	8 August	Failure
31 July; 13:56:48	EURECA	ESA	Low Earth	Microgravity/Solar	1 July 1993	Successful
31 July; 13:56:48	Crewed orbital flight with seven astronauts including the first Swiss and Italian in space TSS tether jammed during deployment; EURECA returned to Earth by Space Shuttle Endeavour during STS-57					
=== August ===
6 August; 19:30:59	(Russia) Molniya-M/ML		(Russia) Plesetsk Site 43/3		(Russia) VKS	
6 August; 19:30:59	(Russia) Molniya-1 #84	MOM	Molniya	Communications	4 April 2008	Successful
9 August; 08:00	(China) Long March 2D		(China) Jiuquan LA-2B		(China) CALT	
9 August; 08:00	(China) FSW-2 #1	CASC	Low Earth	Reconnaissance	1 September	Successful
10 August; 23:08:07	(France) Ariane 4 42P		(France) Kourou ELA-2		(France) Arianespace	
10 August; 23:08:07	(France) (United States) TOPEX/Poseidon	CNES/NASA	Low Earth	Oceanography	In orbit	Successful
10 August; 23:08:07	(France) S80/T	CNES	Low Earth	Technology	In orbit	Successful
10 August; 23:08:07	(South Korea) KITSAT-1 (OSCAR-23)	KAIST	Low Earth	Communications	In orbit	Successful
10 August; 23:08:07	TOPEX/Poseidon mission ended in October 2005 and was deactivated on 18 January 2006. KITSAT-1 was the first South Korean satellite.					
12 August; 05:44:01	(Russia) Kosmos-3M		(Russia) Plesetsk Site 132/1		(Russia) VKS	
12 August; 05:44:01	(Russia) Kosmos 2208 (Strela-2M)	MO RF	Low Earth	Communications	In orbit	Successful
13 August; 23:00	(China) Long March 2E		(China) Xichang LA-2		(China) CALT	
13 August; 23:00	(Australia) Optus B1	Optus	Current: Graveyard; Operational: Geostationary	Communications	In orbit	Successful
13 August; 23:00	Retired and moved to graveyard orbit in May 2008					
15 August; 22:18:32	(Russia) Soyuz-U2		(Kazakhstan) Baikonur Site 31/6		(Russia) VKS	
15 August; 22:18:32	(Russia) Progress M-14	Roskosmos	Low Earth (Mir)	Logistics	21 October	Successful
19 August; 10:20	(Russia) Soyuz-U		(Russia) Plesetsk Site 16/2		(Russia) VKS	
19 August; 10:20	(Russia) Resurs-F #16	MO RF	Low Earth	Remote sensing	4 September	Successful
19 August; 10:20	(Russia) Pion-Germes 1	MOM	Low Earth	Remote sensing	25 September	Successful
19 August; 10:20	(Russia) Pion-Germes 2	MOM	Low Earth	Remote sensing	24 September	Successful
22 August; 22:40	(United States) Atlas I		(United States) Cape Canaveral LC-36B		(United States) General Dynamics	
22 August; 22:40	(United States) Galaxy 1R	Hughes	Intended: Geosynchronous	Communications	22 August	Launch failure
22 August; 22:40	Upper stage turbopump failed to start, destroyed by range safety					
31 August; 10:41	(United States) Delta II 7925		(United States) Cape Canaveral LC-17B		(United States) McDonnell Douglas	
31 August; 10:41	(United States) Satcom C4	GE Americom	Geostationary	Communications	In orbit	Successful
=== September ===
9 September; 08:57	(United States) Delta II 7925		(United States) Cape Canaveral LC-17A		(United States) McDonnell Douglas	
9 September; 08:57	(United States) USA-84 (GPS IIA-6)	US Air Force	Medium Earth	Navigation	In orbit	Operational
10 September; 18:01:18	(Russia) Proton-K/DM-2		(Kazakhstan) Baikonur Site 81/23		(Russia) VKS	
10 September; 18:01:18	(Russia) Kosmos 2209 (Prognoz)	MO RF	Geostationary	Missile defence	In orbit	Operational
10 September; 23:04	(France) Ariane 4 44LP		(France) Kourou ELA-2		(France) Arianespace	
10 September; 23:04	(Spain) Hispasat 1A	Hispasat	Geostationary	Communications	In orbit	Successful
10 September; 23:04	(United States) Satcom C3	GE Americom	Geostationary	Communications	In orbit	Operational
10 September; 23:04	Hispasat retired in 2003					
12 September; 14:23	(United States) Space Shuttle Endeavour		(United States) Kennedy LC-39B		(United States) United Space Alliance	
12 September; 14:23	(United States) STS-47	NASA	Low Earth	Microgravity	20 September	Successful
12 September; 14:23	(Japan) (United States) Spacelab Long Module 2	NASDA/NASA	Low Earth (Endeavour)	Spacelab-J	20 September	Successful
12 September; 14:23	Crewed orbital flight with seven astronauts; 50th mission of the Space Shuttle programme					
22 September; 16:10	(Russia) Soyuz-U		(Russia) Plesetsk Site 16/2		(Russia) VKS	
22 September; 16:10	(Russia) Kosmos 2210 (Yantar-4K2)	MO RF	Low Earth	Reconnaissance	20 November	Successful
25 September; 17:05:01	(United States) Commercial Titan III/TOS		(United States) Cape Canaveral LC-40		(United States) Martin Marietta	
25 September; 17:05:01	(United States) Mars Observer	NASA	Intended: Areocentric; Achieved: Heliocentric	Mars orbiter	Unknown	Partial failure
25 September; 17:05:01	Final flight of Commercial Titan III; Maiden flight of TOS; Contact lost three days before orbit insertion. It is unclear whether the spacecraft entered Aerocentric orbit, remained in Heliocentric orbit, or exploded.					
=== October ===
6 October; 06:20:05	(China) Long March 2C		(China) Jiuquan LA-2B		(China) CALT	
6 October; 06:20:05	(China) FSW-1 #4	CASC	Low Earth	Reconnaissance	13 October	Successful
6 October; 06:20:05	(Sweden) Freja	SSC	Low Earth	Magnetosphere	In orbit	Successful
6 October; 06:20:05	Freja mission ended 30 June 1995 and last contact made on 14 October 1996					
8 October; 19:00	(Russia) Soyuz-U		(Russia) Plesetsk Site 43/4		(Russia) VKS	
8 October; 19:00	(Russia) Foton-8	Roskosmos	Low Earth	Microgravity	24 October	Successful
12 October; 09:47	(United States) Delta II 7925		(United States) Cape Canaveral LC-17B		(United States) McDonnell Douglas	
12 October; 09:47	(Germany) DFS-3	Bundespost	Current: Graveyard; Operational: Geostationary	Communications	In orbit	Successful
12 October; 09:47	Retired in February 2003					
14 October; 19:58	(Russia) Molniya-M/ML		(Russia) Plesetsk Site 43/3		(Russia) VKS	
14 October; 19:58	(Russia) Molniya-3 #50L	MOM	Molniya	Communications	In orbit	Operational
20 October; 12:58:12	(Ukraine) Tsyklon-3		(Russia) Plesetsk		(Russia) VKS	
20 October; 12:58:12	(Russia) Kosmos 2211 (Strela-3)	MO RF	Low Earth	Communications	In orbit	Successful
20 October; 12:58:12	(Russia) Kosmos 2212 (Strela-3)	MO RF	Low Earth	Communications	In orbit	Successful
20 October; 12:58:12	(Russia) Kosmos 2213 (Strela-3)	MO RF	Low Earth	Communications	In orbit	Successful
20 October; 12:58:12	(Russia) Kosmos 2214 (Strela-3)	MO RF	Low Earth	Communications	In orbit	Successful
20 October; 12:58:12	(Russia) Kosmos 2215 (Strela-3)	MO RF	Low Earth	Communications	In orbit	Successful
20 October; 12:58:12	(Russia) Kosmos 2216 (Strela-3)	MO RF	Low Earth	Communications	In orbit	Successful
21 October; 10:21:22	(Russia) Molniya-M/2BL		(Russia) Plesetsk Site 16/2		(Russia) VKS	
21 October; 10:21:22	(Russia) Kosmos 2217 (Oko)	MO RF	Molniya	Missile defence	6 November 2010; 04:22	Successful
22 October; 17:09:40	(United States) Space Shuttle Columbia		(United States) Kennedy LC-39B		(United States) United Space Alliance	
22 October; 17:09:40	(United States) STS-52	NASA	Low Earth	USMP-1	1 November	Successful
22 October; 17:09:40	(Canada) CANEX-2	CSA	Low Earth (Columbia)	Microgravity	1 November	Successful
22 October; 17:09:40	(Italy) LAGEOS-2	ASI	Medium Earth	Geodesy	In orbit	Operational
22 October; 17:09:40	Crewed orbital flight with six astronauts					
27 October; 17:19:41	(Russia) Soyuz-U2		(Kazakhstan) Baikonur Site 31/6		(Russia) VKS	
27 October; 17:19:41	(Russia) Progress M-15	Roskosmos	Low Earth (Mir)	Logistics	7 February 1993	Successful
27 October; 17:19:41	(Russia) Mak-2	Roskosmos	Low Earth	Ionosphere	1 April 1993	Successful
27 October; 17:19:41	(Russia) Znamya 2	Roskosmos	Low Earth	Solar mirror	5 February 1993	Successful
27 October; 17:19:41	Mak-2 deployed from Mir on 20 November 1992; Znamya deployed from Progress on 4 February 1993					
28 October; 00:15	(France) Ariane 4 42P		(France) Kourou ELA-2		(France) Arianespace	
28 October; 00:15	(United States) Galaxy 7	Hughes	Geostationary	Communications	In orbit	Spacecraft failure
28 October; 00:15	Major spacecraft malfunction November 2000					
29 October; 10:40:33	(Russia) Kosmos-3M		(Russia) Plesetsk Site 133/3		(Russia) VKS	
29 October; 10:40:33	(Russia) Kosmos 2218 (Parus)	MO RF	Low Earth	Navigation	In orbit	Successful
30 October; 14:59	(Russia) Proton-K/DM-2		(Kazakhstan) Baikonur Site 81/23		(Russia) VKS	
30 October; 14:59	(Russia) Ekran-M3	MOM	Geostationary	Communications	In orbit	Successful
=== November ===
15 November; 21:45:01	(Russia) Soyuz-U		(Russia) Plesetsk Site 16/2		(Russia) VKS	
15 November; 21:45:01	(Russia) Resurs 500	MOM	Low Earth	Remote sensing	22 November	Successful
17 November; 07:47	(Ukraine) Zenit-2		(Kazakhstan) Baikonur Site 45/1		(Russia) VKS	
17 November; 07:47	(Russia) Kosmos 2219 (Tselina-2)	MO RF	Low Earth	ELINT	In orbit	Operational
20 November; 15:29:59	(Russia) Soyuz-U		(Russia) Plesetsk Site 43/4		(Russia) VKS	
20 November; 15:29:59	(Russia) Kosmos 2220 (Yantar-4K2)	MO RF	Low Earth	Reconnaissance	18 January 1993	Successful
21 November; 13:45	(United States) Scout G-1		(United States) Vandenberg SLC-5		(United States) NASA	
21 November; 13:45	(United States) MSTI-1	US Air Force/SDIO	Sun-synchronous	Technology	18 July 1993	Successful
22 November; 23:54	(United States) Delta II 7925		(United States) Cape Canaveral LC-17A		(United States) McDonnell Douglas	
22 November; 23:54	(United States) USA-85 (GPS IIA-7)	US Air Force	Medium Earth	Navigation	In orbit	Successful
24 November; 04:09:59	(Ukraine) Tsyklon-3		(Russia) Plesetsk		(Russia) VKS	
24 November; 04:09:59	(Russia) Kosmos 2221 (Tselina-D)	MO RF	Low Earth	ELINT	In orbit	Successful
25 November; 12:18:54	(Russia) Molniya-M/2BL		(Russia) Plesetsk Site 43/3		(Russia) VKS	
25 November; 12:18:54	(Russia) Kosmos 2222 (Oko)	MO RF	Molniya	Missile defence	3 May 2023; 03:58	Successful
27 November; 13:10	(Russia) Proton-K/DM-2		(Kazakhstan) Baikonur Site 81/23		(Russia) VKS	
27 November; 13:10	(Russia) Gorizont 27	YeSSS	Geostationary	Communications	In orbit	Successful
28 November; 21:34	(United States) Titan IVA (404)		(United States) Vandenberg SLC-4E		(United States) US Air Force	
28 November; 21:34	(United States) USA-86 (KH-12-1)	NRO	Sun-synchronous	Reconnaissance	5 June 2000	Successful
=== December ===
1 December; 22:48	(France) Ariane 4 42P		(France) Kourou ELA-2		(France) Arianespace	
1 December; 22:48	(Japan) Superbird A1	SCC	Geostationary	Communications	In orbit	Successful
2 December; 01:57	(Russia) Molniya-M/ML		(Russia) Plesetsk Site 43/3		(Russia) VKS	
2 December; 01:57	(Russia) Molniya-3 #56L	MOM	Molniya	Communications	8 November 2008	Successful
2 December; 13:24	(United States) Space Shuttle Discovery		(United States) Kennedy LC-39A		(United States) United Space Alliance	
2 December; 13:24	(United States) STS-53	NASA	Low Earth	Satellite deployment	9 December	Successful
2 December; 13:24	(United States) USA-89 (SDS-2-3)	NRO	Molniya	Communications	In orbit	Operational
2 December; 13:24	(United States) ODERACS A	NASA	Low Earth	Calibration	9 December	Failure
2 December; 13:24	(United States) ODERACS B	NASA	Low Earth	Calibration	9 December	Failure
2 December; 13:24	(United States) ODERACS C	NASA	Low Earth	Calibration	9 December	Failure
2 December; 13:24	(United States) ODERACS D	NASA	Low Earth	Calibration	9 December	Failure
2 December; 13:24	(United States) ODERACS E	NASA	Low Earth	Calibration	9 December	Failure
2 December; 13:24	(United States) ODERACS F	NASA	Low Earth	Calibration	9 December	Failure
2 December; 13:24	Crewed orbital flight with five astronauts; ODERACS deployment cancelled and reflown on STS-60					
9 December; 11:25	(Russia) Soyuz-U		(Kazakhstan) Baikonur Site 1/5		(Russia) VKS	
9 December; 11:25	(Russia) Kosmos 2223 (Yantar-4KS1)	MO RF	Low Earth	Reconnaissance	16 December 1993	Successful
17 December; 12:45	(Russia) Proton-K/DM-2		(Kazakhstan) Baikonur Site 200/39		(Russia) VKS	
17 December; 12:45	(Russia) Kosmos 2224 (Prognoz)	MO RF	Geosynchronous	Missile defence	In orbit	Operational
18 December; 22:16	(United States) Delta II 7925		(United States) Cape Canaveral LC-17B		(United States) McDonnell Douglas	
18 December; 22:16	(United States) USA-87 (GPS IIA-8)	US Air Force	Medium Earth	Navigation	In orbit	Successful
21 December; 11:21	(China) Long March 2E		(China) Xichang LA-2		(China) CALT	
21 December; 11:21	(Australia) Optus B2	Optus	Intended: Geosynchronous; Achieved: Low Earth	Communications	29 June 1995	Launch Partial Failure
21 December; 11:21	Payload fairing collapsed during ascent; rocket continued to orbit deploying remains of payload and upper stage into low Earth orbit					
22 December; 12:00	(Russia) Soyuz-U		(Kazakhstan) Baikonur Site 31/6		(Russia) VKS	
22 December; 12:00	(Russia) Kosmos 2225 (Orlets)	MO RF	Low Earth	Reconnaissance	18 February 1993	Successful
22 December; 12:36	(Ukraine) Tsyklon-3		(Russia) Plesetsk Site 32/2		(Russia) VKS	
22 December; 12:36	(Russia) Kosmos 2226 (Geo-IK)	MO RF	Low Earth	Geodesy	In orbit	Successful
25 December; 05:56	(Ukraine) Zenit-2		(Kazakhstan) Baikonur Site 45/1		(Russia) VKS	
25 December; 05:56	(Russia) Kosmos 2227 (Tselina-2)	MO RF	Low Earth	ELINT	In orbit	Successful
25 December; 20:07:59	(Ukraine) Tsyklon-3		(Russia) Plesetsk		(Russia) VKS	
25 December; 20:07:59	(Russia) Kosmos 2228 (Tselina-D)	MO RF	Low Earth	ELINT	In orbit	Successful
29 December; 13:30:01	(Russia) Soyuz-U		(Russia) Plesetsk Site 43/3		(Russia) VKS	
29 December; 13:30:01	(Russia) Kosmos 2229 (Bion 10)	Roskosmos	Low Earth	Biological	10 January 1993	Successful

- ← Jan
- Feb
- Mar
- Apr
- May
- Jun
- Jul
- Aug
- Sep
- Oct
- Nov
- Dec →

== Suborbital launches ==
- ← Jan
- Feb
- Mar
- Apr
- May
- Jun
- Jul
- Aug
- Sep
- Oct
- Nov
- Dec →

Date and time (UTC)	Rocket	Flight number	Launch site		LSP	
Date and time (UTC)	Payload (⚀ = CubeSat)	Operator	Orbit	Function	Decay (UTC)	Outcome
Date and time (UTC)	Remarks					
=== January ===
11 January; 03:40	(Canada) Black Brant IX		(United States) White Sands LC-36		(United States) NASA	
11 January; 03:40		NASA	Suborbital	Astronomy	11 January	Successful
11 January; 03:40	Apogee: 248 kilometres (154 mi)					
17 January	(United States) Storm		(United States) White Sands SULF		(United States) US Air Force	
17 January	(United States) BTTV-1	US Air Force	Suborbital	Test flight	17 January	Successful
17 January	Apogee: 200 kilometres (120 mi)					
23 January; 19:19	(Canada) Black Brant IX		(United States) White Sands LC-36		(United States) NASA	
23 January; 19:19		NASA	Suborbital	Plasma	23 January	Successful
23 January; 19:19	Apogee: 300 kilometres (190 mi)					
28 January; 12:00	(Japan) S-310		(Japan) Kagoshima LA-K		(Japan) ISAS	
28 January; 12:00		ISAS	Suborbital	Aeronomy	28 January	Successful
28 January; 12:00	Apogee: 223 kilometres (139 mi)					
31 January; 11:55	(Canada) Black Brant IX		(United States) White Sands LC-36		(United States) NASA	
31 January; 11:55	(United States) SXT	NASA/Boulder	Suborbital	X-ray astronomy	31 January	Successful
31 January; 11:55	Apogee: 300 kilometres (190 mi)					
=== February ===
1 February; 16:00	(Japan) S-520		(Japan) Kagoshima LA-K		(Japan) ISAS	
1 February; 16:00	(Japan) CIR	ISAS	Suborbital	Infrared astronomy	1 February	Successful
1 February; 16:00	Apogee: 338 kilometres (210 mi)					
18 February	(United States) Aries		(United States) White Sands LC-36		(United States) SDIO	
18 February		SDIO	Suborbital	Technology	18 February	Successful
18 February	Apogee: 320 kilometres (200 mi)					
22 February; 03:15	(Canada) Black Brant IX		(United States) White Sands LC-36		(United States) NASA	
22 February; 03:15		NASA	Suborbital	Astronomy	22 February	Successful
22 February; 03:15	Apogee: 300 kilometres (190 mi)					
22 February	(United States) UGM-133 Trident II		(United States) USS West Virginia, Eastern Range		(United States) US Navy	
22 February		US Navy	Suborbital	Test flight	22 February	Successful
22 February	Commander's Evaluation Test; Apogee: 1,000 kilometres (620 mi)					
22 February	(United States) UGM-133 Trident II		(United States) USS West Virginia, Eastern Range		(United States) US Navy	
22 February		US Navy	Suborbital	Test flight	22 February	Successful
22 February	Commander's Evaluation Test; Apogee: 1,000 kilometres (620 mi)					
22 February	(United States) UGM-133 Trident II		(United States) USS West Virginia, Eastern Range		(United States) US Navy	
22 February		US Navy	Suborbital	Test flight	22 February	Successful
22 February	Commander's Evaluation Test; Apogee: 1,000 kilometres (620 mi)					
22 February	(United States) UGM-133 Trident II		(United States) USS West Virginia, Eastern Range		(United States) US Navy	
22 February		US Navy	Suborbital	Test flight	22 February	Successful
22 February	Commander's Evaluation Test; Apogee: 1,000 kilometres (620 mi)					
=== March ===
3 March; 13:57:30	(United States) Nike Tomahawk		(United States) Poker Flat		(United States) NASA	
3 March; 13:57:30	(United States) Aria-1	NASA	Suborbital	Plasma	3 March	Successful
3 March; 13:57:30	Apogee: 295 kilometres (183 mi)					
3 March; 14:06:48	(Canada) Black Brant VIIIC		(United States) Poker Flat		(United States) NASA	
3 March; 14:06:48	(United States) Aria-1	NASA	Suborbital	Plasma	3 March	Successful
3 March; 14:06:48	Apogee: 289 kilometres (180 mi)					
3 March; 14:57	(United States) Nike Tomahawk		(United States) Poker Flat		(United States) NASA	
3 March; 14:57	(United States) Aria-1	NASA	Suborbital	Plasma	3 March	Successful
3 March; 14:57	Apogee: 270 kilometres (170 mi)					
4 March	(United States) LGM-118 Peacekeeper		(United States) Vandenberg LF-05		(United States) US Air Force	
4 March		US Air Force	Suborbital	Test flight	4 March	Successful
4 March	Apogee: 1,000 kilometres (620 mi)					
6 March; 13:57:30	(United States) Nike Tomahawk		(United States) Poker Flat		(United States) NASA	
6 March; 13:57:30		NASA	Suborbital	Plasma	6 March	Successful
6 March; 13:57:30	Apogee: 270 kilometres (170 mi)					
12 March; 22:42	(United States) Nike Orion		(United States) White Sands		(United States) NASA	
12 March; 22:42	(United States) CWAS-21	NASA	Suborbital	Aeronomy	12 March	Successful
12 March; 22:42	Apogee: 140 kilometres (87 mi)					
13 March; 18:15	(United States) LGM-30B Minuteman I		(United States) Vandenberg LF-03		(United States) US Air Force	
13 March; 18:15		US Air Force	Suborbital	Target	13 March	Successful
13 March; 18:15	Apogee: 1,300 kilometres (810 mi)					
13 March; 18:36:27	(United States) Aries		(Marshall Islands) Meck		(United States) US Air Force	
13 March; 18:36:27	(United States) ERIS	US Air Force	Suborbital	Interceptor	13 March	Partial failure
13 March; 18:36:27	Final flight of ERIS; missed target due to programming issue caused by test conditions, enough data collected to proceed with operagional programme. Apogee: 290 kilometres (180 mi)					
15 March; 22:46	(United States) Nike Orion		(United States) White Sands		(United States) NASA	
15 March; 22:46	(United States) CWAS-22	NASA	Suborbital	Aeronomy	15 March	Successful
15 March; 22:46	Apogee: 140 kilometres (87 mi)					
18 March	(United States) Scout-II		(Italy) Salto di Quirra		(Italy) ASI	
18 March		ASI	Suborbital	Test flight	18 March	Launch failure
19 March; 16:05	(Canada) Black Brant IX		(United States) White Sands LC-36		(Canada) CSA	
19 March; 16:05	(Canada) CSAR-1	CSA	Suborbital	Microgravity	19 March	Successful
19 March; 16:05	Apogee: 226 kilometres (140 mi)					
19 March; 16:10	(Canada) Black Brant IX		(United States) White Sands LC-36		(United States) NASA	
19 March; 16:10	(United States) HIRAAS-2	NASA	Suborbital	Airglow	19 March	Successful
19 March; 16:10	Apogee: 300 kilometres (190 mi)					
29 March; 07:27	(Canada) Black Brant XI		(United States) Poker Flat		(United States) NASA	
29 March; 07:27	(United States) CHARGE-2B	NASA	Suborbital	Ionosphere	29 March	Successful
29 March; 07:27	Apogee: 267 kilometres (166 mi)					
29 March; 08:07:45	(United States) HPB		(United States) Poker Flat		(United States) Orbital Sciences	
29 March; 08:07:45		Orbital Sciences	Suborbital	Infrared astronomy	29 March	Successful
29 March; 08:07:45	Apogee: 400 kilometres (250 mi)					
=== April ===
8 April	(United States) UGM-96 Trident I		(United States) USS Henry L. Stimson, Eastern Range		(United States) US Navy	
8 April		US Navy	Suborbital	Test flight	8 April	Successful
8 April	Follow-on Commander's Evaluation Test 40; Apogee: 1,000 kilometres (620 mi)					
8 April	(United States) UGM-96 Trident I		(United States) USS Henry L. Stimson, Eastern Range		(United States) US Navy	
8 April		US Navy	Suborbital	Test flight	8 April	Successful
8 April	Follow-on Commander's Evaluation Test 40; Apogee: 1,000 kilometres (620 mi)					
9 April; 10:40	(Canada) Black Brant IXBM1		(Sweden) Esrange		(Sweden) SSC	
9 April; 10:40	(Sweden) MASER-5	SSC	Suborbital	Microgravity	9 April	Successful
9 April; 10:40	Apogee: 317 kilometres (197 mi)					
15 April; 09:09	(United States) HPB		(United States) Wallops Island		(United States) Orbital Sciences	
15 April; 09:09		Orbital Sciences	Suborbital	Target	15 April	Successful
15 April; 09:09	Apogee: 450 kilometres (280 mi)					
29 April	(China) DF-21		(China) Taiyuan		(China) CALT	
29 April		CALT	Suborbital	Test flight	29 April	Launch failure
=== May ===
5 May	(United States) LGM-30G Minuteman III		(United States) Vandenberg LF-10		(United States) US Air Force	
5 May	(United States) GT-147GM-1	US Air Force	Suborbital	Test flight	5 May	Successful
5 May	Apogee: 1,300 kilometres (810 mi)					
5 May	(India) Prithvi		(India) Balasore		(India) DRDO	
5 May		DRDO	Suborbital	Test flight	5 May	Successful
5 May	Apogee: 100 kilometres (62 mi)					
12 May; 14:26	(Canada) Black Brant IX		(United States) White Sands LC-36		(United States) NASA	
12 May; 14:26	(United States) SPARTAN (SPDE)	NASA	Suborbital	Solar	12 May	Successful
12 May; 14:26	Apogee: 300 kilometres (190 mi)					
23 May; 00:00	(United States) Nike Orion		(United States) White Sands		(United States)	
23 May; 00:00	(United States) CWAS-23	NASA	Suborbital	Aeronomy	23 May	Successful
23 May; 00:00	Apogee: 140 kilometres (87 mi)					
24 May	(United States) Terrier Malemute		(United States) Barking Sands		(United States) SDIO	
24 May	(United States) CDX (LWIS)	SDIO	Suborbital	Target	24 May	Successful
24 May	Apogee: 290 kilometres (180 mi)					
25 May; 23:52	(United States) Nike Tomahawk		(United States) Arecibo		(United States) NASA	
25 May; 23:52	(United States) AA-3A	NASA	Suborbital	Plasma	25 May	Successful
25 May; 23:52	Apogee: 270 kilometres (170 mi)					
27 May; 12:27	(United States) Nike Orion		(United States) White Sands		(United States) NASA	
27 May; 12:27	(United States) CWAS-24	NASA	Suborbital	Aeronomy	27 May	Successful
27 May; 12:27	Apogee: 140 kilometres (87 mi)					
28 May	(India) Agni-I		(India) Balasore		(India) DRDO	
28 May		DRDO	Suborbital	Test flight	28 May	Failure
30 May; 08:11	(Canada) Black Brant IX		(United States) Arecibo		(United States) NASA	
30 May; 08:11	(United States) AA-4IFH	NASA/NRL	Suborbital	Plasma	30 May	Successful
30 May; 08:11	Apogee: 308 kilometres (191 mi)					
May	(China) DF-21		(China) Taiyuan		(China) CALT	
May		CALT	Suborbital	Test flight	L+1 hour	Failure
=== June ===
1 June; 02:52	(Brazil) Sonda 3		(Brazil) Alcântara		(Brazil) INPE	
1 June; 02:52		INPE	Suborbital	Aeronomy	1 June	Successful
1 June; 02:52	Apogee: 282 kilometres (175 mi)					
2 June	(United States) LGM-30G Minuteman III		(United States) Vandenberg LF-26		(United States) US Air Force	
2 June	(United States) GT-148GB	US Air Force	Suborbital	Test flight	2 June	Successful
2 June	Apogee: 1,300 kilometres (810 mi)					
6 June; 08:37:31	(Canada) Black Brant IX		(United States) Arecibo		(United States) NASA	
6 June; 08:37:31	(United States) AA-3B	NASA	Suborbital	Plasma	6 June	Successful
6 June; 08:37:31	Apogee: 370 kilometres (230 mi)					
9 June; 05:32	(Canada) Black Brant IX		(United States) Arecibo		(United States) NASA	
9 June; 05:32		NASA	Suborbital	Plasma	9 June	Successful
9 June; 05:32	Apogee: 300 kilometres (190 mi)					
16 June	(United States) Storm		(United States) White Sands SULF		(United States) US Air Force	
16 June	(United States) BTTV-2	US Air Force	Suborbital	Test flight	16 June	Failure
16 June	Apogee: 200 kilometres (120 mi)					
18 June	(United States) UGM-133 Trident II		(United States) USS West Virginia, Eastern Range		(United States) US Navy	
18 June		US Navy	Suborbital	Test flight	18 June	Successful
18 June	Commander's Evaluation Test; Apogee: 1,000 kilometres (620 mi)					
18 June	(United States) UGM-133 Trident II		(United States) USS West Virginia, Eastern Range		(United States) US Navy	
18 June		US Navy	Suborbital	Test flight	18 June	Successful
18 June	Commander's Evaluation Test; Apogee: 1,000 kilometres (620 mi)					
18 June	(United States) UGM-133 Trident II		(United States) USS West Virginia, Eastern Range		(United States) US Navy	
18 June		US Navy	Suborbital	Test flight	18 June	Successful
18 June	Commander's Evaluation Test; Apogee: 1,000 kilometres (620 mi)					
18 June	(United States) UGM-133 Trident II		(United States) USS West Virginia, Eastern Range		(United States) US Navy	
18 June		US Navy	Suborbital	Test flight	18 June	Successful
18 June	Commander's Evaluation Test; Apogee: 1,000 kilometres (620 mi)					
19 June; 11:01	(United States) Aries		(United States) White Sands LC-36		(United States) SDIO	
19 June; 11:01	(United States) LEAP 2	SDIO	Suborbital	Missile defence technology test	19 June	Partial success
19 June; 11:01	(United States) Target	SDIO	Suborbital	Target	19 June	Spacecraft failure
19 June; 11:01	Apogee: 330 kilometres (210 mi). All systems of the LEAP kill vehicle performed as planned. LEAP identified and tracked the target, but not intercepted it due to lower than planned closing velocity.					
23 June; 00:24	(Canada) Black Brant VC		(United States) Arecibo		(United States) NASA	
23 June; 00:24		NASA	Suborbital	Ionosphere	23 June	Successful
23 June; 00:24	Apogee: 250 kilometres (160 mi)					
June	(North Korea) Rodong-1		(North Korea) Musudan-ri		(North Korea) KPA	
June		KPA	Suborbital	Test flight	L+1 hour	Failure
=== July ===
1 July; 02:20	(United States) LGM-118 Peacekeeper		(United States) Vandenberg LF-02		(United States) US Air Force	
1 July; 02:20		US Air Force	Suborbital	Test flight	1 July	Successful
1 July; 02:20	Apogee: 1,000 kilometres (620 mi)					
2 July; 09:01:15	(Canada) Black Brant IX		(United States) Arecibo		(United States) NASA	
2 July; 09:01:15	(United States) AA-1	NASA	Suborbital	Plasma	2 July	Successful
2 July; 09:01:15	Apogee: 250 kilometres (160 mi)					
3 July	(India) RH-560		(India) Sriharikota		(India) ISRO	
3 July		ISRO	Suborbital	Ionosphere	3 July	Successful
3 July	Apogee: 320 kilometres (200 mi)					
4 July; 08:58	(Canada) Black Brant IX		(United States) Arecibo		(United States) NASA	
4 July; 08:58	(United States) AA-7	NASA	Suborbital	Plasma	4 July	Successful
4 July; 08:58	Apogee: 250 kilometres (160 mi)					
12 July; 09:02	(Canada) Black Brant IX		(United States) Arecibo		(United States) NASA	
12 July; 09:02	(United States) AA-2	NASA	Suborbital	Plasma	12 July	Successful
12 July; 09:02	Apogee: 252 kilometres (157 mi)					
24 July; 13:36	(Canada) Black Brant VIIIC		(United States) Poker Flat		(United States) NASA	
24 July; 13:36		NASA	Suborbital	Plasma	24 July	Successful
24 July; 13:36	Apogee: 340 kilometres (210 mi)					
28 July	(Russia) UR-100NU		(Kazakhstan) Baikonur		(Russia) RVSN	
28 July	(Russia) SLI	RVSN	Suborbital	Test flight	28 July	Successful
28 July	Apogee: 1,000 kilometres (620 mi)					
29 July	(United States) UGM-133 Trident II		(United States) USS Maryland, Eastern Range		(United States) US Navy	
29 July		US Navy	Suborbital	Test flight	29 July	Successful
29 July	Demonstration and Shakedown Operation 9; Apogee: 1,000 kilometres (620 mi)					
July	(North Korea) Hwasong-6		(Syria)		(Syria) Syrian Air Force	
July		Syrian Air Force	Suborbital	Test flight	L+1 hour	Successful
July	Apogee: 200 kilometres (120 mi)					
July	(North Korea) Hwasong-6		(Syria)		(Syria) Syrian Air Force	
July		Syrian Air Force	Suborbital	Test flight	L+1 hour	Successful
July	Apogee: 200 kilometres (120 mi)					
=== August ===
4 August	(United States) UGM-133 Trident II		(United States) USS Tennessee, Eastern Range		(United States) US Navy	
4 August		US Navy	Suborbital	Test flight	4 August	Successful
4 August	Commander's Evaluation Test; Apogee: 1,000 kilometres (620 mi)					
4 August	(United States) UGM-133 Trident II		(United States) USS Tennessee, Eastern Range		(United States) US Navy	
4 August		US Navy	Suborbital	Test flight	4 August	Successful
4 August	Commander's Evaluation Test; Apogee: 1,000 kilometres (620 mi)					
4 August	(United States) UGM-133 Trident II		(United States) USS Tennessee, Eastern Range		(United States) US Navy	
4 August		US Navy	Suborbital	Test flight	4 August	Successful
4 August	Commander's Evaluation Test; Apogee: 1,000 kilometres (620 mi)					
4 August	(United States) UGM-133 Trident II		(United States) USS Tennessee, Eastern Range		(United States) US Navy	
4 August		US Navy	Suborbital	Test flight	4 August	Successful
4 August	Commander's Evaluation Test; Apogee: 1,000 kilometres (620 mi)					
18 August	(India) Prithvi		(India) Balasore		(India) DRDO	
18 August		DRDO	Suborbital	Test flight	18 August	Successful
18 August	Apogee: 100 kilometres (62 mi)					
19 August; 23:30	(Japan) TR-1A		(Japan) Tanegashima LA-T		(Japan) NASDA	
19 August; 23:30		NASDA	Suborbital	Microgravity	19 August	Successful
19 August; 23:30	Apogee: 290 kilometres (180 mi)					
21 August; 17:46	(United States) Nike Orion		(United States) White Sands		(United States) NASA	
21 August; 17:46		NASA	Suborbital	Aeronomy	21 August	Successful
21 August; 17:46	Apogee: 140 kilometres (87 mi)					
24 August; 16:30	(Canada) Black Brant IX		(United States) White Sands LC-36		(United States) NASA	
24 August; 16:30	(United States) HRTS-8	NASA/NRL	Suborbital	Solar	24 August	Successful
24 August; 16:30	Apogee: 249 kilometres (155 mi)					
26 August; 15:10	(United States) Nike Orion		(United States) White Sands		(United States) NASA	
26 August; 15:10	(United States) CWAS-25	NASA	Suborbital	Aeronomy	26 August	Successful
26 August; 15:10	Apogee: 140 kilometres (87 mi)					
27 August; 18:30	(Canada) Black Brant VIIIC		(United States) Wallops Island		(United States) NASA	
27 August; 18:30		NASA	Suborbital	Test flight	27 August	Successful
27 August; 18:30	Apogee: 198 kilometres (123 mi)					
=== September ===
1 September; 01:00	(United States) Nike Orion		(United States) White Sands		(United States) NASA	
1 September; 01:00	(United States) CWAS-26	NASA	Suborbital	Aeronomy	1 September	Successful
1 September; 01:00	Apogee: 140 kilometres (87 mi)					
3 September	(United States) UGM-133 Trident II		(United States) USS Kentucky, Eastern Range		(United States) US Navy	
3 September		US Navy	Suborbital	Test flight	3 September	Successful
3 September	Commander's Evaluation Test; Apogee: 1,000 kilometres (620 mi)					
3 September	(United States) UGM-133 Trident II		(United States) USS Kentucky, Eastern Range		(United States) US Navy	
3 September		US Navy	Suborbital	Test flight	3 September	Successful
3 September	Commander's Evaluation Test; Apogee: 1,000 kilometres (620 mi)					
3 September	(United States) UGM-133 Trident II		(United States) USS Kentucky, Eastern Range		(United States) US Navy	
3 September		US Navy	Suborbital	Test flight	3 September	Successful
3 September	Commander's Evaluation Test; Apogee: 1,000 kilometres (620 mi)					
3 September	(United States) UGM-133 Trident II		(United States) USS Kentucky, Eastern Range		(United States) US Navy	
3 September		US Navy	Suborbital	Test flight	3 September	Successful
3 September	Commander's Evaluation Test; Apogee: 1,000 kilometres (620 mi)					
10 September; 14:30	(Canada) Black Brant IXCM1		(United States) White Sands LC-36		(United States) SSI	
10 September; 14:30	(United States) CONSORT-5	Huntsville	Suborbital	Microgravity	10 September	Failure
10 September; 14:30	Apogee: 235 kilometres (146 mi)					
16 September; 03:15	(United States) LGM-118 Peacekeeper		(United States) Vandenberg LF-05		(United States) US Air Force	
16 September; 03:15		US Air Force	Suborbital	Test flight	16 September	Successful
16 September; 03:15	Apogee: 1,000 kilometres (620 mi)					
28 September	(United States) LGM-30G Minuteman III		(United States) Vandenberg LF-26		(United States) US Air Force	
28 September	(United States) GT-149GB	US Air Force	Suborbital	Test flight	28 September	Successful
28 September	Apogee: 1,300 kilometres (810 mi)					
=== October ===
16 October	(United States) Castor-Orbus		(United States) Wake Island		(United States) Orbital Sciences	
16 October		SDIO	Suborbital	Reentry test	16 October	Failure
16 October	Maiden flight of Castor-Orbus; Apogee: 500 kilometres (310 mi)					
19 October	(United States) UGM-133 Trident II		(United States) USS Maryland, Eastern Range		(United States) US Navy	
19 October		US Navy	Suborbital	Test flight	19 October	Successful
19 October	Demonstration and Shakedown Operation 10; Apogee: 1,000 kilometres (620 mi)					
22 October	(United States) Aries		(United States) Wallops Island		(United States) SDIO	
22 October	(United States) Orbus 1 (SPFE-3)	SDIO	Suborbital	Target	22 October	Failure
22 October	Apogee: 20 kilometres (12 mi)					
25 October; 01:06	(United States) LGM-30B Minuteman I		(United States) Vandenberg LF-03		(United States) US Air Force	
25 October; 01:06	(United States) AST-DT2	US Air Force	Suborbital	Target	25 October	Failure
25 October; 01:06	Apogee: 100 kilometres (62 mi)					
27 October; 18:30	(Canada) Black Brant IX		(United States) White Sands LC-36		(United States) NASA	
27 October; 18:30	(United States) CU-3	NASA	Suborbital	Ultraviolet astronomy	27 October	Successful
27 October; 18:30	Apogee: 298 kilometres (185 mi)					
=== November ===
4 November; 02:00	(United States) LGM-30G Minuteman III		(United States) Vandenberg LF-04		(United States) US Air Force	
4 November; 02:00	(United States) GT-150GM	US Air Force	Suborbital	Test flight	4 November	Failure
4 November; 02:00	Apogee: 100 kilometres (62 mi)					
8 November; 10:25	(Sweden) Maxus		(Sweden) Esrange		(Sweden) (Germany) SSC/DLR	
8 November; 10:25	MAXUS 1B	ESA	Suborbital	Microgravity	8 November	Successful
8 November; 10:25	Apogee: 717 kilometres (446 mi)					
10 November	(United States) UGM-133 Trident II		(United States) USS Tennessee, Eastern Range		(United States) US Navy	
10 November		US Navy	Suborbital	Test flight	10 November	Successful
10 November	Apogee: 1,000 kilometres (620 mi)					
10 November	(United States) UGM-133 Trident II		(United States) USS Tennessee, Eastern Range		(United States) US Navy	
10 November		US Navy	Suborbital	Test flight	10 November	Successful
10 November	Apogee: 1,000 kilometres (620 mi)					
10 November	(United States) UGM-133 Trident II		(United States) USS Tennessee, Eastern Range		(United States) US Navy	
10 November		US Navy	Suborbital	Test flight	10 November	Successful
10 November	Apogee: 1,000 kilometres (620 mi)					
10 November	(United States) UGM-133 Trident II		(United States) USS Tennessee, Eastern Range		(United States) US Navy	
10 November		US Navy	Suborbital	Test flight	10 November	Successful
10 November	Apogee: 1,000 kilometres (620 mi)					
22 November; 09:22	(United Kingdom) Skylark 7		(Sweden) Esrange LA-S		(Germany) DLR	
22 November; 09:22	(Germany) TEXUS 29	DLR	Suborbital	Microgravity	22 November	Successful
22 November; 09:22	Apogee: 230 kilometres (140 mi)					
=== December ===
1 December	(Russia) UR-100NU		(Kazakhstan) Baikonur		(Russia) RVSN	
1 December		RVSN	Suborbital	Test flight	1 December	Failure
6 December; 16:00	(United States) Nike Orion		(United States) White Sands		(United States) NASA	
6 December; 16:00	(United States) CWAS-27	NASA	Suborbital	Aeronomy	6 December	Successful
6 December; 16:00	Apogee: 140 kilometres (87 mi)					
9 December; 00:00	(Russia) Zyb		(Russia) Submarine, Pacific Ocean		(Russia) VMF	
9 December; 00:00	(Russia) Efir	RVSN	Suborbital	Technology	9 December	Successful
9 December; 00:00	Apogee: 500 kilometres (310 mi)					
9 December	(Canada) Black Brant IXCM1		(France) Centre d'Essais des Landes		(France) MATRA	
9 December	(France) POIVRE (VERT)	MATRA	Suborbital	Imaging	9 December	Successful
9 December	Apogee: 300 kilometres (190 mi)					
11 December; 22:45	(United States) Nike Orion		(United States) White Sands		(United States) NASA	
11 December; 22:45	(United States) CWAS-28	NASA	Suborbital	Aeronomy	11 December	Successful
11 December; 22:45	Apogee: 140 kilometres (87 mi)					
15 December; 03:00	(Canada) Black Brant IX		(United States) White Sands LC-36		(United States) NASA	
15 December; 03:00		NASA/JHU	Suborbital	Ultraviolet astronomy	15 December	Successful
15 December; 03:00	Apogee: 302 kilometres (188 mi)					

- ← Jan
- Feb
- Mar
- Apr
- May
- Jun
- Jul
- Aug
- Sep
- Oct
- Nov
- Dec →

== Deep Space Rendezvous ==
Date (GMT)	Spacecraft	Event	Remarks
8 February	Ulysses	1st flyby of Jupiter	Gravity assist, inclination change
15 February	Hiten	Selenocentric orbit injection	
14 July	Giotto	Flyby of 26P/Grigg-Skjellerup	Closest approach: 200 kilometres (120 mi)
8 October	Pioneer Venus Orbiter	Deliberately deorbited into the Venerian atmosphere	
8 December	Galileo	2nd flyby of the Earth	Gravity assist; Closest approach: 305 kilometres (190 mi)

== EVAs ==
Start date/time	Duration	End time	Spacecraft	Crew	Remarks
20 February; 20:09	4 hours 12 minutes	21 February; 00:21	Mir EO-10; Kvant-2	(Russia) Aleksandr Volkov (Russia) Sergei Krikalev	Performed maintenance activities on the outside of Mir, including cleaning camera lenses. Volkov had problems with the cooling system on his Orlan space suit, and was limited in his mobility.
10 May; 20:40	3 hours 43 minutes	11 May; 00:23	STS-49; Endeavour	(United States) Pierre J. Thuot (United States) Richard Hieb	Thuot attempted to capture the Intelsat VI satellite using a capture bar while Hieb stood by to assist with placement in the payload bay. After multiple attempts to catch Intelsat VI, the spacewalkers returned to the airlock to consider the failed attempts.
11 May; 21:05	5 hours 30 minutes	12 May; 02:35	STS-49; Endeavour	(United States) Pierre J. Thuot (United States) Richard Hieb	Thuot tried five more times to capture Intelsat VI while Hieb stood by to assist. Once again Thuot was unable to engage the capture bar to the satellite.
13 May; 21:17	8 hours 29 minutes	14 May; 05:46	STS-49; Endeavour	(United States) Pierre J. Thuot (United States) Richard Hieb (United States) Thomas Akers	Thuot, Hieb and Akers captured Intelsat VI with their hands. The trio then pulled the satellite into the payload bay, added a new perigee kick motor, and launched the satellite away from Endeavour. This spacewalk was the first three-person spacewalk in history. The three spacewalkers also set a new record for elapsed spacewalk time.
14 May; ~21:00	7 hours 44 minutes	15 May; ~04:45	STS-49; Endeavour	(United States) Thomas Akers (United States) Kathryn C. Thornton	Tested space station assembly techniques on an experimental structure, the Assembly of Station by Extravehicular Activity Methods (ASEM).
8 July; 12:38	2 hours 3 minutes	14:41	Mir EO-11; Kvant-2	(Russia) Aleksandr Viktorenko (Russia) Aleksandr Kaleri	Inspected several gyrodynes, located on the Kvant-2 module, near the airlock to provide data needed to prepare for the planned repair and replacement work of the gyrodynes.
3 September; 13:32	3 hours 56 minutes	17:28	Mir EO-12; Kvant-2	(Russia) Sergei Avdeyev (Russia) Anatoly Solovyev	Moved the VDU thruster unit to its position and prepared the Sofora girder for installation of the VDU.
7 September; 11:47	5 hours 8 minutes	16:55	Mir EO-12; Kvant-2	(Russia) Sergei Avdeyev (Russia) Anatoly Solovyev	Installed the electrical and control cables needed by the VDU thruster for operation on the Sofora truss and recovered the Russian flag installed on the Sofora truss the year before.
11 September; 10:06	5 hours 44 minutes	15:50	Mir EO-12; Kvant-2	(Russia) Sergei Avdeyev (Russia) Anatoly Solovyev	Completed install of the VDU thruster on Sofora truss, and moved the truss into its extended position.
15 September; 07:49	3 hours 33 minutes	11:22	Mir EO-12; Kvant-2	(Russia) Sergei Avdeyev (Russia) Anatoly Solovyev	Collected samples of a solar array and relocated the Kurs docking antenna on the Kristall module in preparation of the arrival of Soyuz TM-16.
