= Soletta =

Soletta may refer to:

- the Italian name for the Swiss city of Solothurn
- the 1956 Soletta 750 concept minicar
- a hypothetical magnifying device constructed in space for the purpose of amplifying the solar radiation a planet receives, in order to generate power or aid in the process of Terraforming. Also see Solar mirror.
