= Reflect Orbital =

American space technology company

Reflect Orbital, Inc
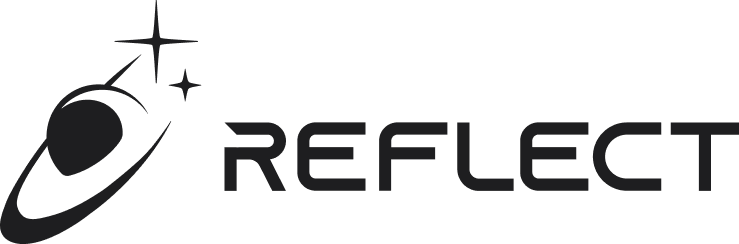
- Type: Private
- Industry: Space
- Founded: January 2021; 5 years ago
- Founders: Ben Nowack; Tristan Semmelhack
- Headquarters: Hawthorne, California, United States
- Products: Eärendil space mirror
- Number of employees: 60 (2026)
- Website: reflectorbital.com

Reflect Orbital, Inc is an American privately held space technology company headquartered in Hawthorne, California. Founded in 2021, the company designs and builds satellites with large-scale deployable mirrors to point sunlight onto Earth's surface. The stated goal is to provide responsive lighting after dark and to increase the effective hours of solar energy production. Investors in the company include venture capital firms such as Sequoia Capital, Lux Capital, and Starship Ventures.

In July 2026, the Federal Communications Commission (FCC) granted the company a license to launch its first demonstration satellite, Eärendil-1, aboard a SpaceX rideshare mission later that year. The company has said it ultimately aims to operate as many as 50,000 reflector satellites in orbit by 2035.

== Background ==
The concept of placing reflective surfaces in orbit to redirect sunlight to the ground predates Reflect Orbital by roughly a century. It was first described by the physicist Hermann Oberth, who from 1923 proposed large orbital mirrors to light the surface and influence the climate. The only such device flown before was Znamya, designed by the Soviet Union and launched by Russia. Znamya 2, deployed from a Progress cargo craft near the Mir space station in February 1993, unfurled a 20 m mylar reflector and briefly cast a moonlight-bright, roughly 5 km spot across Europe. The follow-on mission, Znamya 2.5, failed during deployment in 1999 due to human error.

== History ==
Reflect Orbital was founded in October 2021 by Ben Nowack and Tristan Semmelhack in Santa Monica, California. Nowack is a former aerospace engineer from SpaceX and Semmelhack is a former mechanical engineer at Zipline who dropped out of Stanford University in December 2022 to join Nowack as co-founder.

In March 2024, Reflect Orbital published a demonstration of a square mirror roughly 2.5 m (8 ft) across (about 6 m^{2} or 64 sq ft) being robotically controlled from a hot air balloon to redirect sunlight onto solar panels on the ground during twilight. In one test, the reflected beam delivered about 516 W/m^{2} to instruments 242 m below. By the end of 2025, the company had received more than 260,000 inquiries relating to nighttime illumination for construction projects, public events, search and rescue efforts, military operations, and disaster relief.

The company has designed two proof-of-concept satellite missions intended to reflect light at low intensity comparable to moonlight, both manifested on SpaceX Falcon 9 rideshare launches in 2026. As of July 2026 the FCC had licensed only the first, Eärendil-1. Reflect applied to the Satellite Licensing Division of the FCC for a license to launch and operate a constellation of satellites beginning in 2027. Nowack stated that the company aims by 2030 to field enough satellites to supply solar farms with about 200 W/m^{2}, comparable to sunlight at dawn or dusk, during the evening peak in electricity demand. He described a longer-term goal of as many as 50,000 reflector satellites in low Earth orbit by 2035.

On July 9, 2026, the FCC authorized the construction, launch and operation of Eärendil-1, its first satellite, and issued a two-year authorization for the spacecraft's radio communications. The commission characterized the reflector as a potentially groundbreaking technology whose testing served the public interest, limited the grant to the single demonstration satellite, and concluded that effects on optical astronomy fell outside its regulatory jurisdiction; it also noted the company's commitments to work with NASA and the National Science Foundation to protect optical astronomy. The application had drawn more than 1,800 public comments, many of them opposed.

== Fundraising ==
The company has raised money from venture capitalists and angel investors. In September 2024, Reflect raised US$6.5 million in a seed round led by Shaun Maguire and Sequoia Capital with participation from Baiju Bhatt and Zipline co-founders Keller Rinaudo and Keenan Wyrobek. In May 2025, the company announced that it raised another US$20 million from Lux Capital, Sequoia Capital, and Starship Ventures. In June 2025, the Air Force Research Laboratory and AFWERX awarded the company a US$1.25 million Phase II Small Business Innovation Research (SBIR) contract to develop reflector technology. As of 2026, the company has raised a total of US$35.2 million in funding.

== Eärendil-1 ==
In May 2025, the company announced that its first satellite, Eärendil-1, would act as a demonstration of deployable large-scale heliostat technology in sun-synchronous orbit. The mission has the goal of illuminating ten locations around the globe after launching in 2026.

The vehicle is named after Eärendil the Mariner from Lord of the Rings, a fictional character in The Silmarillion who sails the heavens with a Silmaril bound to his brow, shining light down and becoming known as the Morning Star. Tolkien adapted the name from the Old English Earendel, a word he encountered in the poem Crist by Cynewulf and which he took as the seed of his mythology.

Eärendil-1 has a mass of about 142 kg (313 lb) and carries a steerable, highly specular thin-film reflector measuring 18 metres (59 ft) on each side, for a reflective area of roughly 324 m^{2} (3,500 sq ft). In interviews, Nowack has described the spacecraft as a compact bus that launches folded into a container about the size of a microwave oven and unfurls the reflector once in orbit. The reflective surface is formed from four triangular membrane panels rigged to deployable carbon-fiber booms that unroll like tape measures and can bear roughly 100 kg (220 lb) in compression to hold the membrane taut, likened to sails on a ship. The membrane is a plastic film coated in aluminum and only a few thousand atoms thick, similar to material used in spacecraft multi-layer insulation. It was designed by engineers recruited from NASA's Jet Propulsion Laboratory using an origami folding concept. The completed membrane weighs about 16 kg (35 lb). The sharpness of the reflected spot depends on the optical quality of the membrane; a high-quality mirror confines the light to the intended target and limits spill onto neighboring areas. Once deployed at an altitude of 600–650 km (373–404 mi), the reflector is designed to cast a light spot about 5 km (3.1 mi) in diameter, visible from the ground as a bright moving star.

Nowack has said that the spacecraft points its reflector using control moment gyroscopes, which are periodically desaturated, and that the mirror can be reoriented within seconds to keep its beam on a target as the Earth rotates beneath the satellite. He has also described using solar-radiation pressure on the large membrane for propulsion and orbit maintenance. Because the satellite moves quickly through low Earth orbit, a single spacecraft can illuminate a given 5 km area for only about four minutes per pass, so sustained or higher-intensity lighting would require several satellites acting together; Nowack has said that many reflectors can be aimed at the same target independently without communicating with one another.

The satellite is manifested on a SpaceX rideshare mission scheduled to launch later in 2026. On 9 July 2026, Jay A. Schwarz wrote on behalf of the FCC and granted the license for the first satellite. The company expects the demonstration to be a testbed for deployable technology and plans to test safeguards to inform any future expansion.

== Technology concerns ==
The company's plans have been criticized as having the potential to cause light pollution and interfere with the night sky. Astronomers are concerned that a constellation of bright orbiting objects will interfere with observational astronomy.

A peer-reviewed study by the astronomer Olivier Hainaut of the European Southern Observatory (ESO), published in Astronomy & Astrophysics in July 2026 identified Reflect Orbital's planned fleet as the brightest of the roughly 1.7 million satellites proposed by various operators. An observer within a reflected beam would see the satellite shining about four times brighter than the full moon, although outside the beam, the satellite would be roughly as bright as the planet Venus. With the full constellation of 50,000 satellites, ESO estimated the night sky would become three to four times brighter overall, and warned that illumination from a single mirror-satellite could ruin an exposure from a camera like that of the Vera C. Rubin Observatory. Dark sky advocates have argued that manipulating night-time illumination poses a threat to the health of humans and wildlife by affecting circadian rhythms.

In response, the company has said it would work closely with astronomers during its 2026 demonstration mission to minimize impacts on observations and the night sky. Reflect Orbital stated that it designs for safety by limiting reflected light to a target spot, steering away from sensitive areas such as observatories or protected habitats, and retaining the ability to switch off at any time so that no light is reflected down. The company also says that the light will not be intense enough to start fires or harm eyes, even when viewed through amateur telescopes, and cannot be concentrated beyond the natural irradiance of sunlight.

== See also ==
- Space mirror
- Znamya (satellite)
