= Sputnik 41 =

Franco-Russian amateur radio satellite launched in 1998

- Mission type: Amateur radio
- Operator: Aéro-Club de France; AMSAT; Rosaviakosmos
- COSPAR ID: 1998-062C
- SATCAT no.: 25533
- Mission duration: 1-2 months

Spacecraft properties
- Launch mass: 4 kilograms (8.8 lb)

Start of mission
- Launch date: 25 October 1998, 04:14:57 UTC
- Rocket: Soyuz-U
- Launch site: Baikonur 1/5
- Deployed from: Mir
- Deployment date: 10 November 1998, ~19:30 UTC

End of mission
- Last contact: 11 December 1998
- Decay date: 11 January 1999

Orbital parameters
- Reference system: Geocentric
- Regime: Low Earth
- Perigee altitude: 339 kilometres (211 mi)
- Apogee altitude: 352 kilometres (219 mi)
- Inclination: 51.6 degrees
- Epoch: 24 November 1998

Sputnik 41 (Russian: Спутник 41, French: Spoutnik 41), also known as Sputnik Jr 2 and Radio Sputnik 18 (RS-18), was a Franco-Russian amateur radio satellite which was launched in 1998 to commemorate the hundredth anniversary of the Aéro-Club de France, and the forty-first anniversary of the launch of Sputnik 1, the world's first artificial satellite. A 4-kilogram (8.8 lb) one-third scale model of Sputnik 1, Sputnik 41 was deployed from the Mir space station on 10 November 1998.

Sputnik 41 was launched aboard Progress M-40 at 04:14 UTC on 25 October 1998, along with supplies for Mir and the Znamya-2.5 reflector experiment. A Soyuz-U carrier rocket placed the spacecraft into orbit, flying from Site 1/5 at the Baikonur Cosmodrome in Kazakhstan: the same launch pad used by Sputnik 1. Progress M-40 docked to Mir on 27 October, and the satellite was transferred to the space station. At about 19:30 UTC on 10 November, during an extra-vehicular activity, Sputnik 41 was deployed by cosmonauts Gennady Padalka and Sergei Avdeyev.

On 24 November, a fortnight after deployment, Sputnik 41 was in a low Earth orbit with a perigee of 339 kilometres (211 mi), an apogee of 352 kilometres (219 mi), an inclination of 51.6 degrees, and a period of 91.44 minutes. The satellite was given the International Designator 1998-062C and was catalogued by the United States Space Command as 25533. Having ceased operations on 11 December 1998 after its batteries expired, Sputnik 41 decayed from orbit on 11 January 1999.

Sputnik 41 was originally intended to be built aboard Mir, based on a satellite launched in October 1997 as a backup for Sputnik 40. That spacecraft had been stored aboard the space station for a year after the successful deployment of Sputnik 40, and it was intended that it would be fitted with upgraded electronics and deployed. By the time of launch, the project had grown to involve a complete satellite, and the Sputnik 40 backup was never deployed.
