= Vladimir Syromyatnikov =

Russian scientist

Vladimir Sergeevich Syromyatnikov (Russian: Владимир Сергеевич Сыромятников; 7 January 1933 – 19 September 2006) was a Russian engineer and designer in the former Soviet space program. His notable designs including the docking mechanisms for crewed spacecraft; it was his Androgynous Peripheral Attach System which, in the 1970s, linked the Soviet and American space capsules in the Apollo-Soyuz test flight.

Syromyatnikov also helped design and develop Vostok, the world's first crewed spacecraft, which launched Yuri Gagarin into space in 1961.

== Shuttle-Mir ==
In the 1990s, following the fall of the Soviet Union, he updated the design of his docking mechanism for the meeting of the Mir space station and the Atlantis Space Shuttle. Syromyatnikov's designs are still used by spacecraft visiting the International Space Station.

== Znamya ==
Having failed to get support for a solar sail program in the mid-1980's, Syromyatnikov pivoted to use the technology as a space mirror. Two prototype Znamya space mirrors were deployed aboard Progress spacecraft in 1993 and 1999 respectively, however due to the latter's failure, the program was abandoned.

== See also ==
- Apollo–Soyuz Test Project
- Shuttle-Mir Program
- Project Znamya
