= Progress M-14 =

Russian uncrewed cargo spacecraft

- A Progress-M spacecraft
- Mission type: Mir resupply
- COSPAR ID: 1992-055A
- SATCAT no.: 22090

Spacecraft properties
- Spacecraft: Progress M-14 (No.209)
- Spacecraft type: Progress-M-VDU 11F615A55
- Manufacturer: NPO Energia

Start of mission
- Launch date: 15 August 1992, 22:18:32 UTC
- Rocket: Soyuz-U2
- Launch site: Baikonur 31/6

End of mission
- Disposal: Deorbited
- Decay date: 21 October 1992, 23:12:00 GMT

Orbital parameters
- Reference system: Geocentric
- Regime: Low Earth
- Perigee altitude: 187 kilometres (116 mi)
- Apogee altitude: 221 kilometres (137 mi)
- Inclination: 51.5 degrees
- Period: 88.6 minutes

Docking with Mir
- Docking port: Kvant-1 Aft
- Docking date: 18 August 1992, 00:20:48 UTC
- Undocking date: 21 October 1992, 16:46:01 UTC
- Time docked: 64.68 days

Progress M-14 (Russian: Прогресс M-14), was a Russian uncrewed Progress cargo spacecraft which was launched in 1992 to resupply the Mir space station. The spacecraft was modified to transport the first VDU propulsion unit to Mir. Progress M-14 also carried the sixth VBK-Raduga capsule, which was recovered after the flight.

== Launch ==
Progress M-14 launched on 15 August 1992 from the Baikonur Cosmodrome in Kazakhstan. It used a Soyuz-U2 rocket.

== Docking ==
Progress M-14 docked with Mir on 18 August 1992 at 00:20:48 GMT.

== See also ==
- 1992 in spaceflight
- List of Progress flights
- List of uncrewed spaceflights to Mir
