= Lowell Wood =

American astrophysicist (born 1941)

Lowell Lincoln Wood Jr. (born 1941) is an American astrophysicist who has been involved with the Strategic Defense Initiative and with geoengineering studies. He has been affiliated with Lawrence Livermore National Laboratory and the Hoover Institution, and chaired the EMP Commission. Wood is a prolific inventor listed on 1,813 U.S. patents as of May 27, 2025. Wood passed Thomas Edison on June 30, 2015, becoming the all-time most prolific patenter from the United States based on number of issued U.S. utility patents.

Wood earned a PhD in geophysics from the University of California at Los Angeles in 1965 for thesis titled Hyperthermal Processes in the Solar Atmosphere. He currently works for Intellectual Ventures.

== Political work ==
Wood meets and consults with global think tanks on global warming. He has suggested anti-global warming measures, including space mirrors, carbon sequestration in the ocean, employing stratospheric sulfate aerosols, and super-efficient nuclear reactors. Through Intellectual Ventures, he consults for Bill Gates and the Bill & Melinda Gates Foundation in support of their global vaccination program and other humanitarian projects.

== Awards and honors ==
In 1981, he received the U.S. Department of Energy's Ernest Orlando Lawrence Award "for his outstanding contributions to national security in the areas of directed energy, inertial confinement fusion, underwater communications, nuclear weapon design concepts, and computer technology." In 1997, he received the Golden Plate Award of the American Academy of Achievement.
