= Progress M-12 =

Russian cargo spacecraft

- Mission type: Mir resupply
- COSPAR ID: 1992-022A
- SATCAT no.: 21946

Spacecraft properties
- Spacecraft type: Progress-M 11F615A55
- Manufacturer: NPO Energia
- Launch mass: 7,250 kilograms (15,980 lb)

Start of mission
- Launch date: 19 April 1992, 21:29:25 UTC
- Rocket: Soyuz-U2
- Launch site: Baikonur Site 1/5

End of mission
- Disposal: Deorbited
- Decay date: 27 June 1992, 00:02:51 UTC

Orbital parameters
- Reference system: Geocentric
- Regime: Low Earth
- Perigee altitude: 371 kilometres (231 mi)
- Apogee altitude: 415 kilometres (258 mi)
- Inclination: 51.6 degrees

Docking with Mir
- Docking port: Core Forward
- Docking date: 21 April 1992, 23:21:59 UTC
- Undocking date: 27 June 1992, 21:34:44 UTC
- Time docked: 67 days

Progress M-12 (Russian: Прогресс М-12) was a Russian uncrewed cargo spacecraft which was launched in 1992 to resupply the Mir space station. The thirtieth of sixty four Progress spacecraft to visit Mir, it used the Progress-M 11F615A55 configuration, and had the serial number 213. It carried supplies including food, water and oxygen for the EO-11 crew aboard Mir, as well as equipment for conducting scientific research, and fuel for adjusting the station's orbit and performing manoeuvres.

Progress M-12 was launched at 21:29:25 GMT on 19 April 1992, atop a Soyuz-U2 carrier rocket flying from Site 1/5 at the Baikonur Cosmodrome. Following two days of free flight, it docked with the Forward port of the core module of Mir at 23:21:59 GMT on 21 April. During the 67 days for which Progress M-12 was docked, Mir was in an orbit of around 371 by 415 kilometres (200 by 224 nmi), inclined at 51.6 degrees. Progress M-12 undocked from Mir at 21:34:44 GMT on 27 June, and was deorbited few hours later, to a destructive reentry over the Pacific Ocean at around 00:02:51 the next day.

== See also ==
- 1992 in spaceflight
- List of Progress flights
- List of uncrewed spaceflights to Mir
