= Progress M-11 =

Russian uncrewed cargo spacecraft

- Mission type: Mir resupply
- COSPAR ID: 1992-004A
- SATCAT no.: 21851

Spacecraft properties
- Spacecraft type: Progress-M 11F615A55
- Manufacturer: NPO Energia
- Launch mass: 7,250 kilograms (15,980 lb)

Start of mission
- Launch date: 25 January 1992, 07:50:16 UTC
- Rocket: Soyuz-U2
- Launch site: Baikonur Site 1/5

End of mission
- Disposal: Deorbited
- Decay date: 13 March 1992, 15:47 UTC

Orbital parameters
- Reference system: Geocentric
- Regime: Low Earth
- Perigee altitude: 375 kilometres (233 mi)
- Apogee altitude: 393 kilometres (244 mi)
- Inclination: 51.6 degrees

Docking with Mir
- Docking port: Core Forward
- Docking date: 27 January 1992, 09:30:43 UTC
- Undocking date: 13 March 1992, 08:43:40 UTC
- Time docked: 46 days

Progress M-11 (Russian: Прогресс М-11) was a Russian uncrewed cargo spacecraft which was launched in 1992 to resupply the Mir space station. The twenty-ninth of sixty four Progress spacecraft to visit Mir, it used the Progress-M 11F615A55 configuration, and had the serial number 212. It carried supplies including food, water and oxygen for the EO-10 crew aboard Mir, as well as equipment for conducting scientific research, and fuel for adjusting the station's orbit and performing manoeuvres. It was the first spacecraft to visit Mir following the dissolution of the Soviet Union.

Progress M-11 was launched at 07:50:16 GMT on 25 January 1992, atop a Soyuz-U2 carrier rocket flying from Site 1/5 at the Baikonur Cosmodrome. Following two days of free flight, it docked with the Forward port of Mir's core module at 09:30:43 GMT on 27 January.

During the 46 days for which Progress M-11 was docked, Mir was in an orbit of around 375 by 393 kilometres (202 by 212 nmi), inclined at 51.6 degrees. Progress M-11 undocked from Mir at 08:43:40 GMT on 13 March, and was deorbited few hours later, to a destructive reentry over the Pacific Ocean at around 15:47.

== See also ==
- 1992 in spaceflight
- List of Progress flights
- List of uncrewed spaceflights to Mir
