= Progress M-13 =

Russian uncrewed cargo spacecraft

- Mission type: Mir resupply
- COSPAR ID: 1992-035A
- SATCAT no.: 22004

Spacecraft properties
- Spacecraft type: Progress-M 11F615A55
- Manufacturer: NPO Energia
- Launch mass: 7,250 kilograms (15,980 lb)

Start of mission
- Launch date: 30 June 1992, 16:43:13 UTC
- Rocket: Soyuz-U2
- Launch site: Baikonur Site 31/6

End of mission
- Disposal: Deorbited
- Decay date: 24 July 1992, 08:03:35 UTC

Orbital parameters
- Reference system: Geocentric
- Regime: Low Earth
- Perigee altitude: 387 kilometres (240 mi)
- Apogee altitude: 410 kilometres (250 mi)
- Inclination: 51.6 degrees

Docking with Mir
- Docking port: Core Forward
- Docking date: 4 July 1992, 12:38 UTC
- Undocking date: 24 July 1992, 04:14:00 UTC
- Time docked: 19 days

Progress M-13 (Russian: Прогресс М-13) was a Russian uncrewed cargo spacecraft which was launched in 1992 to resupply the Mir space station. The thirty-first of sixty four Progress spacecraft to visit Mir, it used the Progress-M 11F615A55 configuration, and had the serial number 214. It carried supplies including food, water and oxygen for the EO-11 crew aboard Mir, as well as equipment for conducting scientific research, and fuel for adjusting the station's orbit and performing manoeuvres.

Progress M-13 was launched at 16:43:13 GMT on 30 June 1992, atop a Soyuz-U2 carrier rocket flying from Site 31/6 at the Baikonur Cosmodrome. Following four days of free flight, it docked with the Forward port of Mir's core module at 12:38 GMT on 4 July. An earlier docking attempt on 2 July had been unsuccessful. During the 19 days for which Progress M-13 was docked, Mir was in an orbit of around 387 by 410 kilometres (209 by 221 nmi), inclined at 51.6 degrees. Progress M-13 undocked from Mir at 04:14:00 GMT on 24 July to make way for Soyuz TM-15, and was deorbited few hours later, to a destructive reentry over the Pacific Ocean at around 08:03:35.

== See also ==
- 1992 in spaceflight
- List of Progress missions
- List of uncrewed spaceflights to Mir
