= Adam Candeub =

American lawyer (born 1967/1968)

Acting Assistant Secretary of Commerce for Communications and Information
- In office August 2020 – December 2020
- President: Donald Trump
- Preceded by: Diane Rinaldo (acting)
- Succeeded by: Evelyn Remaley (acting)

Personal details
- Born: 1967 or 1968 (age 57–58)
- Spouse: Julie Taiber (m. 1999)
- Children: 1
- Education: Yale University (BA); University of Pennsylvania (JD)

Adam Candeub (born 1967 or 1968) is an American lawyer.

== Early life and education ==
Adam Candeub was born in 1967 or 1968. Candeub is the son of Leon and Helene Candeub. Helene was a social studies teacher, while Leon was an optometrist and the director of continuing education at the Pennsylvania College of Optometry. He attended Abington Senior High School. Candeub graduated magna cum laude from Yale University and from the University of Pennsylvania Law School.

== Career ==
=== Legal work (1992–2004) ===
By 1999, Candeub was an associate at Jones Day's office in Washington, D.C. That year, he was married to Julie Taiber; they had one child.

=== Michigan State University (2004–2020; 2023–2025) ===
In 2004, Candeub became a professor at the Michigan State University College of Law.

=== Deputy assistant attorney general (2020–2021) ===
In 2020, several officials within the first Trump administration attempted to appoint Candeub as the assistant attorney general for the Department of Justice Antitrust Division. The move was blocked by Attorney General William Barr, believing that he did not have enough experience.

=== General counsel of the Federal Communications Commission (2025–present) ===
In February 2025, Semafor reported that Candeub had been named as the general counsel of the Federal Communications Commission.

=== Political activities ===
Candeub authored the final section of the Mandate for Leadership attached to Project 2025. He called for the Federal Trade Commission to establish a task force to investigate corporate environmental, social, and governance and diversity, equity, and inclusion policies, arguing that a company should pursue profits, not social advocacy. Candeub additionally stated that the commission should regulate large social media companies and that state attorneys general should object to corporate mergers.

== Assistant Attorney General for the Antitrust Division ==
In June 2026, Bloomberg News reported that President Donald Trump was set to name Candeub as his nominee to serve as the assistant attorney general for the Department of Justice Antitrust Division.

== Views ==
In 2024, Candeub criticized the National Institutes of Health's discouragement of research advancing scientific racism, comparing it to the persecution of Galileo.
