= Soletta 750 =

1956 Swiss prototype automobile

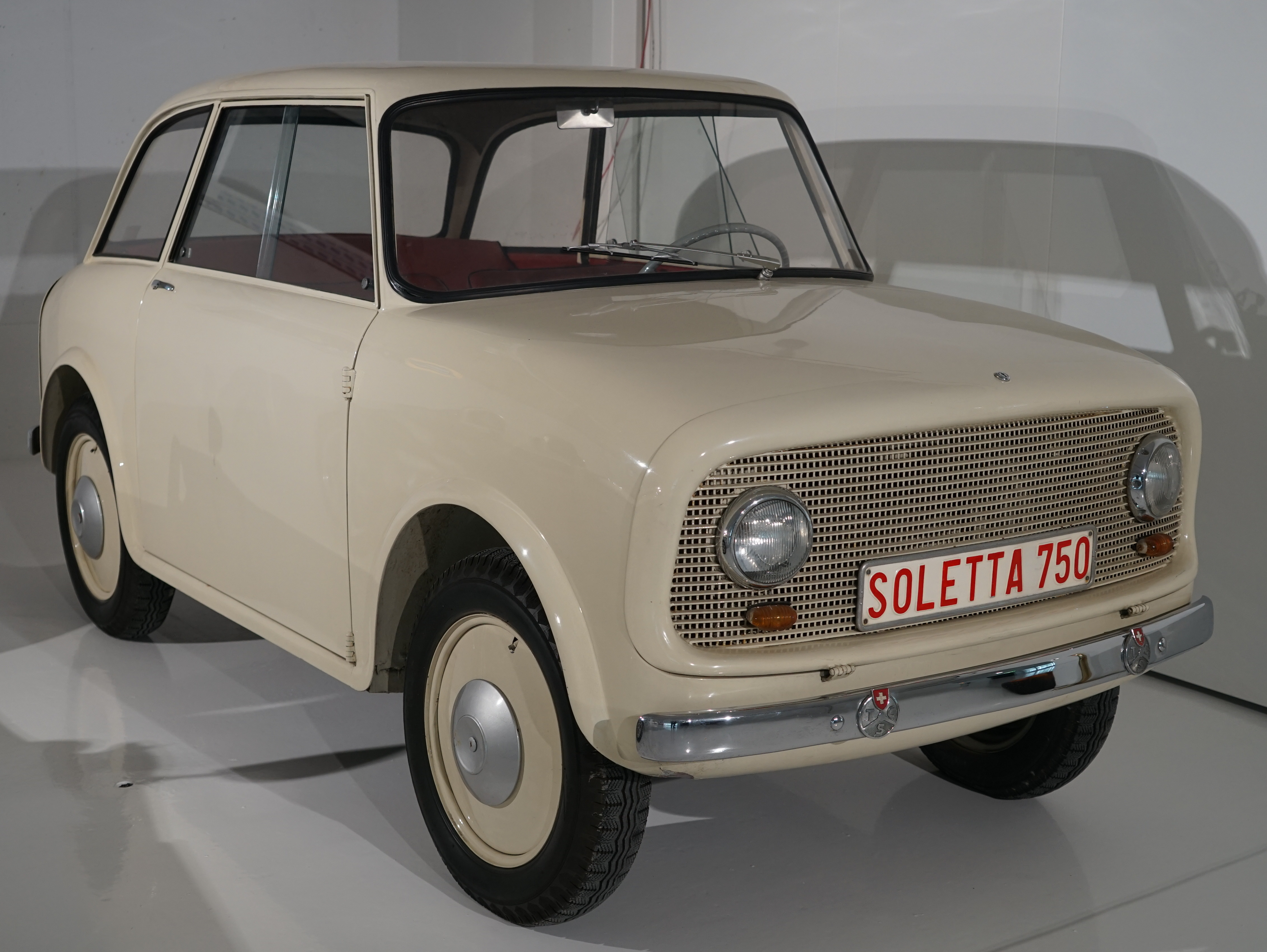

Overview
- Production: 1956
- Designer: Willy Ernst Salzmann

Body and chassis
- Body style: 2-door sedan
- Layout: M/R

Powertrain
- Engine: 750 cc air cooled flat-twin
- Transmission: 3-speed manual

Dimensions
- Wheelbase: 2,000 mm (78.7 in)
- Length: 3,150 mm (124.0 in)
- Width: 1,350 mm (53.1 in)
- Height: 1,380 mm (54.3 in)
- Kerb weight: 500 kg (1,102 lb)

The Soletta 750 is the first ever Swiss-built concept car. It was also the first car both designed and built in Switzerland in the post-World War II (WWII) period. The Soletta 750 debuted in 1956. Only one was ever made, primarily to demonstrate a new type of automobile suspension system.

== History ==
Willy Ernst Salzmann was an engineer and graduate of the Eidgenössische Technische Hochschule Zürich (ETH Zurich — Swiss Federal Institute of Technology, Zurich). While still a student he designed a sophisticated three-wheel vehicle. After graduating he ran his own engineering design company, the Ingenieurbureau für Fahrzeugbau (Engineering Office for Vehicle Construction), based in Solothurn, Switzerland. He made a name for himself and his company by designing equipment for Ford and Ferguson tractors.

Salzmann designed a new type of rear automobile suspension system called the Zweigelenk-Elastikachse Salzmann (Salzmann two-joint elastic axle). Key features of the suspension were a fixed or semi-fixed differential with swing axle half-shafts and coil springs, with the half-shafts connected by a transverse member slung under the differential and attached to the shafts with rubber springs.

Salzmann wanted to display his new suspension at the Geneva Motor Show but was told that the main hall was reserved for complete cars, and that he would be restricted to the space for parts and accessories. Salzmann decided to build a car around his new suspension design so that it could appear in the main hall.

While some sources say that the car was built in just six weeks, others point out that its appearance at Geneva was announced in 1955, indicating that the design work likely started much earlier.

The body was manufactured by the Carrosserie Hess in Bellach.

"Soletta" is the Italian name for the town of Solothurn.

The Soletta 750 debuted at the 1956 Geneva Motor Show. It appeared later that same year at the Paris Motor Show with revised bodywork. The reaction of the international press to the car was surprised but generally positive. The Soletta 750 was viewed by Sir Alec Issigonis, future designer of the Mini, at the 1956 Paris Show. He remarked that there was a market for four-place concepts like the Soletta 750.

Renault, Alfa Romeo, and a government agency in the German Democratic Republic (GDR) all expressed interest in the project, but this did not lead to series production.

The Soletta 750 appeared at a special exhibition in Wangen an der Aare in 2009. In 2018 the car again appeared at the Geneva Motor Show as part of the "Le Retour du Futur" (The Return of the Future) exhibit. The car is now owned by the Swiss Car Register and was displayed at the Pantheon Basel in Muttenz and in 2020 at the Verkehrshaus Luzern. Since November 2023 the car is displayed at the Enter Technikwelt Solothurn in Derendingen SO.

Salzmann later designed a compact four cylinder "X-Boxer" engine meant for the car. In the following years he developed another innovative engine with combined piston and connecting rods and continued to experiment with microcars into the 1990s.

== Features ==
The Soletta 750 is a two-door, four-seat sedan. Due to its small size, it can be considered a subcompact car, or even a microcar.

Much of the body is plastic, while the door skins are steel. To simplify production and reduce costs, complementary body panels, such as the doors on the right and left, the front "grille" and rear "tailgate" covers, and diagonally opposite fenders, are interchangeable. This symmetry means that the driver's side door is hinged on the B-pillar and opens towards the back of the car, while the passenger's side door is hinged on the A-pillar and opens towards the front.

The Soletta 750 is built on a platform chassis with an upper steel tube framework. The front suspension is independent with upper and lower A-arms and coil springs. Some parts are said to be from the Renault 4, with the front suspension and the chassis possibly coming from the French car.

The engine is an air cooled flat-twin displacing a little under 750 cc. It was built by Condor-Werke AG of Courfaivre, who used it in their shaft-driven A750 military motorcycle, a large displacement version of the A580 model whose design was strongly influenced by German bikes from makes such as BMW and Zundapp.

This former motorcycle engine is located under the rear seat and drives the rear wheels via a three-speed gearbox. Engine, transmission, and differential together form a single powertrain swing-arm assembly meant to improve ride quality and simplify maintenance.

== Technical data ==
Soletta 750	Detail
Engine:	Flat-twin engine
Displacement:	745 cc (45.46 cu in)
Bore × Stroke:	78 mm × 78 mm (3.07 in × 3.07 in)
Maximum power:	22.3 PS (16.4 kW) at 4200 rpm
Maximum torque:	43 N⋅m (32 ft⋅lb) at 2500 rpm
Compression ratio:	6.3:1
Valvetrain:	Side valve engine, 2 valves per cylinder
Induction:	2 Oensingen carburettors
Cooling:	Air-cooled
Transmission:	3-speed manual
Brakes f/r:	Drum/drum
Suspension front:	Upper and lower wishbones, coil springs
Suspension rear:	Salzmann two-joint elastic axle
Body/Chassis:	Plastic body with steel doors, steel platform chassis with tubular steel superstructure
Track f/r:	1,150 / 1,150 mm (45.3 / 45.3 in)
Wheelbase:	2,000 mm (78.7 in)
Tires f/r:	135 × 400 / 135 × 400
Length; Width; Height:	3,150 mm (124.0 in); 1,350 mm (53.1 in); 1,380 mm (54.3 in)
Ground clearance:	180 mm (7.1 in)
Weight:	500 kg (1,102.3 lb)
Maximum speed:	106 km/h (66 mph)
Fuel economy:	3.9 L/100 km (60 mpg_{‑US})

== Gallery ==
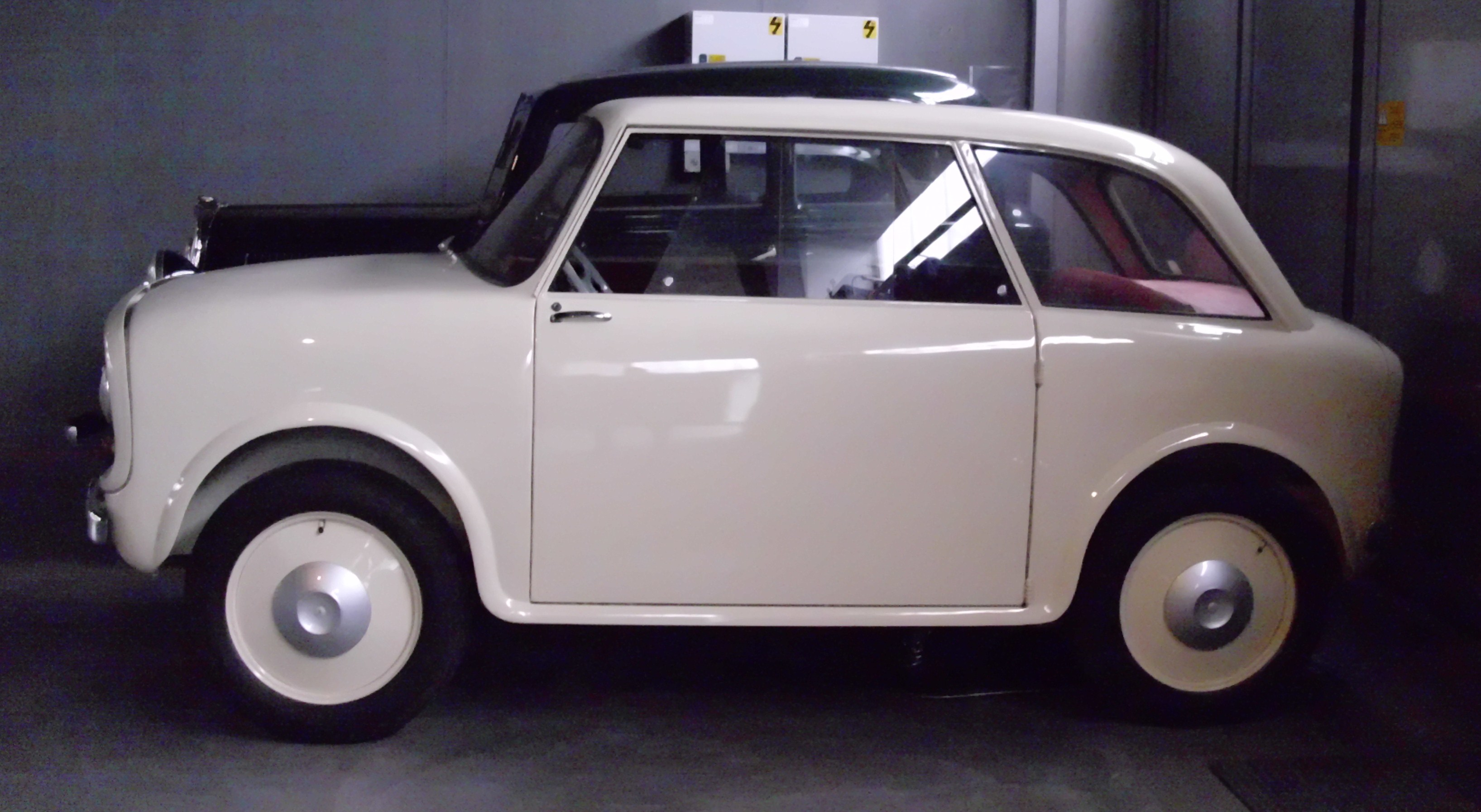

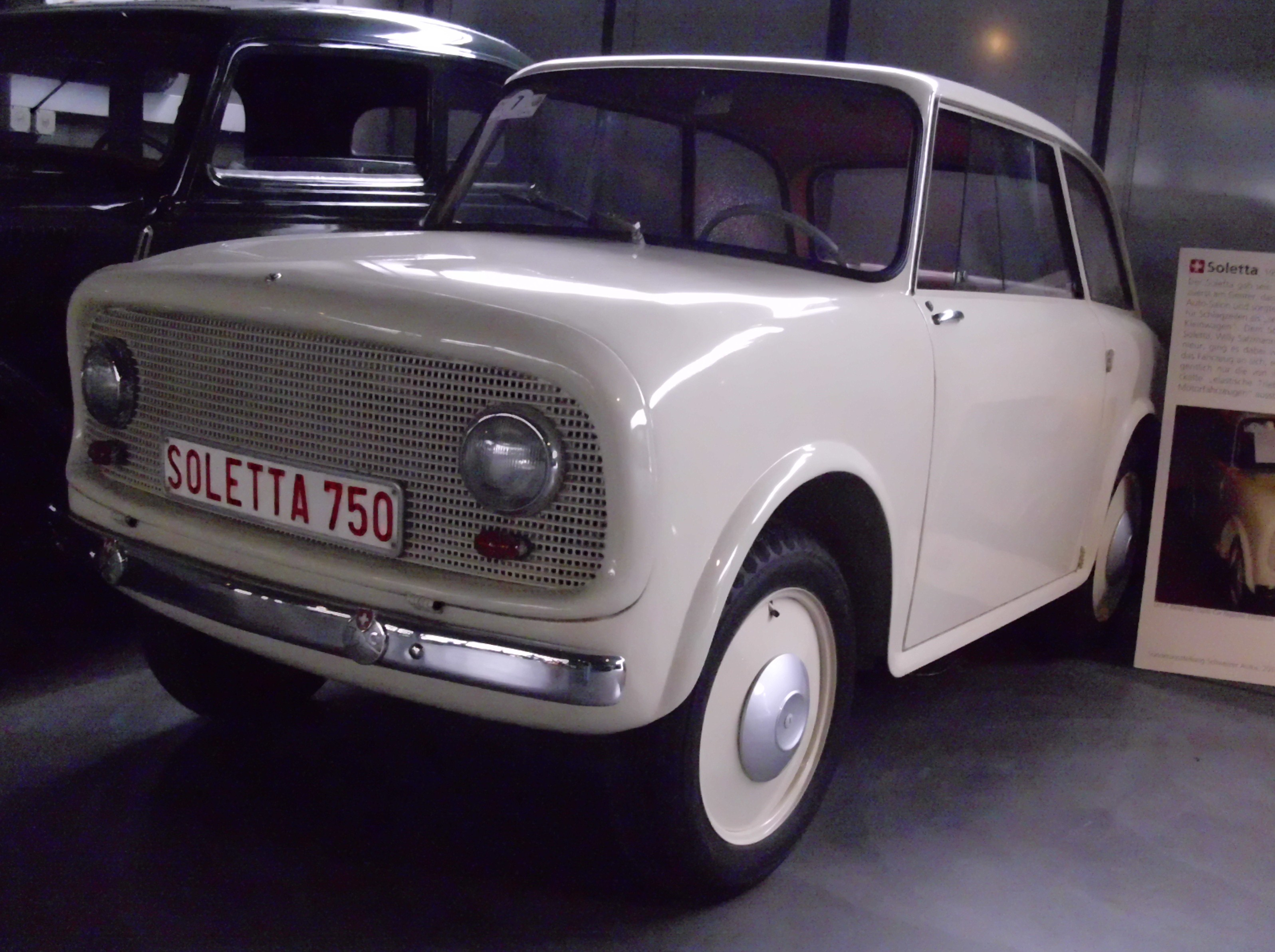

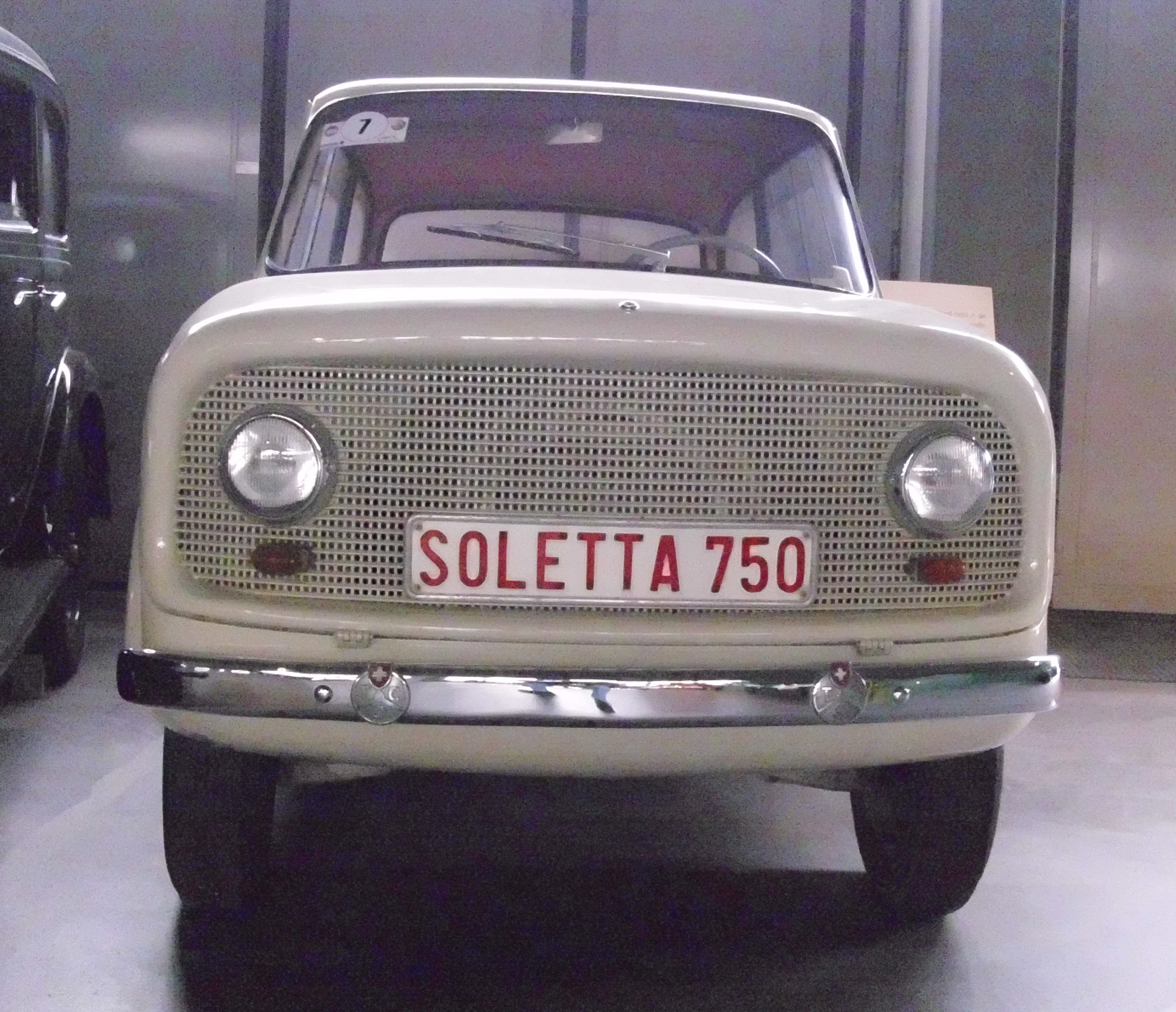

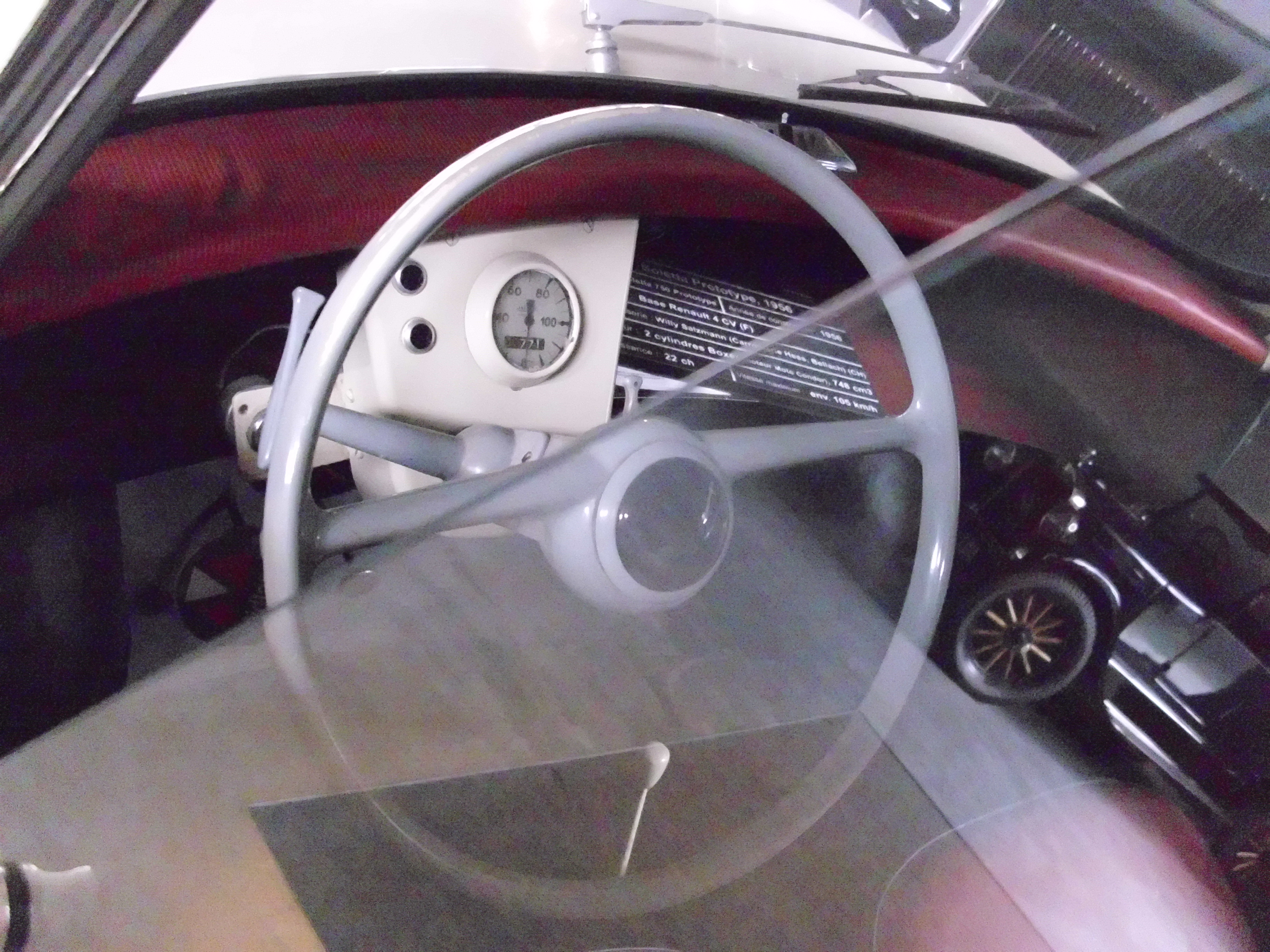
