= Progress M-15 =

Russian uncrewed cargo spacecraft

- Mission type: Mir resupply
- COSPAR ID: 1992-071A
- SATCAT no.: 22203

Spacecraft properties
- Spacecraft type: Progress-M 11F615A55
- Manufacturer: NPO Energia
- Launch mass: 7,250 kilograms (15,980 lb)

Start of mission
- Launch date: 27 October 1992, 17:19:41 UTC
- Rocket: Soyuz-U2
- Launch site: Baikonur Site 31/6

End of mission
- Disposal: Deorbited
- Decay date: 7 February 1993, 08:03:35 UTC

Orbital parameters
- Reference system: Geocentric
- Regime: Low Earth
- Perigee altitude: 396 kilometres (246 mi)
- Apogee altitude: 399 kilometres (248 mi)
- Inclination: 51.6 degrees

Docking with Mir
- Docking port: Kvant-1 Aft
- Docking date: 29 October 1992, 17:19:41 UTC
- Undocking date: 4 February 1993, 00:44:53 UTC
- Time docked: 97 days

Progress M-15 (Russian: Прогресс М-15) was a Russian uncrewed cargo spacecraft which was launched in 1992 to resupply the Mir space station. The thirty-third of sixty-four Progress spacecraft to visit Mir, it used the Progress-M 11F615A55 configuration, and had the serial number 215. It carried supplies including food, water and oxygen for the EO-12 crew aboard Mir, as well as equipment for conducting scientific research, and fuel for adjusting the station's orbit and performing manoeuvres. It also transported the Mak 2 satellite, which was deployed from Mir on 20 November. TORU manual docking system was first tested in this mission.

Progress M-15 was launched at 17:19:41 GMT on 27 October 1992, atop a Soyuz-U2 carrier rocket flying from Site 31/6 at the Baikonur Cosmodrome. Following two days of free flight, it docked with the aft port of the Kvant-1 module at 17:19:41 GMT on 29 October.

During the 97 days for which Progress M-15 was docked, Mir was in an orbit of around 396 by 399 kilometres (214 by 215 nmi), inclined at 51.6 degrees. Progress M-15 undocked from Mir at 00:44:53 GMT on 4 February 1993, however it remained in orbit to conduct the Znamya 2 experiment, and research into autonomous flight. It was deorbited on 7 February, and burned up during reentry over the Pacific Ocean at around 08:03:35 GMT.

== See also ==
- 1992 in spaceflight
- 1993 in spaceflight
- List of Progress flights
- List of uncrewed spaceflights to Mir
