= Space mirror =

Artificial satellites designed to change the amount of solar radiation that impacts Earth

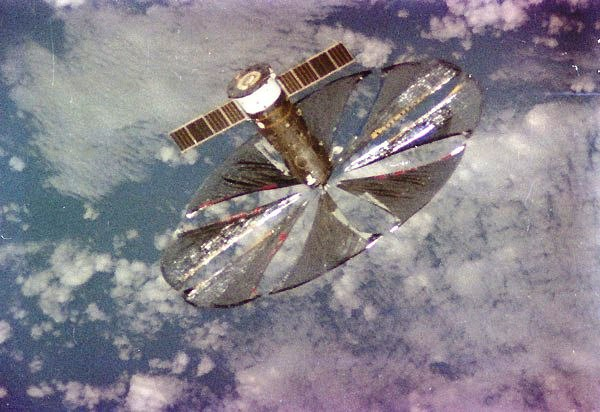
Znamya-2, which was deployed as part of a series of orbital space mirror experiments in the 1990s by Russia.

Solar mirrors in space can be used to change the amount of sunlight that reaches the Earth. The concept was first theorised in 1923 by physicist Hermann Oberth and later developed in the 1980s by other scientists. Space mirrors can be used to increase or decrease the amount of solar energy that reaches a specific point of the earth for various purposes.

There have been several proposed implementations of the space mirror concept but none have been implemented thus far other than the Znamya experiment by Russia, due to logistical concerns and challenges of deployment. Znamya successfully tested reflecting more sunlight to Earth.

== Oberth's proposal ==
In 1923, Hermann Oberth proposed the construction of space mirrors with a diameter of 100 to 300 km in his book "Die Rakete zu den Planetenräumen". Oberth wrote that a mirror of 100 km diameter "could make broad stretches of land in the north habitable by using diffused light to heat, and in our latitudes it could prevent the feared spring freezes (ice men) in addition to night frosts in the spring and autumn, thereby saving the fruit and vegetable harvests of entire countries."

Oberth's 1929 book "Wege zur Raumschiffahrt" (Ways to Spaceflight) expanded on this proposal, giving further details of a reflector constructed of facets of 5 µm thick sodium metal, steerable by electrostatic repulsion. The facets would be held in place by a rotating wire net.

He warned of the military applications of such mirrors: "munitions factories can be exploded with it, tornadoes and thunderstorms produced, marching troops and their reserves destroyed, whole cities burned, and generally the greatest of damage done." Oberth estimated that such a reflector would cost only 3 billion Reichsmark and take 15 years to build.

Oberth continued to promote his space mirror idea in books published in 1957 and 1978. Since the high cost of spaceflight was by then apparent, Oberth proposed that components should be produced from lunar minerals on the Moon, because its lower gravitational pull requires less energy to launch the components into lunar orbit. In addition, the earth's atmosphere is not burdened by many rocket launches. From the lunar surface, the components would be launched into the lunar orbit by an electromagnetic lunar slingshot and "stacked" at a 60° libration point. From there, the components could be transported into orbit with the electric spaceships he had designed with little recoil, and there they would be assembled into mirrors with a diameter of 100 to 300 km. In 1978 he estimated that the realization could be expected between 2018 and 2038.

=== Mirror distance and spot size ===
Oberth remarked that "it is impossible to concentrate the light of a 100,000 km-wide reflector on the space of one hectare, as Gail describes it in his novel, The Stone from the Moon". Assuming a small (<10 km) mirror, the spot size is limited by:

$\frac{d}{a} > \frac{D}{A}$

where d is the diameter of the spot of light on the Earth, a is the distance from the mirror to the Earth, D is the diameter of the Sun, and A is the distance from the mirror to the Sun. This is independent of the size or shape of the mirror.

For example, a mirror orbiting at 625 km, as proposed by Reflect Orbital, cannot produce a spot smaller than about 2.9 km.

== Sunshades ==
Since 1989, concern about global warming has led scientists to propose various space structures that would reduce the amount of sunlight reaching the Earth, termed geoengineering or solar radiation modification. Some of these proposals use mirrors, either as a solar sail or to provide heat and light as an additional benefit.

Lowell Wood, a researcher at the Lawrence Livermore National Laboratory, proposed sending a single, massive mirror into orbit at Lagrange point L1, approximately one million miles away from Earth. The space mirror would be able to remain in orbit without any additional energy supplies and continue to block sunlight. In 2006, Roger Angel, a researcher at the University of Arizona, proposed sending millions of smaller space mirrors as opposed to one large mirror to reduce costs and increase feasibility as a single mirror would need to be approximately 600,000 square miles to block just one percent of sunlight.

In 2002, Jerome Pearson at STAR Technology and Research proposed using a network of steerable space mirrors "to form a broad, flat ring like those of Saturn". The proposal, updated in 2006, would require about 5 billion kilograms (1.1×10^{10} lb) of spacecraft mass costing an estimated $125–500 billion. This would reduce the global temperature by an estimated 1.63K, and would additionally provide controllable evening illumination.

Climate experts have cautioned that geoengineering proposals like space mirrors, while potentially being able to cool the planet, would not provide any benefit for other climate related problems like high acidity levels in the ocean due to the build up of carbon. In the past, many scientists have also resisted the idea of using geoengineering to curb climate change, as the risks of causing adverse effects were too great and they worried it would encourage people to continue to use fossil fuels that contribute to that change.

== Znamya ==
The first practical attempt at reflecting sunlight was made in the 1990s by the Russian Federal Space Agency under project Znamya. Intended to provide lighting during Russia's long winter nights, it consisted of three experiments: the Znamya 1, Znamya 2 experiment, and the failed Znamya 2.5.

The Znamya 1 was a ground experiment that never was launched.

The Znamya 2 was launched into a suborbital trajectory in 1992. It was a 20-metre (66 ft) circular mirror. For several hours, it provided a bright light of a width of 5km and with the luminosity of a full moon.

The Znamya 2.5 was a 25-metre (82 ft) mirror which was launched into orbit in 1999 but failed during deployment. Znamya 3 would have been a 60–70 metre mirror, but the project was canceled.

== Reflect Orbital ==
Reflect Orbital was founded in 2021 with the goal of deploying a constellation of steerable mirror satellites for solar power and on-demand lighting.

In June 2025, the Air Force Research Laboratory and AFWERX awarded Reflect Orbital a US$1.25 million Phase II Small Business Innovation Research (SBIR) contract to develop space mirror technology. The company is developing an 18 meter by 18 meter (59 ft) deployable mirror weighing 16 kg (35 lbs) made from mylar plastic and has announced plans to demonstrate active pointing control from sun synchronous orbit for the first time in 2026.

On July 9, 2026, the Federal Communications Commission granted a license for the first satellite.

Astronomers are concerned that a constellation of bright orbiting objects will interfere with observational astronomy. A recent detailed study launched by the European Southern Observatory concluded that such mirrors would compromise observation considerably and may even invalidate observatories such as the Vera Rubin Observatory completely.

== See also ==
- Planetary engineering
- Space-based solar power
- Sun gun
