= Solar mirror =

Type of mirror designed for sunlight

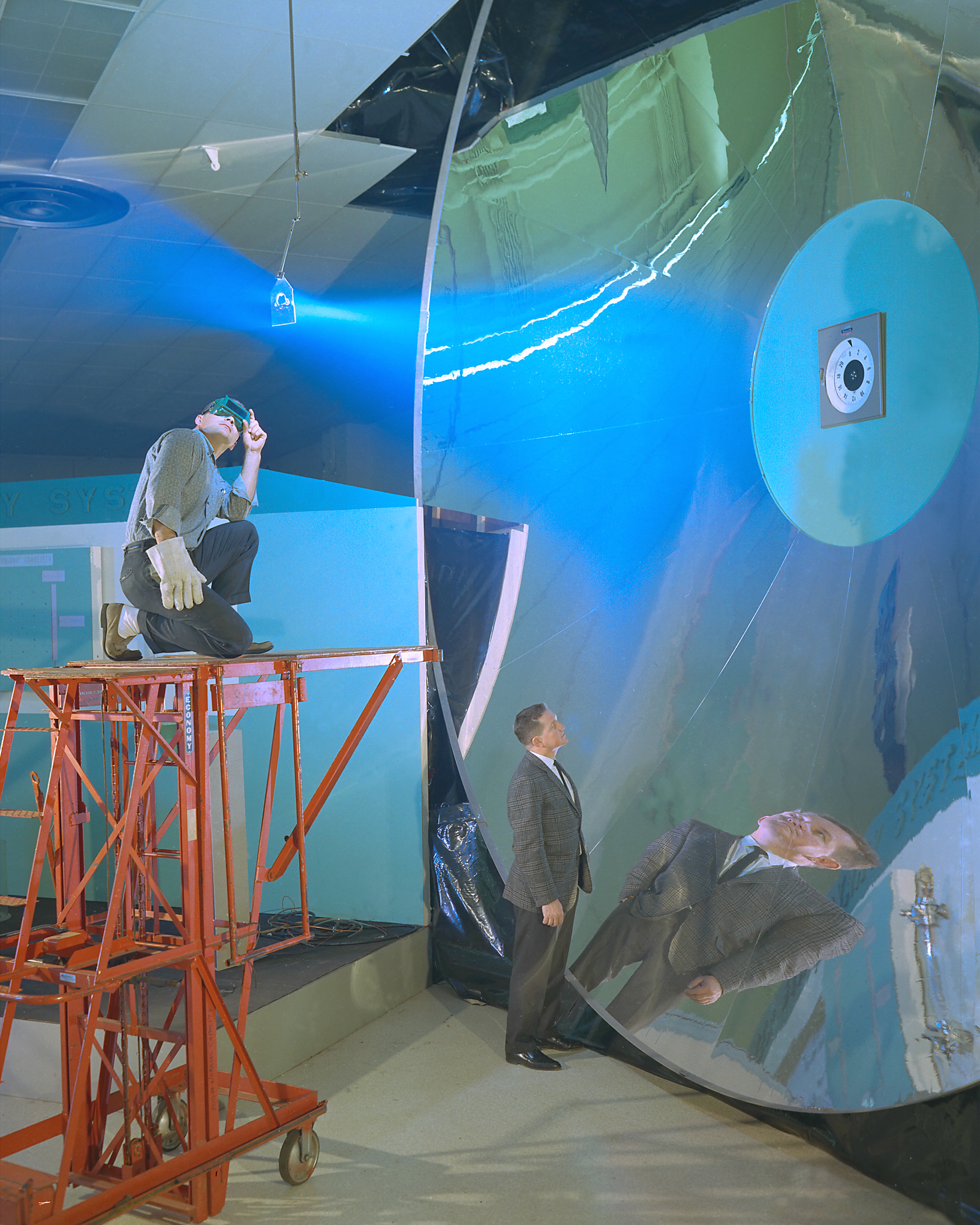
A solar mirror in the Solar Collector Laboratory at Lewis Research Center, November 1966

A solar mirror contains a substrate with a reflective layer for reflecting the solar energy, and in most cases an interference layer. This may be a planar mirror or parabolic arrays of solar mirrors used to achieve a substantially concentrated reflection factor for solar energy systems.

See article "Heliostat" for more information on solar mirrors used for terrestrial energy.

== Components ==
=== Glass or metal substrate ===
The substrate is the mechanical layer which holds the mirror in shape.

Glass may also be used as a protective layer to protect the other layers from abrasion and corrosion. Although glass is brittle, it is a good material for this purpose, because it is highly transparent (low optical losses), resistant to ultraviolet light (UV), fairly hard (abrasion resistant), chemically inert, and fairly easy to clean. It is composed of a float glass with high optical transmission characteristics in the visible and infrared ranges, and is configured to transmit visible light and infrared radiation. The top surface, known as the "first surface", will reflect some of the incident solar energy, due to the reflection coefficient caused by its index of refraction being higher than air. Most of the solar energy is transmitted through the glass substrate to the lower layers of the mirror, possibly with some refraction, depending on the angle of incidence as light enters the mirror.

Metal substrates ("Metal Mirror Reflectors") may also be used in solar reflectors. NASA Glenn Research Center, for example, used a mirror comprising a reflective aluminum surface on a metallic honeycomb as a prototype reflector unit for a proposed power system for the International Space Station. One technology uses aluminum composite reflector panels, achieving over 93% reflectivity and coated with a speciality coating for surface protection. Metal reflectors offer some advantages over glass reflectors, as they are lightweight and stronger than glass and relatively inexpensive. The ability to retain parabolic shape in reflectors is another advantage, and normally the subframe requirements are reduced by more than 300%. The top surface reflection coating allows for better efficiency.

=== Reflective layer ===
The reflective layer is designed to reflect the maximum amount of solar energy incident upon it, back through the glass substrate. The layer comprises a highly reflective thin metal film, usually either silver or aluminum, but occasionally other metals. Because of sensitivity to abrasion and corrosion, the metal layer is usually protected by the (glass) substrate on top, and the bottom may be covered with a protective coating, such as a copper layer and varnish.

Despite the use of aluminum in generic mirrors, aluminum is not always used as the reflective layer for a solar mirror. The use of silver as the reflective layer is claimed to lead to higher efficiency levels, because it is the most reflective metal. This is because of aluminum's reflection factor in the UV region of the spectrum. Locating the aluminum layer on the first surface exposes it to weathering, which reduces the mirror's resistance to corrosion and makes it more susceptible to abrasion. Adding a protective layer to the aluminum would reduce its reflectivity.

=== Interference layer ===
An interference layer may be located on the first surface of the glass substrate. It can be used to tailor the reflectance. It may also be designed for diffuse reflectance of near-ultraviolet radiation, in order to prevent it from passing through the glass substrate. This substantially enhances the overall reflection of near-ultraviolet radiation from the mirror. The interference layer may be made of several materials, depending on the desired refractive index, such as titanium dioxide.

== Passive mirror cooling applications ==
The use of solar mirrors as a form of passive daytime radiative cooling for solar radiation management has been proposed to address local temperature increases as well as to decrease global warming. Propositions have focused on the usage of solar mirrors both on the Earth's surface and in space.

=== Terrestrial applications ===
Passive mirror cooling systems reduce temperatures by reflecting solar radiation while shielding the base of the mirrors from heat penetration. The effectiveness of such systems may be reduced with the accumulation of dust on mirrors, with maximum dust accumulation reducing mirror effectiveness by 63%. However, mirrors may be "self-cleaned" by rain (reducing the soiling rate to 18.6%) or cleaned by humans.

On a local scale, passive mirror cooling systems have been implemented to lower the energy consumption used to cool residential and commercial buildings and thus offset the need for air-conditioning. When passive mirrored surfaces are placed on roofs, they have been shown to reduce electricity consumption and costs for cooling, with one case study reducing costs by 15%.

While the use of solar mirrors as a form of solar radiation management on a global scale has been proposed, more data and funding is required. Increasing awareness of passive radiative cooling's potential to lower costs as well as its role in reducing solar radiation may increase applications. Researchers who support passive mirror cooling applications on a mass scale, such as Ye Tao of MEER, argue that carbon dioxide removal alone will not work fast enough to prevent global temperature increases from surpassing life-threatening levels.

== Solar thermal applications ==
The intensity of solar thermal energy from solar radiation at the surface of the earth is about 1 kilowatt per square metre (0.093 kW/sq ft), of area normal to the direction of the sun, under clear-sky conditions. When solar energy is unconcentrated, the maximum collector temperature is about 80–100 °C (176–212 °F). This is useful for space heating and heating water. For higher temperature applications, such as cooking, or supplying a heat engine or turbine-electrical generator, this energy must be concentrated.

=== Terrestrial applications ===
Solar thermal systems have been constructed to produce concentrated solar power (CSP), for generating electricity. The large Sandia Lab solar power tower uses a Stirling engine heated by a solar mirror concentrator. Another configuration is the trough system.

=== Space power application ===
"Solar dynamic" energy systems have been proposed for various spacecraft applications, including solar power satellites, where a reflector focuses sunlight on to a heat engine such as the Brayton cycle type.

== Photovoltaic augmentation ==
Photovoltaic cells (PV) which can convert solar radiation directly into electricity are quite expensive per unit area. Some types of PV cell, e.g. gallium arsenide, if cooled, are capable of converting efficiently up to 1,000 times as much radiation as is normally provided by simple exposure to direct sunlight.

In tests done by Sewang Yoon and Vahan Garboushian, for Amonix Corp. silicon solar cell conversion efficiency is shown to increase at higher levels of concentration, proportional to the logarithm of the concentration, provided external cooling is available to the photocells. Similarly, higher efficiency multijunction cells also improve in performance with high concentration.

=== Terrestrial application ===
To date no large scale testing has been performed on this concept. Presumably this is because the increased cost of the reflectors and cooling generally is not economically justified.

=== Solar power satellite application ===
Theoretically, for space-based solar power satellite designs, solar mirrors could reduce PV cell costs and launch costs since they are expected to be both lighter and cheaper than equivalent large areas of PV cells. Several options were studied by Boeing corporation. In their Fig. 4. captioned "Architecture 4. GEO Harris Wheel", the authors describe a system of solar mirrors used to augment the power of some nearby solar collectors, from which the power is then transmitted to receiver stations on earth.

== Space reflectors for night illumination ==
Another advanced space concept proposal is the notion of space reflectors which reflect sunlight on to small spots on the night side of the Earth to provide night time illumination. An early proponent of this concept was Dr. Krafft Arnold Ehricke, who wrote about systems called "Lunetta", "Soletta", "Biosoletta" and "Powersoletta".

A preliminary series of experiments called Znamya ("Banner") was performed by Russia, using solar sail prototypes that had been repurposed as mirrors. Znamya-1 was a ground test. Znamya-2 was launched aboard the Progress M-15 resupply mission to the Mir space station on 27 October 1992. After undocked from Mir, the Progress deployed the reflector. This mission was successful in that the mirror deployed, although it did not illuminate the Earth. The next flight Znamya-2.5 failed. Znamya-3 never flew.

In 2018, Chengdu, China, announced plans to place three solar reflectors in orbit around the Earth in hopes of reducing the amount of electricity required to power streetlights. Skepticism has been voiced regarding the technological feasibility of the plan.

== See also ==
- Heliostat
- Parabolic trough
- Solar thermal collector
- Photovoltaics
- Passive solar
- Solar tracker
- Sun gun
