= Znamya (satellite) =

Russian orbital mirror experiments in the 1990s

Znamya Знамя
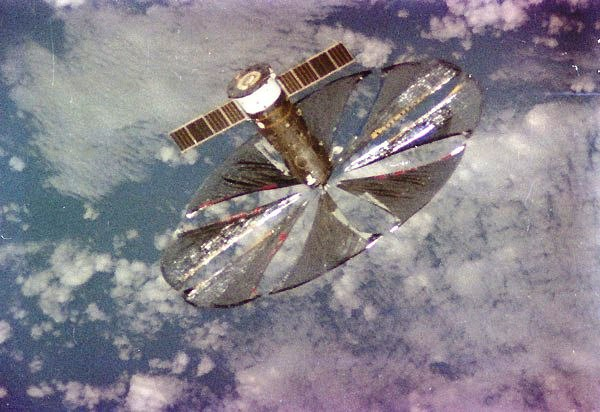
- Znamya satellite
- Mission type: Experiment
- Operator: Russian Federal Space Agency

Spacecraft properties
- Spacecraft: The Znamya project
- Dimensions: 20 m space solar mirror

Start of mission
- Launch date: October 27, 1992
- Rocket: Progress M-15
- Launch site: Baikonur
- Deployment date: February 4, 1993

End of mission
- Disposal: Atmospheric Re-entry

The Znamya project (Russian: Знамя, meaning "Banner", Russian: [ˈznamʲə]) was a series of orbital space mirror experiments in the 1990s that intended to beam solar power to Earth by reflecting sunlight. The project was the brainchild of Vladimir Syromyatnikov, who was the project's lead engineer. Originally devised as a solar sail, Syromyatnikov pivoted to using the proposed hardware as a space mirror. The project consisted of two experiments: the Znamya 2 experiment and the failed Znamya 2.5, plus the proposed Znamya 3. After the failed deployment of the Znamya 2.5 the project was abandoned by the Russian Federal Space Agency.

== Znamya 2 ==
The Znamya 2 was a 20-metre wide space solar mirror. Znamya-2 was launched aboard Progress M-15 from Baikonur on 27 October 1992. After visiting the EO-12 crew aboard the Mir space station the Progress T-15 then undocked and deployed the reflector from the end of the Russian Progress spacecraft on 4 February 1993, next to the Russian Mir space station. The mirror deployed successfully, and, when illuminated, produced a 5 km wide bright spot, which traversed Europe from southern France to western Russia at a speed of 8 km/s. The bright spot had a luminosity equivalent to approximately that of a full moon. Although clouds covered much of Europe that morning, a few ground observers reported seeing a flash of light as the beam swept by.

The mirror was de-orbited after several hours and burned up in atmospheric re-entry over Canada.

The Znamya mirror had originally been designed as a prototype of a solar sail propulsion system, but was repurposed as a space mirror for illumination when interest in solar sails flagged.

== Znamya 2.5 ==
The Znamya 2.5 was a successor to the Znamya 2, which was deployed on 5 February 1999. It had a diameter of 25 m, and was expected to produce a bright spot 7 km in diameter, with luminosity between five and ten full moons. However, soon after deployment, the mirror caught on an antenna on the Progress, and ripped. After several vain attempts by Russian mission control to free the mirror from the antenna, the Znamya 2.5 was de-orbited, and burned up upon reentry.

== Znamya 3 ==
The Znamya 3 was intended to be a scaled-up version of the previous two Znamyas, with a diameter of 60–70 metres. It was never built, as the project was abandoned after the failure of the Znamya 2.5.
