= 1993 in spaceflight =

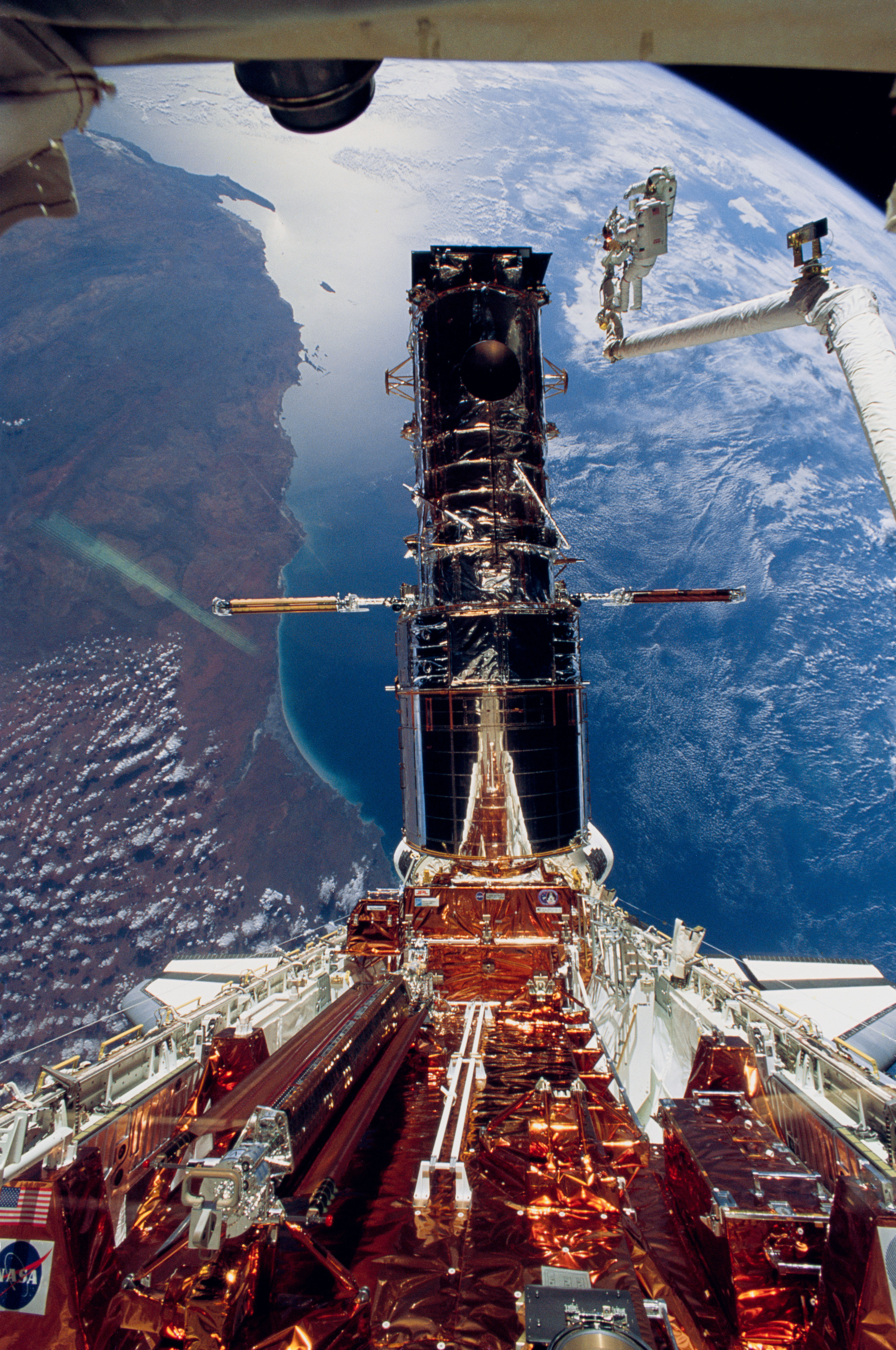
- Astronauts Story Musgrave and Jeffrey Hoffman repair the Hubble Space Telescope during STS-61.

Orbital launches
- First: 12 January
- Last: 22 December
- Total: 83
- Successes: 78
- Failures: 5
- Partial failures: 0

National firsts
- Satellite: Brazil; Portugal

Rockets
- Maiden flights: Ariane 4 42L; Atlas IIAS; PSLV; Start-1

Crewed flights
- Orbital: 9
- Total travellers: 47

1993 in spaceflight

The following is an outline of 1993 in spaceflight.

== First Hubble repair mission ==
STS-61 was NASA's first Hubble Space Telescope servicing mission, and the fifth flight of the Space Shuttle Endeavour. The mission launched on December 2, 1993, from Kennedy Space Center (KSC) in Florida. The mission restored the spaceborne observatory's vision (marred by spherical aberration in its mirror) with the installation of a new main camera and a corrective optics package (COSTAR). This correction occurred more than three and a half years after the Hubble was launched aboard STS-31 in April 1990. The flight also brought instrument upgrades and new solar arrays to the telescope. With its very heavy workload, the STS-61 mission was one of the most complex in the Shuttle's history.

== Orbital launches ==
- ← Jan
- Feb
- Mar
- Apr
- May
- Jun
- Jul
- Aug
- Sep
- Oct
- Nov
- Dec →

Date and time (UTC)	Rocket	Flight number	Launch site		LSP	
Date and time (UTC)	Payload (⚀ = CubeSat)	Operator	Orbit	Function	Decay (UTC)	Outcome
Date and time (UTC)	Remarks					
=== January ===
12 January; 11:10:17	(Russia) Kosmos-3M		(Russia) Plesetsk Site 133/3		(Russia) VKS	
12 January; 11:10:17	(Russia) Kosmos 2230 (Tsikada)	MO RF	Low Earth	Navigation	In orbit	Successful
13 January; 01:49	(Russia) Molniya-M		(Russia) Plesetsk Site 43/3		(Russia) VKS	
13 January; 01:49	(Russia) Molniya-1-85	MOM	Molniya	Communications	15 November 2005	Successful
13 January; 13:59:30	(United States) Space Shuttle Endeavour		(United States) Kennedy LC-39B		(United States) United Space Alliance	
13 January; 13:59:30	(United States) STS-54	NASA	Low Earth	Satellite deployment	19 January; 13:37:47	Successful
13 January; 13:59:30	(United States) TDRS-6 (TDRS-F)	NASA	Geosynchronous	Communications	In orbit	Operational
13 January; 13:59:30	Crewed orbital flight with five astronauts					
19 January; 14:49:01	(Russia) Soyuz-U		(Russia) Plesetsk Site 43/3		(Russia) VKS	
19 January; 14:49:01	(Russia) Kosmos 2231 (Yantar-4K2-66)	MOM	Low Earth	Reconnaissance	25 March	Successful
24 January; 05:58:05	(Russia) Soyuz-U2		(Kazakhstan) Baikonur Site 1/5		(Russia) VKS	
24 January; 05:58:05	(Russia) Soyuz TM-16	Roskosmos	Low Earth (Mir)	Mir EO-13	22 July	Successful
24 January; 05:58:05	Crewed orbital flight with two cosmonauts					
26 January; 15:55:26	(Russia) Molniya-M		(Russia) Plesetsk Site 16/2		(Russia) VKS	
26 January; 15:55:26	(Russia) Kosmos 2232 (Oko)	MOM	Molniya	Missile defence	In orbit	Operational
=== February ===
3 February; 02:55	(United States) Delta II (7925)		(United States) Cape Canaveral LC-17A		(United States) McDonnell Douglas	
3 February; 02:55	(United States) USA-88 (GPS IIA-9)	US Air Force	Medium Earth	Navigation	In orbit	Successful
9 February; 02:56:56	(Russia) Kosmos-3M		(Russia) Plesetsk Site 133/3		(Russia) VKS	
9 February; 02:56:56	(Russia) Kosmos 2233 (Parus)	MO RF	Low Earth	Navigation	In orbit	Operational
9 February; 14:30	(United States) Pegasus		(United States) Kennedy Balls 8		(United States) Orbital Sciences	
9 February; 14:30	(United States) Orbcomm CDS-1	Orbcomm	Low Earth	Communications	In orbit	Successful
9 February; 14:30	(Brazil) SCD-1	INPE	Low Earth	Environmental	In orbit	Operational
17 February; 20:09:47	(Russia) Proton-K/DM-2		(Kazakhstan) Baikonur Site 81/23		(Russia) VKS	
17 February; 20:09:47	(Russia) Kosmos 2234 (GLONASS)	MOM	Medium Earth	Navigation	In orbit	Operational
17 February; 20:09:47	(Russia) Kosmos 2235 (GLONASS)	MOM	Medium Earth	Navigation	In orbit	Operational
17 February; 20:09:47	(Russia) Kosmos 2236 (GLONASS)	MOM	Medium Earth	Navigation	In orbit	Operational
20 February; 02:20	(Japan) Mu-3S-II		(Japan) Kagoshima LA-M1		(Japan) ISAS	
20 February; 02:20	(Japan) ASCA (ASTRO-D)	ISAS	Low Earth	Astronomy	2 March 2001	Successful
21 February; 18:32:33	(Russia) Soyuz-U2		(Kazakhstan) Baikonur Site 1/5		(Russia) VKS	
21 February; 18:32:33	(Russia) Progress M-16	Roskosmos	Low Earth (Mir)	Logistics	27 March	Successful
=== March ===
25 March; 02:28	(Russia) Proton-K/DM-2		(Kazakhstan) Baikonur Site 81/23		(Russia) VKS	
25 March; 02:28	(Russia) Raduga 29	MOM	Geostationary	Communications	In orbit	Operational
25 March; 13:15:27	(Russia) Start-1		(Russia) Plesetsk Site 158		(Russia) RVSN	
25 March; 13:15:27	(Russia) EKA	MO RF	Low Earth	Launch vehicle evaluation, mass simulator	In orbit	Successful
25 March; 13:15:27	Maiden flight of Start-1					
25 March; 21:38	(United States) Atlas I		(United States) Cape Canaveral LC-36B		(United States) General Dynamics	
25 March; 21:38	(United States) UHF-1	US Navy	Geosynchronous	Communications	In orbit	Launch failure
25 March; 21:38	Booster engine failure left spacecraft in useless orbit					
26 March; 02:21	(Ukraine) Zenit-2		(Kazakhstan) Baikonur Site 45/1		(Russia) VKS	
26 March; 02:21	(Russia) Kosmos 2237 (Tselina-2)	MO RF	Low Earth	ELINT	In orbit	Operational
30 March; 03:09	(United States) Delta II (7925)		(United States) Cape Canaveral LC-17A		(United States) McDonnell Douglas	
30 March; 03:09	(United States) USA-90 (GPS IIA-10)	US Air Force	Medium Earth	Navigation	In orbit	Successful
30 March; 03:09	Decommissioned on 24 October 2005					
30 March; 12:00	(Ukraine) Tsyklon-2		(Kazakhstan) Baikonur Site 90		(Russia) VKS	
30 March; 12:00	(Russia) Kosmos 2238 (US-PM)	MO RF	Low Earth	Reconnaissance	10 December 1994	Successful
31 March; 03:34:13	(Russia) Soyuz-U2		(Kazakhstan) Baikonur Site 1/5		(Russia) VKS	
31 March; 03:34:13	(Russia) Progress M-17	Roskosmos	Low Earth (Mir)	Logistics	3 March 1994	Successful
=== April ===
1 April; 18:57:26	(Russia) Kosmos-3M		(Russia) Plesetsk Site 133/3		(Russia) VKS	
1 April; 18:57:26	(Russia) Kosmos 2239 (Parus)	MO RF	Low Earth	Navigation	In orbit	Operational
2 April; 14:30:01	(Russia) Soyuz-U		(Russia) Plesetsk Site 16/2		(Russia) VKS	
2 April; 14:30:01	(Russia) Kosmos 2240 (Yantar-4K2)	MOM	Low Earth	Reconnaissance	7 June	Successful
6 April; 19:07:27	(Russia) Molniya-M		(Russia) Plesetsk Site 43/4		(Russia) VKS	
6 April; 19:07:27	(Russia) Kosmos 2241 (Oko)	MOM	Molniya	Missile defence	8 March 2022	Successful
8 April; 05:29	(United States) Space Shuttle Discovery		(United States) Kennedy LC-39B		(United States) United Space Alliance	
8 April; 05:29	(United States) STS-56	NASA	Low Earth	Solar astronomy	17 April; 11:37:19	Successful
8 April; 05:29	(United States) Spacelab Pallet	ESA/NASA	Low Earth (Discovery)	Spacelab ATLAS-2	17 April; 11:37:19	Successful
8 April; 05:29	(United States) SPARTAN-201	NASA	Low Earth (Discovery)	Solar	17 April; 11:37:19	Successful
8 April; 05:29	Crewed orbital flight with five astronauts; SPARTAN deployed from Discovery on 11 April and retrieved on 13 April					
16 April; 07:49	(Ukraine) Tsyklon-3		(Russia) Plesetsk		(Russia) VKS	
16 April; 07:49	(Russia) Kosmos 2242 (Tselina)	MO RF	Low Earth	ELINT	In orbit	Operational
21 April; 00:23	(Russia) Molniya-M		(Russia) Plesetsk Site 43/4		(Russia) VKS	
21 April; 00:23	(Russia) Molniya 3-57L	MOM	Molniya	Communications	25 January 2004	Successful
25 April; 13:56	(United States) Pegasus		(United States) Edwards Balls 8		(United States) Orbital Sciences	
25 April; 13:56	(United States) Orbcomm CDS-2 (VSUME)	Orbcomm	Low Earth	Communications	In orbit	Successful
25 April; 13:56	(United States) Alexis	STP	Low Earth	Technology	In orbit	Successful
26 April; 14:50	(United States) Space Shuttle Columbia		(United States) Kennedy LC-39A		(United States) United Space Alliance	
26 April; 14:50	(United States) (Germany) STS-55	NASA/DLR	Low Earth	Microgravity	6 May; 14:30	Successful
26 April; 14:50	(United States) Spacelab Long Module 1	NASA/DLR	Low Earth (Columbia)	Spacelab D2	6 May; 14:30	Successful
26 April; 14:50	Crewed orbital flight with seven astronauts					
27 April; 10:35	(Russia) Soyuz-U		(Kazakhstan) Baikonur Site 31/6		(Russia) VKS	
27 April; 10:35	(Russia) Kosmos 2243 (Yantar-1KFT)	MOM	Low Earth	Reconnaissance	6 May	Spacecraft failure
27 April; 10:35	Mission aborted after six days					
28 April; 03:39:20	(Ukraine) Tsyklon-2		(Kazakhstan) Baikonur Site 90		(Russia) VKS	
28 April; 03:39:20	(Russia) Kosmos 2244 (US-PM)	MO RF	Low Earth	Reconnaissance	18 March 1995	Successful
=== May ===
11 May; 14:56:01	(Ukraine) Tsyklon-3		(Russia) Plesetsk		(Russia) VKS	
11 May; 14:56:01	(Russia) Kosmos 2245 (Strela)	MO RF	Low Earth	Communications	In orbit	Successful
11 May; 14:56:01	(Russia) Kosmos 2246 (Strela)	MO RF	Low Earth	Communications	In orbit	Successful
11 May; 14:56:01	(Russia) Kosmos 2247 (Strela)	MO RF	Low Earth	Communications	In orbit	Successful
11 May; 14:56:01	(Russia) Kosmos 2248 (Strela)	MO RF	Low Earth	Communications	In orbit	Successful
11 May; 14:56:01	(Russia) Kosmos 2249 (Strela)	MO RF	Low Earth	Communications	In orbit	Successful
11 May; 14:56:01	(Russia) Komsos 2250 (Strela)	MO RF	Low Earth	Communications	In orbit	Successful
12 May; 00:56:32	(France) Ariane 4 (42L)		(France) Kourou ELA-2		(France) Arianespace	
12 May; 00:56:32	(Luxembourg) Astra 1C	SES Astra	Geostationary	Communications	In orbit	Operational
12 May; 00:56:32	Arsene (Oscar-24)	RACE (Europe)/AMSAT	Medium Earth	Communications	In orbit	Partial satellite failure
12 May; 00:56:32	Maiden flight of Ariane 4 (42L); VHF transponder on Arsene failed during launch and UHF/S-band transponder failed on 6 September 1993, making satellite unusable					
13 May; 00:07	(United States) Delta II (7925)		(United States) Cape Canaveral LC-17A		(United States) McDonnell Douglas	
13 May; 00:07	(United States) USA-91 (GPS IIA-11)	US Air Force	Medium Earth	Navigation	In orbit	Successful
13 May; 00:07	Decommissioned on 20 December 2007					
21 May; 09:15:01	(Russia) Soyuz-U		(Russia) Plesetsk Site 16/2		(Russia) VKS	
21 May; 09:15:01	(Russia) Resurs F-17	MOM	Low Earth	Remote sensing	20 June	Successful
22 May; 06:41:47	(Russia) Soyuz-U2		(Kazakhstan) Baikonur Site 1/5		(Russia) VKS	
22 May; 06:41:47	(Russia) Progress M-18	Roskosmos	Low Earth (Mir)	Logistics	4 July	Successful
26 May; 03:23	(Russia) Molniya-M		(Russia) Plesetsk Site 43/4		(Russia) VKS	
26 May; 03:23	(Russia) Molniya 1–86	MOM	Molniya	Communications	In orbit	Operational
27 May; 01:22	(Russia) Proton-K/DM-2		(Kazakhstan) Baikonur Site 81/23		(Russia) VKS	
27 May; 01:22	(Russia) Gorizont 28	RSCC	Intended: Geosynchronous	Communications	27 May	Launch Failure
=== June ===
16 June; 04:17	(Russia) Kosmos-3M		(Russia) Plesetsk Site 132/1		(Russia) VKS	
16 June; 04:17	(Russia) Kosmos 2251 (Strela-2M)	MO RF	Low Earth	Communications	10 February 2009	Successful
16 June; 04:17	Collided with Iridium 33 after retirement.					
21 June; 13:07:22	(United States) Space Shuttle Endeavour		(United States) Kennedy LC-39B		(United States) United Space Alliance	
21 June; 13:07:22	(United States) STS-57	NASA	Low Earth	Microgravity	1 July; 12:52	Successful
21 June; 13:07:22	(United States) SpaceHab LSM	NASA/SpaceHab	Low Earth (Endeavour)	Scientific research	1 July; 12:52	Successful
21 June; 13:07:22	Crewed orbital flight with six astronauts; Retrieved European Retrievable Carrier					
24 June; 04:12:41	(Ukraine) Tsyklon-3		(Russia) Plesetsk		(Russia) VKS	
24 June; 04:12:41	(Russia) Kosmos 2252 (Strela-3)	MO RF	Low Earth	Communications	In orbit	Successful
24 June; 04:12:41	(Russia) Kosmos 2253 (Strela-3)	MO RF	Low Earth	Communications	In orbit	Successful
24 June; 04:12:41	(Russia) Kosmos 2254 (Strela-3)	MO RF	Low Earth	Communications	In orbit	Successful
24 June; 04:12:41	(Russia) Kosmos 2255 (Strela-3)	MO RF	Low Earth	Communications	In orbit	Successful
24 June; 04:12:41	(Russia) Kosmos 2256 (Strela-3)	MO RF	Low Earth	Communications	In orbit	Successful
24 June; 04:12:41	(Russia) Kosmos 2257 (Strela-3)	MO RF	Low Earth	Communications	In orbit	Successful
25 June; 00:18	(France) Ariane 4 (42P)		(France) Kourou ELA-2		(France) Arianespace	
25 June; 00:18	(United States) Galaxy-4H	Hughes	Geosynchronous	Communications	In orbit	Operational
25 June; 08:20	(Russia) Soyuz-U		(Russia) Plesetsk Site 16/2		(Russia) VKS	
25 June; 08:20	(Russia) Resurs F-17	MOM	Low Earth	Remote sensing	12 July	Successful
25 June; 23:30	(United States) Scout G-1		(United States) Vandenberg SLC-5		(United States) NASA	
25 June; 23:30	(United States) RADCAL (P92-1)	US Air Force/STP	Low Earth (Polar)	Radar calibration	In orbit	Successful
26 June; 13:27	(United States) Delta II (7925)		(United States) Cape Canaveral LC-17A		(United States) McDonnell Douglas	
26 June; 13:27	(United States) USA-92 (GPS IIA-12)	US Air Force	Medium Earth	Navigation	In orbit	Operational
26 June; 13:27	(United States) PMG	NASA	Low Earth	Technology	In orbit	Successful
=== July ===
1 July; 14:32:58	(Russia) Soyuz-U2		(Kazakhstan) Baikonur Site 1/5		(Russia) VKS	
1 July; 14:32:58	(Russia) Soyuz TM-17	Roskosmos	Low Earth (Mir)	Mir EO-14	14 January 1994	Successful
1 July; 14:32:58	Crewed orbital fight with three cosmonauts					
7 July; 07:15	(Ukraine) Tsyklon-2		(Kazakhstan) Baikonur Site 90		(Russia) VKS	
7 July; 07:15	(Russia) Kosmos 2258 (US-PM)	MO RF	Low Earth	Reconnaissance	8 June 1995	Successful
14 July; 16:40	(Russia) Soyuz-U		(Russia) Plesetsk Site 43/3		(Russia) VKS	
14 July; 16:40	(Russia) Kosmos 2259 (Yantar-4K2)	MOM	Low Earth	Reconnaissance	25 July	Successful
19 July; 22:04	(United States) Atlas II/IABS		(United States) Cape Canaveral LC-36A		(United States) General Dynamics	
19 July; 22:04	(United States) USA-93 (DSCS IIIB-9)	US Air Force	Geostationary	Communications	In orbit	Operational
22 July; 08:45	(Russia) Soyuz-U		(Russia) Plesetsk Site 43/3		(Russia) VKS	
22 July; 08:45	(Russia) Kosmos 2260 (Zenit-8)	MOM	Low Earth	Reconnaissance	5 August	Successful
22 July; 22:58:55	(France) Ariane 4 (44L)		(France) Kourou ELA-2		(France) Arianespace	
22 July; 22:58:55	(Spain) Hispasat 1B	Hispasat	Geostationary	Communications	In orbit	Operational
22 July; 22:58:55	(India) INSAT-2B	ISRO	Geostationary	Communications	In orbit	Successful
=== August ===
2 August; 19:59	(United States) Titan IVA (403)		(United States) Vandenberg SLC-4E		(United States) US Air Force	
2 August; 19:59	(United States) SLDCOM-3	NRO	Intended: Low Earth	Communications	T+101 seconds	Launch Failure
2 August; 19:59	(United States) NOSS-2-3A	US Navy	Intended: Low Earth	ELINT	T+101 seconds	Launch Failure
2 August; 19:59	(United States) NOSS-2-3B	US Navy	Intended: Low Earth	ELINT	T+101 seconds	Launch Failure
2 August; 19:59	(United States) NOSS-2-3C	US Navy	Intended: Low Earth	ELINT	T+101 seconds	Launch Failure
2 August; 19:59	Apogee: 33 kilometres (21 mi). One of the UA1207 solid rocket boosters exploded at T+101 seconds. Failure was attributed to damage caused by the ground crew due to an errant cut into one of the SRB segments while repairing the booster.					
4 August; 00:52	(Russia) Molniya-M		(Russia) Plesetsk Site 43/3		(Russia) VKS	
4 August; 00:52	(Russia) Molniya-3 No.58L	MOM	Molniya	Communications	31 December 2013	Successful
9 August; 10:02	(United States) Atlas E		(United States) Vandenberg SLC-3W		(United States) US Air Force	
9 August; 10:02	(United States) NOAA-13	NOAA	Sun-synchronous	Weather	In orbit	Successful
10 August; 14:53:45	(Russia) Molniya-M		(Russia) Plesetsk Site 16/2		(Russia) VKS	
10 August; 14:53:45	(Russia) Kosmos 2261 (Oko)	MOM	Molniya	Missile defence	In orbit	Operational
10 August; 22:23:45	(Russia) Soyuz-U		(Kazakhstan) Baikonur Site 1/5		(Russia) VKS	
10 August; 22:23:45	(Russia) Progress M-19	Roskosmos	Low Earth (Mir)	Logistics	13 October	Successful
24 August; 10:45	(Russia) Soyuz-U		(Russia) Plesetsk Site 16/2		(Russia) VKS	
24 August; 10:45	(Russia) Resurs F-19	MOM	Low Earth	Remote sensing	10 September	Successful
30 August; 12:38	(United States) Delta II (7925)		(United States) Cape Canaveral LC-17B		(United States) McDonnell Douglas	
30 August; 12:38	(United States) USA-94 (GPS IIA-13)	US Air Force	Medium Earth	Navigation	In orbit	Successful
30 August; 12:38	Decommissioned on 1 May 2013					
31 August; 04:40	(Ukraine) Tsyklon-3		(Russia) Plesetsk		(Russia) VKS	
31 August; 04:40	(Russia) Meteor 2–21	Roskosmos	Low Earth	Weather	In orbit	Successful
31 August; 04:40	(Italy) Temisat	Telespazio	Low Earth	Technology	In orbit	Successful
=== September ===
3 September; 11:17	(United States) Atlas I		(United States) Cape Canaveral LC-36B		(United States) General Dynamics	
3 September; 11:17	(United States) USA-95 (UHF-2)	US Navy	Geosynchronous	Communications	In orbit	Operational
7 September; 13:25	(Russia) Soyuz-U2		(Kazakhstan) Baikonur Site 31/6		(Russia) VKS	
7 September; 13:25	(Russia) Kosmos 2262 (Don)	MOM	Low Earth	Reconnaissance	18 December	Successful
12 September; 11:45	(United States) Space Shuttle Discovery		(United States) Kennedy LC-39B		(United States) United Space Alliance	
12 September; 11:45	(United States) STS-51	NASA	Low Earth	Satellite deployment	22 September; 07:56	Successful
12 September; 11:45	(United States) (Germany) ORFEUS-SPAS	NASA/DARA	Low Earth (Discovery)	Astronomy	22 September; 07:56	Successful
12 September; 11:45	(United States) ACTS	NASA	Geosynchronous	Communications	In orbit	Successful
12 September; 11:45	Crewed orbital flight with five astronauts; ACTS deployed using Transfer Orbit Stage and retired on 28 April 2004					
16 September; 07:36:19	(Ukraine) Zenit-2		(Kazakhstan) Baikonur Site 45/1		(Russia) VKS	
16 September; 07:36:19	(Russia) Kosmos 2263 (Tselina-2)	MO RF	Low Earth	ELINT	In orbit	Successful
17 September; 00:43:10	(Ukraine) Tsyklon-2		(Kazakhstan) Baikonur Site 90		(Russia) VKS	
17 September; 00:43:10	(Russia) Kosmos 2264 (US-PM)	MO RF	Low Earth	Reconnaissance	7 August 1995	Successful
20 September; 05:12	(India) PSLV		(India) Sriharikota FLP		(India) ISRO	
20 September; 05:12	(India) IRS 1E	ISRO	Intended: Low Earth	Remote sensing	20 September	Launch Failure
20 September; 05:12	Maiden flight of PSLV; failed to reach orbit due to guidance system malfunction					
26 September; 01:45	(France) Ariane 4 (40)		(France) Kourou ELA-2		(France) Arianespace	
26 September; 01:45	(France) SPOT 3	Spot Image	Sun-synchronous	Remote sensing	In orbit	Successful
26 September; 01:45	(France) Stella	CNES	Low Earth	Gravity	In orbit	Successful
26 September; 01:45	Healthsat-2	SatelLife	Low Earth	Communications	In orbit	Successful
26 September; 01:45	(South Korea) Kitsat-2	KAIST	Low Earth	Technology	In orbit	Successful
26 September; 01:45	(Italy) Eyesat	Interferometrics/AMSAT	Low Earth	Communications	In orbit	Successful
26 September; 01:45	(Italy) ItamSat	Interferometrics/AMSAT	Low Earth	Communications	In orbit	Successful
26 September; 01:45	(Portugal) PoSAT-1		Low Earth	Technology	In orbit	Successful
26 September; 01:45	SPOT 3 ceased functioning on 14 November 1997; PoSAT-1 is the first Portuguese satellite					
30 September; 17:05:59	(Russia) Proton-K/DM-2		(Kazakhstan) Baikonur Site 81/23		(Russia) VKS	
30 September; 17:05:59	(Russia) Raduga 30	MOM	Geostationary	Communications	In orbit	Operational
=== October ===
5 October; 17:56	(United States) Titan 23G/Star-37XFP-ISS		(United States) Vandenberg SLC-4W		(United States) US Air Force	
5 October; 17:56	(United States) Landsat 6	NASA	Intended: Low Earth	Remote sensing	5 October	Launch Failure
5 October; 17:56	Upper stage failed to ignite; Apogee: 724 kilometres (450 mi)					
8 October; 08:00	(China) Long March 2C		(China) Jiuquan LA-2B		(China) CALT	
8 October; 08:00	(China) FSW 1–5	CASC	Low Earth	Reconnaissance	28 October	Successful
11 October; 21:33:19	(Russia) Soyuz-U		(Kazakhstan) Baikonur Site 1/5		(Russia) VKS	
11 October; 21:33:19	(Russia) Progress M-20	Roskosmos	Low Earth (Mir)	Logistics	21 November	Successful
18 October; 14:53:10	(United States) Space Shuttle Columbia		(United States) Kennedy LC-39B		(United States) United Space Alliance	
18 October; 14:53:10	(United States) STS-58	NASA	Low Earth	Microgravity	1 November	Successful
18 October; 14:53:10	(United States) Spacelab Long Module 2	NASA	Low Earth (Columbia)	Spacelab SLS-2	1 November	Successful
18 October; 14:53:10	(United States) EDO Pallet	NASA	Low Earth (Columbia)	Cryogenic mission extension pallet	1 November	Successful
18 October; 14:53:10	Crewed orbital flight with seven astronauts					
22 October; 06:46	(France) Ariane 4 (44LP)		(France) Kourou ELA-2		(France) Arianespace	
22 October; 06:46	(United Nations) Intelsat 701	Intelsat	Geostationary	Communications	In orbit	Operational
26 October; 10:00:04	(Russia) Kosmos-3M		(Russia) Plesetsk Site 132/1		(Russia) VKS	
26 October; 10:00:04	(Russia) Kosmos 2265 (Taifun)	MO RF	Low Earth	Radar calibration	11 August 2003	Successful
28 October; 15:17	(Russia) Proton-K/DM-2		(Kazakhstan) Baikonur Site 81/23		(Russia) VKS	
28 October; 15:17	(Russia) Gorizont 28	MOM	Geostationary	Communications	In orbit	Operational
28 October; 17:04	(United States) Delta II (7925)		(United States) Cape Canaveral LC-17B		(United States) McDonnell Douglas	
28 October; 17:04	(United States) USA-96 (GPS IIA-14)	US Air Force	Medium Earth	Navigation	In orbit	Operational
=== November ===
2 November; 12:10:09	(Russia) Kosmos-3M		(Russia) Plesetsk Site 132/1		(Russia) VKS	
2 November; 12:10:09	(Russia) Kosmos 2266 (Parus)	MO RF	Low Earth	Navigation	In orbit	Operational
5 November; 08:25	(Russia) Soyuz-U		(Kazakhstan) Baikonur Site 1/5		(Russia) VKS	
5 November; 08:25	(Russia) Kosmos 2267 (Yantar-4KS1M)	MOM	Low Earth	Reconnaissance	28 December 1994	Successful
18 November; 13:54:59	(Russia) Proton-K/DM-2		(Kazakhstan) Baikonur Site 81/23		(Russia) VKS	
18 November; 13:54:59	(Russia) Gorizont 29	MOM	Geostationary	Communications	In orbit	Operational
18 November; 13:54:59	Sold to Rimsat as Rimsat-1, then to PASI as PASI-1, then to LMI as LIM-AP-1					
20 November; 01:17	(France) Ariane 4 (44LP)		(France) Kourou ELA-2		(France) Arianespace	
20 November; 01:17	(Mexico) Solidaridad-1	Tele Mexico	Geostationary	Communications	In orbit	Operational
20 November; 01:17	Meteosat 6	EUMETSAT	Geostationary	Weather	In orbit	Operational
28 November; 23:40	(United States) Atlas II		(United States) Cape Canaveral LC-36A		(United States) General Dynamics	
28 November; 23:40	(United States) USA-97 (DSCS IIIB-10)	US Air Force	Geostationary	Communications	In orbit	Operational
=== December ===
2 December; 09:27	(United States) Space Shuttle Endeavour		(United States) Kennedy LC-39B		(United States) United Space Alliance	
2 December; 09:27	(United States) STS-61	NASA	Low Earth (HST)	Satellite refurbishment (HST-SM1)	13 December	Successful
2 December; 09:27	Crewed orbital flight with seven astronauts. Hubble Space Telescope Servicing Mission 1. Replaced two components to add corrective optics, four gyroscopes, and the solar panels, as well as central computer upgrades.					
8 December; 00:48	(United States) Delta II (7925)		(United States) Cape Canaveral LC-17A		(United States) McDonnell Douglas	
8 December; 00:48	(United States) USA-98 (NATO-4B)	NATO/US Air Force	Geosynchronous	Communications	In orbit	Operational
16 December; 00:38	(United States) Atlas IIAS		(United States) Cape Canaveral LC-36B		(United States) General Dynamics	
16 December; 00:38	(United States) Telstar 401	AT&T	Geostationary	Communications	In orbit	Successful
16 December; 00:38	Maiden flight of Atlas IIAS; Telstar 401 destroyed by a magnetic storm in 1997					
18 December; 01:27	(France) Ariane 4 (44L)		(France) Kourou ELA-2		(France) Arianespace	
18 December; 01:27	(United States) DBS-1	Hughes	Geostationary	Communications	In orbit	Operational
18 December; 01:27	(Thailand) Thaicom 1	Shin Corporation	Geostationary	Communications	In orbit	Successful
22 December; 20:37:16	(Russia) Molniya-M		(Russia) Plesetsk Site 43/3		(Russia) VKS	
22 December; 20:37:16	(Russia) Molniya 1–87	MOM	Molniya	Communications	In orbit	Operational

- ← Jan
- Feb
- Mar
- Apr
- May
- Jun
- Jul
- Aug
- Sep
- Oct
- Nov
- Dec →

== Suborbital launches ==
- ← Jan
- Feb
- Mar
- Apr
- May
- Jun
- Jul
- Aug
- Sep
- Oct
- Nov
- Dec →

Date and time (UTC)	Rocket	Flight number	Launch site		LSP	
Date and time (UTC)	Payload (⚀ = CubeSat)	Operator	Orbit	Function	Decay (UTC)	Outcome
Date and time (UTC)	Remarks					
=== January ===
27 January; 10:43:41	(Canada) Black Brant XII		(United States) Poker Flat		(United States) NASA	
27 January; 10:43:41	(United States) PHAZE	NASA	Suborbital	Ionosphere	In orbit	Failure
27 January; 10:43:41	Apogee: 10 kilometres (6.2 mi); Failed before reaching space					
28 January	(United States) HPB		(United States) Wake Island		(United States) Orbital Sciences	
28 January	(United States)	US Air Force	Suborbital	Reentry vehicle test	28 January	Successful
28 January	Apogee: 400 kilometres (250 mi)					
=== February ===
5 February; 16:24	(United States) Storm		(United States) White Sands SULF		(United States) US Air Force	
5 February; 16:24	(United States)	US Air Force	Suborbital	BTTV-3 Validation	5 February	Successful
5 February; 16:24	Apogee: 200 kilometres (120 mi);					
7 February	(India) Prithvi		(India) Balasore		(India) DRDO	
7 February	(India)	DRDO	Suborbital	Missile test	7 February	Successful
7 February	Apogee: 100 kilometres (62 mi)					
8 February; 20:00	(Canada) Black Brant IX		(United States) White Sands LC-36		(United States) NASA	
8 February; 20:00	(United States)	NASA	Suborbital	Solar	8 February	Successful
8 February; 20:00	Apogee: 289 kilometres (180 mi)					
11 February	(United States) HPB		(United States) Wake Island		(United States) Orbital Sciences	
11 February	(United States)	Orbital Sciences	Suborbital	Re-entry vehicle test	11 February	Failure
11 February	Apogee: 2 kilometres (1.2 mi)					
18 February; 07:00	(Japan) S-520		(Japan) Kagoshima LA-K		(Japan) ISAS	
18 February; 07:00	(Japan) METS	ISAS	Suborbital	Ionosphere and Plasma	18 February	Successful
18 February; 07:00	Apogee: 272 kilometres (169 mi)					
19 February; 13:45	(India) RH-560		(India) Sriharikota		(India) ISRO	
19 February; 13:45	(India)	ISRO	Suborbital	Ionosphere	19 February	Successful
19 February; 13:45	Apogee: 290 kilometres (180 mi)					
19 February; 13:15	(India) RH-560		(India) Sriharikota		(India) ISRO	
19 February; 13:15	(India)	ISRO	Suborbital	Ionosphere	19 February	Successful
19 February; 13:15	Apogee: 300 kilometres (190 mi)					
19 February; 18:00	(Canada) Black Brant 9CM1		(United States) White Sands LC-36		(United States) Space Services Incorporated	
19 February; 18:00	(United States) CONSORT-6	SSI	Suborbital	Microgravity	19 February	Successful
19 February; 18:00	Apogee: 301 kilometres (187 mi)					
25 February; 13:40	(Russia) RT-2PM Topol		(Russia) Plesetsk		(Russia) RVSN	
25 February; 13:40	(Russia)	RVSN	Suborbital	Missile test	25 February	Successful
25 February; 13:40	Apogee: 1,000 kilometres (620 mi)					
26 February; 20:45	(United States) Polaris/STARS		(United States) Barking Sands LC-42		(United States) Space Data Corporation	
26 February; 20:45	(United States) FTU-1	SDC	Suborbital	Test	26 February	Successful
26 February; 20:45	Maiden flight of UGM-27 Polaris in STARS configuration; Apogee: 900 kilometres (560 mi)					
=== March ===
2 March	(United States) LGM-118 Peacekeeper		(United States) Vandenberg LF-02		(United States) US Air Force	
2 March	(United States)	US Air Force	Suborbital	Missile test	2 March	Successful
2 March	Apogee: 1,000 kilometres (620 mi)					
8 March; 00:15	(United States) Nike-Orion		(United States) White Sands		(United States) NASA	
8 March; 00:15	(United States) CWAS 29	NASA	Suborbital	Aeronomy	8 March	Successful
8 March; 00:15	Apogee: 140 kilometres (87 mi)					
10 March; 13:38	(United States) Nike-Orion		(United States) White Sands		(United States) NASA	
10 March; 13:38	(United States) CWAS 30	NASA	Suborbital	Aeronomy	10 March	Successful
10 March; 13:38	Apogee: 140 kilometres (87 mi)					
10 March	(United States) LGM-30G Minuteman III		(United States) Vandenberg LF-26		(United States) US Air Force	
10 March	(United States) GT-151GB	US Air Force	Suborbital	Missile test	10 March	Successful
10 March	Apogee: 1,300 kilometres (810 mi)					
16 March; 02:12:41	(Canada) Black Brant 9CM1		(United States) Wallops Island LA-2		(United States) SDIO	
16 March; 02:12:41	(United States) SPEAR 3	SDIO	Suborbital	Plasma	16 March	Successful
16 March; 02:12:41	Apogee: 290 kilometres (180 mi)					
22 March	(Brazil) Sonda-2		(Brazil) Alcântara		(Brazil) INPE	
22 March	(Brazil) Maruda	INPE	Suborbital	Ionosphere research	22 March	Successful
22 March	Apogee: 102 kilometres (63 mi)					
=== April ===
2 April; 10:09	(Canada) Black Brant XII		(United States) Poker Flat		(United States) NASA	
2 April; 10:09	(United States) Alaska 93	NASA/UCB	Suborbital	Ionosphere	2 April	Successful
2 April; 10:09	Apogee: 1,425 kilometres (885 mi)					
12 April; 17:18	(Canada) Black Brant IX		(United States) White Sands LC-36		(United States) NASA	
12 April; 17:18	(United States) NIXT	NASA	Suborbital	Solar	12 April	Successful
12 April; 17:18	Apogee: 226 kilometres (140 mi)					
17 April; 09:15	(Canada) Black Brant IX		(United States) White Sands LC-36		(United States) NASA	
17 April; 09:15	(United States) SXT	NASA/Colorado at Boulder	Suborbital	X-Ray astronomy	17 April	Successful
17 April; 09:15	Apogee: 254 kilometres (158 mi)					
19 April; 05:50	(India) RH-560		(India) Sriharikota		(India) ISRO	
19 April; 05:50	(India) SPICE-3	ISRO	Suborbital	Ionosphere	19 April	Successful
19 April; 05:50	Apogee: 323 kilometres (201 mi)					
=== May ===
1 May; 05:35	(United Kingdom) Skylark 7		(Sweden) Esrange LA-S		(Germany) DLR	
1 May; 05:35	(Germany) TEXUS 30	DLR	Suborbital	Microgravity	1 May	Successful
1 May; 05:35	Apogee: 234 kilometres (145 mi)					
6 May; 15:38	(Canada) Black Brant VIIIC		(United States) Poker Flat		(United States) NASA	
6 May; 15:38	(United States)	NASA	Suborbital	Plasma	6 May	Successful
6 May; 15:38	Apogee: 271 kilometres (168 mi)					
14 May; 01:10	(United States) Nike-Orion		(United States) White Sands		(United States) NASA	
14 May; 01:10	(United States) CWAS-31	NASA	Suborbital	Aeronomy	14 May	Successful
14 May; 01:10	Apogee: 140 kilometres (87 mi)					
19 May; 00:47	(United States) Nike-Orion		(United States) White Sands		(United States) NASA	
19 May; 00:47	(United States) CWAS-32	NASA	Suborbital	Aeronomy	19 May	Successful
19 May; 00:47	Apogee: 140 kilometres (87 mi)					
23 May; 09:17	(United States) LCLV		(United States) Cape Canaveral LC-20		(United States) BMDO	
23 May; 09:17	(United States) Red Tigress 2A	BMDO	Suborbital	Target	23 May	Successful
23 May; 09:17	Apogee: 378 kilometres (235 mi)					
26 May; 09:43	(United States) Nike-Orion		(France) Centre d'Essais des Landes		(Germany) DLR	
26 May; 09:43		DLR/Aérospatiale	Suborbital	Test flight	26 May	Successful
26 May; 09:43	Apogee: 140 kilometres (87 mi)					
28 May; 08:34	(United States) LCLV		(United States) Cape Canaveral LC-20		(United States) BMDO	
28 May; 08:34	(United States)	BMDO	Suborbital	Target	28 May	Successful
28 May; 08:34	Apogee: 390 kilometres (240 mi)					
29 May	(North Korea) Hwasong-6		(North Korea) Tonghae		(North Korea)	
29 May			Suborbital	Missile test	29 May	Successful
29 May	Apogee: 200 kilometres (120 mi)					
29 May	(North Korea) Hwasong-6		(North Korea) Tonghae		(North Korea)	
29 May			Suborbital	Missile test	29 May	Successful
29 May	Apogee: 200 kilometres (120 mi)					
29 May	(North Korea) Hwasong-7		(North Korea) Tonghae		(North Korea)	
29 May			Suborbital	Missile test	29 May	Successful
29 May	Apogee: 150 kilometres (93 mi)					
30 May	(North Korea) Hwasong-6		(North Korea) Tonghae		(North Korea)	
30 May			Suborbital	Missile test	30 May	Successful
30 May	Apogee: 200 kilometres (120 mi)					
=== June ===
15 June; 17:30	(United States) LGM-30B Minuteman I		(United States) Vandenberg LF-03		(United States) US Air Force	
15 June; 17:30	(United States) RSLP TDT-1	US Air Force	Suborbital	Target	15 June	Launch failure
15 June; 17:30	Apogee: 1 kilometre (0.62 mi)					
16 June; 04:39	(Canada) Black Brant IX		(United States) White Sands LC-36		(United States) NASA	
16 June; 04:39	(United States)	NASA	Suborbital	Aeronomy	16 June	Successful
16 June; 04:39	Apogee: 253 kilometres (157 mi)					
22 June	(United States) Aries		(United States) White Sands LC-36		(United States) Orbital Sciences	
22 June	(United States)	BMDO	Suborbital	Technology	22 June	Successful
22 June	Apogee: 300 kilometres (190 mi)					
June	(India) Prithvi		(India) Balasore		(India) DRDO	
June	(India)	DRDO	Suborbital	Missile test	L+1 hour	Successful
June	Apogee: 100 kilometres (62 mi)					
=== July ===
2 July	(United States) LGM-30G Minuteman III		(United States) Vandenberg LF-09		(United States) US Air Force	
2 July	(United States) GT-152GM	US Air Force	Suborbital	Missile test	2 July	Successful
2 July	Apogee: 1,300 kilometres (810 mi)					
7 July	(United States) UGM-133 Trident II		(United States) USS Pennsylvania, Eastern Range		(United States) US Navy	
7 July	(United States)	US Navy	Suborbital	Missile test	7 July	Successful
7 July	Apogee: 1,000 kilometres (620 mi)					
7 July	(United States) UGM-133 Trident II		(United States) USS Pennsylvania, Eastern Range		(United States) US Navy	
7 July	(United States)	US Navy	Suborbital	Missile test	7 July	Successful
7 July	Apogee: 1,000 kilometres (620 mi)					
14 July; 03:19	(United States) LGM-118 Peacekeeper		(United States) Vandenberg LF-05		(United States) US Air Force	
14 July; 03:19	(United States)	US Air Force	Suborbital	Missile test	14 July	Successful
14 July; 03:19	Apogee: 1,000 kilometres (620 mi)					
22 July; 08:25	(Canada) Black Brant X		(United States) Wallops Island		(United States) NASA	
22 July; 08:25	(United States) WISP-2	NASA	Suborbital	Plasma	22 July	Successful
22 July; 08:25	Apogee: 900 kilometres (560 mi)					
23 July; 08:22	(Russia) RT-2PM Topol		(Russia) Plesetsk		(Russia) RVSN	
23 July; 08:22	(Russia)	RVSN	Suborbital	Missile test	23 July	Successful
23 July; 08:22	Apogee: 1,000 kilometres (620 mi)					
27 July	(Canada) Black Brant 9CM1		(France) Centre d'Essais des Landes LA-CE		(France) Matra	
27 July	(France) BLANC	Matra	Suborbital	Photography	27 July	Successful
27 July	Apogee: 300 kilometres (190 mi)					
28 July; 05:43	(United States) Viper IIIA		(Sweden) Esrange		(United States) NASA	
28 July; 05:43	(United States)	NASA	Suborbital	Aeronomy	28 July	Successful
28 July; 05:43	Apogee: 116 kilometres (72 mi)					
30 July; 06:19	(United States) Viper IIIA		(Sweden) Esrange		(United States) NASA	
30 July; 06:19	(United States)	NASA	Suborbital	Aeronomy	30 July	Successful
30 July; 06:19	Apogee: 116 kilometres (72 mi)					
=== August ===
1 August; 01:46	(United States) Nike-Orion		(Norway) Andøya		NDRE	
1 August; 01:46	SCT-06	NDRE	Suborbital	Aeronomy	1 August	Successful
1 August; 01:46	Apogee: 140 kilometres (87 mi)					
2 August; 00:37	(United States) Viper IIIA		(Sweden) Esrange		(United States) NASA	
2 August; 00:37	(United States)	NASA	Suborbital	Aeronomy	2 August	Successful
2 August; 00:37	Apogee: 110 kilometres (68 mi)					
2 August; 01:02	(United States) Nike-Orion		(Sweden) Esrange		(Germany) (Sweden) DLR/SSC	
2 August; 01:02	(Sweden) Decimals-B	SSC	Suborbital	Aeronomy	2 August	Successful
2 August; 01:02	Apogee: 105 kilometres (65 mi)					
2 August; 01:24	(United States) Viper IIIA		(Sweden) Esrange		(United States) NASA	
2 August; 01:24	(United States)	NASA	Suborbital	Aeronomy	2 August	Successful
2 August; 01:24	Apogee: 105 kilometres (65 mi)					
2 August; 03:24	(United States) Viper IIIA		(Sweden) Esrange		(United States) NASA	
2 August; 03:24	(United States)	NASA	Suborbital	Aeronomy	2 August	Successful
2 August; 03:24	Apogee: 106 kilometres (66 mi)					
2 August; 05:54	(United States) Viper IIIA		(Sweden) Esrange		(United States) NASA	
2 August; 05:54	(United States)	NASA	Suborbital	Aeronomy	2 August	Successful
2 August; 05:54	Apogee: 107 kilometres (66 mi)					
17 August; 18:00	(Canada) Black Brant IX		(United States) White Sands LC-36		(United States) NASA	
17 August; 18:00	(United States) SERTS 93-5	NASA	Suborbital	Solar	17 August	Successful
17 August; 18:00	Apogee: 312 kilometres (194 mi)					
20 August; 18:27	(United States) UGM-133 Trident II		(United States) USS Nebraska, Eastern Range		(United States) US Navy	
20 August; 18:27	(United States)	US Navy	Suborbital	Missile test	20 August	Successful
20 August; 18:27	Apogee: 1,000 kilometres (620 mi)					
25 August; 10:00	(United States) Polaris/STARS		(United States) Barking Sands LC-42		(United States) Space Data Corporation	
25 August; 10:00	(United States) Zodiac Beauchamp	SDC	Suborbital	Target	25 August	Successful
25 August; 10:00	Apogee: 900 kilometres (560 mi)					
28 August; 09:45	(United States) Aries		(United States) White Sands LC-36		(United States) NASA	
28 August; 09:45	(United States) SXT (XOGS)	NASA	Suborbital	X-Ray astronomy	28 August	Launch Failure
28 August; 09:45	Apogee: 8 kilometres (5.0 mi)					
31 August	(United States) LGM-30G Minuteman III		(United States) Vandenberg LF-26		(United States) US Air Force	
31 August	(United States) GT-153GB	US Air Force	Suborbital	Missile test	31 August	Successful
31 August	Apogee: 1,300 kilometres (810 mi)					
=== September ===
10 September; 16:00	(United States) Nike-Orion		(United States) White Sands		(United States) NASA	
10 September; 16:00	(United States) CWAS 33	NASA	Suborbital	Aeronomy	10 September	Successful
10 September; 16:00	Apogee: 140 kilometres (87 mi)					
13 September; 18:00	(United States) Nike-Orion		(United States) White Sands		(United States) NASA	
13 September; 18:00	(United States) CWAS 34	NASA	Suborbital	Aeronomy	13 September	Successful
13 September; 18:00	Apogee: 140 kilometres (87 mi)					
15 September	(United States) LGM-118 Peacekeeper		(United States) Vandenberg LF-02		(United States) US Air Force	
15 September	(United States)	US Air Force	Suborbital	Missile test	15 September	Successful
15 September	Apogee: 1,000 kilometres (620 mi)					
16 September; 23:00	(Japan) TR-1A		(Japan) Tanegashima LA-T		(Japan) NASDA	
16 September; 23:00	(Japan)	NASDA	Suborbital	Microgravity	16 September	Successful
16 September; 23:00	Apogee: 264 kilometres (164 mi)					
=== October ===
4 October; 17:45	(Canada) Black Brant IX		(United States) White Sands LC-36		(United States) NASA	
4 October; 17:45	(United States) CU-4	NASA	Suborbital	Ultraviolet astronomy	4 October	Successful
4 October; 17:45	Apogee: 300 kilometres (190 mi)					
4 October; 19:35	(United States) Taurus-Orion		(United States) White Sands		(United States) NASA	
4 October; 19:35	(United States)	NASA	Suborbital	Plasma	4 October	Successful
4 October; 19:35	Apogee: 200 kilometres (120 mi)					
8 October	(United States) Storm		(United States) White Sands SULF		(United States) US Air Force	
8 October	(United States) BTTV-4 (PAC-2)	US Air Force	Suborbital	Target	8 October	Successful
8 October	Apogee: 200 kilometres (120 mi)					
21 October; 01:46	(Spain) INTA-300B		(Spain) El Arenosillo		(Spain) INTA	
21 October; 01:46	(Spain) FEIROX (FEIROH)	INTA	Suborbital	Aeronomy	21 October	Successful
21 October; 01:46	Apogee: 154 kilometres (96 mi)					
26 October	(United States) Storm		(United States) White Sands LC-36		(United States) US Air Force	
26 October	(United States) BTTV-5 (ERINT)	US Air Force	Suborbital	Target	26 October	Successful
26 October	Apogee: 200 kilometres (120 mi)					
=== November ===
2 November	(Russia) Zyb		(Russia) Submarine, Pacific Ocean		(Russia) Russian Navy	
2 November	(Russia) Efir	RVSN	Suborbital	Technology	L+1 hour	Successful
2 November	Apogee: 500 kilometres (310 mi)					
3 November	(France) S3		(France) Centre d'Essais des Landes		(France)	
3 November	(France)		Suborbital	Missile test	3 November	Successful
3 November	Apogee: 1,000 kilometres (620 mi)					
4 November; 07:07	(United Kingdom) Skylark 7		(Sweden) Esrange LA-S		(Sweden) SSC	
4 November; 07:07	(Sweden) MASER 6	SSC	Suborbital	Microgravity	4 November	Successful
4 November; 07:07	Apogee: 243 kilometres (151 mi)					
17 November	(Brazil) Sonda-2		(Brazil) Natal		(Brazil) INPE	
17 November	(Brazil)	INPE	Suborbital	Ionosphere	17 November	Successful
17 November	Apogee: 555 kilometres (345 mi)					
18 November	(United States) UGM-133 Trident II		(United States) USS Nebraska, Eastern Range		(United States) US Navy	
18 November	(United States)	US Navy	Suborbital	Missile test	18 November	Successful
18 November	Apogee: 1,000 kilometres (620 mi)					
26 November; 11:00	(United Kingdom) Skylark 7		(Sweden) Esrange LA-S		(Germany) DLR	
26 November; 11:00	(Germany) TEXUS 31	DLR	Suborbital	Microgravity	26 November	Successful
26 November; 11:00	Apogee: 257 kilometres (160 mi)					
29 November; 09:30	(United States) Nike-Improved Orion		(Sweden) Esrange		(Germany) DLR	
29 November; 09:30	(Germany) MINI-TEXUS 1	DLR	Suborbital	Microgravity	29 November	Successful
29 November; 09:30	Apogee: 146 kilometres (91 mi)					
30 November	(United States) Storm		(United States) White Sands LC-36		(United States) US Air Force	
30 November	(United States) BTTV-6 (ERINT/GTF-2)	US Air Force	Suborbital	Target	30 November	Successful
30 November	Apogee: 200 kilometres (120 mi)					
=== December ===
17 December	(United States) Storm		(United States) White Sands SULF		(United States) US Air Force	
17 December	(United States) MTTV-1 (ERINT)	US Air Force	Suborbital	Target	17 December	Successful
17 December	Apogee: 200 kilometres (120 mi)					
December	(Russia) Volna		(Russia) Submarine		(Russia) Russian Navy	
December	(Russia)	Russian Navy	Suborbital	Missile test	L+1 hour	Successful
December	Apogee: 1,000 kilometres (620 mi)					

- ← Jan
- Feb
- Mar
- Apr
- May
- Jun
- Jul
- Aug
- Sep
- Oct
- Nov
- Dec →

== Deep Space Rendezvous ==
Date (GMT)	Spacecraft	Event	Remarks
10 April	Hiten	Crashed intentionally on the Moon	
22 August	Mars Observer	Lost contact prior to orbit insertion	
28 August	Galileo	Flyby of 243 Ida	Closest approach: 2,400 kilometres (1,500 mi)

== EVAs ==
Start date/time	Duration	End time	Spacecraft	Crew	Remarks
17 January	4 hours 28 minutes		STS-54; Endeavour	(United States) Gregory J. Harbaugh (United States) Mario Runco, Jr.	Tested space station construction techniques and mobility techniques.
19 April; 17:15	5 hours 25 minutes	22:40	Mir EO-13; Kvant-2	(Russia) Gennadi Manakov (Russia) Aleksandr Poleshchuk	Used the Strela boom to install an electric motor on the Kvant-1 module for solar arrays originally installed on the Kristall module. After the installation, Poleshchuk noticed that one of the handles on the Strela boom had become loose and drifted away from Mir. The loss of the Strela handle meant the next EVA would have to be delayed until a new handle could be lifted to orbit the next Progress supply launch.
18 June; 17:25	4 hours 33 minutes	21:58	Mir EO-13; Kvant-2	(Russia) Gennadi Manakov (Russia) Aleksandr Poleschuk	After receiving the replacement part, Manakov and Poleshchuk first repaired the Strela boom and then installed the second electric drive for the solar array.
25 June	5 hours 50 minutes		STS-57; Endeavour	(United States) G. David Low (United States) Peter Wisoff	Helped secure the antenna on the captured EURECA satellite in its stored position for return to Earth. Then both spacewalkers practiced construction maneuvers on the RMS.
16 September; 05:57	4 hours 18 minutes	10:16	Mir EO-14; Kvant-2	(Russia) Vasily Tsibliyev (Russia) Aleksandr Serebrov	Began assembly of the experimental Rapana truss structure.
16 September; 08:40	7 hours 5 minutes	15:45	STS-51; Discovery	(United States) James H. Newman (United States) Carl E. Walz	Carried out tests on tools, tethers, and a foot restraint system in anticipation of the repair of the Hubble Space Telescope. A stuck tool chest lid slowed the closeout of spacewalk for at least 45 minutes.
20 September; 03:51	3 hours 13 minutes	07:05	Mir EO-14; Kvant-2	(Russia) Vasily Tsibliyev (Russia) Aleksandr Serebrov	Completed assembly of the Rapana truss.
28 September; 00:57	1 hour 52 minutes	02:48	Mir EO-14; Kvant-2	(Russia) Vasily Tsibliyev (Russia) Aleksandr Serebrov	Inspected the Mir exterior for damage from the recent Perseid meteoroid shower. The most notable damage they found was a 5-millimetre (0.20 in) hole on one of the solar arrays.
22 October; 15:47	38 minutes	16:25	Mir EO-14; Kvant-2	(Russia) Vasily Tsibliyev (Russia) Aleksandr Serebrov	Continued their inspection of the Mir exterior for damage from the Perseids.
29 October; 13:38	4 hours 12 minutes	17:50	Mir EO-14; Kvant-2	(Russia) Vasily Tsibliyev (Russia) Aleksandr Serebrov	Completed their inspection of the entire outer surface of the Mir. They observed several marks on the hull, there were no complete penetrations. The spacewalking team did notice an unidentified piece of metal drifting by the orbital complex during their inspections.
5 December; 03:44	7 hours 54 minutes	11:38	STS-61; Endeavour	(United States) Story Musgrave (United States) Jeffrey A. Hoffman	HST servicing: Replaced two sets of gryoscopes and electrical control units, as well as a set of eight fuses. The spacewalks had considerable difficulty closing the latches on the doors due to thermal expansion of the closure bolts. Before re-entering the shuttle, the team prepared the payload bay for the next EVA.
6 December; 03:29	6 hours 36 minutes	10:05	STS-61; Endeavour	(United States) Kathryn C. Thornton (United States) Thomas Akers	HST servicing: Thorton rode the RMS to handle the solar arrays while Akers made the cable connections as the team replaced two solar arrays on Hubble. One array was discarded into space, and one array was furled and stowed for return to earth.
7 December; 03:35	6 hours 47 minutes	10:22	STS-61; Endeavour	(United States) Story Musgrave (United States) Jeffrey A. Hoffman	HST servicing: Replaced the WFPC with WFPC 2 and two magnetometers.
8 December; 03:13	7 hours 21 minutes	10:03	STS-61; Endeavour	(United States) Kathryn C. Thornton (United States) Thomas Akers	HST servicing: Replaced Hubble's High Speed Photometer (HSP) with the Corrective Optics Space Telescope Axial Replacement (COSTAR). This replacement fixed the spherical aberration in Hubble's mirror. The HSP was stowed for return to earth.
9 December; 03:30	7 hours 21 minutes	10:51	STS-61; Endeavour	(United States) Story Musgrave (United States) Jeffrey A. Hoffman	HST servicing: Replaced the electronics for the solar array drive motors. They also placed some made-on-Endeavour covers over the new magnetometers to protect them from debris.
