= ISTSat-1 =

2024 Portuguese satellite

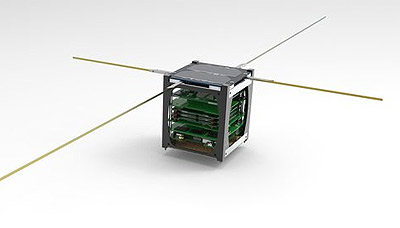
- Rendering of ISTSat-1
- Mission type: ADS-B
- Operator: Instituto Superior Técnico
- COSPAR ID: 2024-128D
- SATCAT no.: 60238
- Website: istsat-one.tecnico.ulisboa.pt
- Mission duration: 1 Year

Spacecraft properties
- Spacecraft type: CubeSat
- Manufacturer: IST NanosatLab
- Payload mass: 1.095 kg (2.41 lb)
- Dimensions: 10 cm x 10 cm x 10.3 cm (1U)

Start of mission
- Launch date: July 9, 2024, 19:00 UTC (21:00 CEST)
- Rocket: Ariane 6
- Launch site: Guiana Space Centre, ELA-4

Orbital parameters
- Reference system: Geocentric orbit
- Regime: Low Earth orbit
- Periapsis altitude: 575.6 km
- Apoapsis altitude: 590.3 km
- Inclination: 62.0 °
- Period: 96.2 minutes
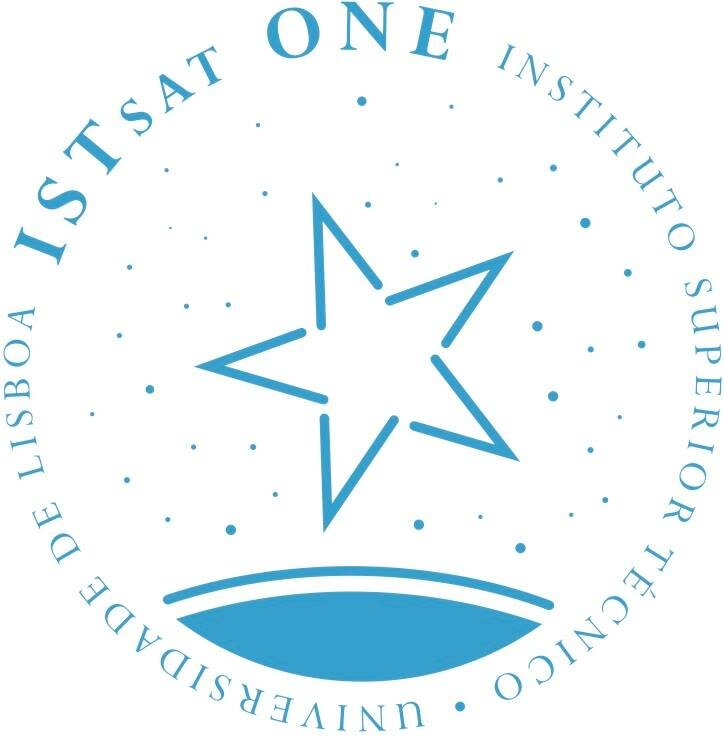
- Fly Your Satellite!

The ISTSat-1 is a Portuguese nanosatellite developed by students and researchers of the Instituto Superior Técnico (University of Lisbon), that was launched into orbit on 9 July 2024, aboard the Ariane 6 maiden flight. The project is part of the European Space Agency's "Fly Your Satellite!" programme. It is the third Portuguese satellite in space, after the PoSAT-1 and the AEROS MH-1, and the first to have been entirely designed and built in Portugal.

The ISTSat-1 is a CubeSat developed to optimise and complement aircraft surveillance systems by demonstrating the Automatic Dependent Surveillance-Broadcast (ADS-B) aircraft detection technology in orbit. Its mission lifetime is expected to be 12 months.

== See also ==
- Instituto Superior Técnico
- European Space Agency
