= Starlette and Stella =

French geodetic and geophysical satellites

Starlette
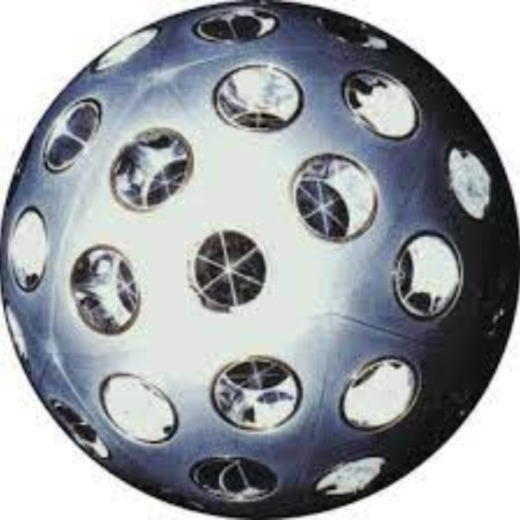
- Names: Satellite de taille adaptée avec réflecteurs laser pour les études de la terre
- Mission type: Scientific
- Operator: CNES
- Harvard designation: 1975-010A
- COSPAR ID: 1975-010A
- SATCAT no.: 7646
- Mission duration: Elapsed: 51 years, 3 months and 7 days

Spacecraft properties
- Manufacturer: CNES
- Launch mass: 47 kg (104 lb)

Start of mission
- Launch date: 6 February 1975, 16:35 UTC
- Rocket: Diamant BP4
- Launch site: Guiana Space Centre

Orbital parameters
- Reference system: Geocentric
- Regime: Low Earth
- Eccentricity: 0.0206
- Perigee altitude: 812 km (505 mi)
- Apogee altitude: 1,114 km (692 mi)
- Inclination: 49.83 degrees
- Period: 104 minutes

Stella
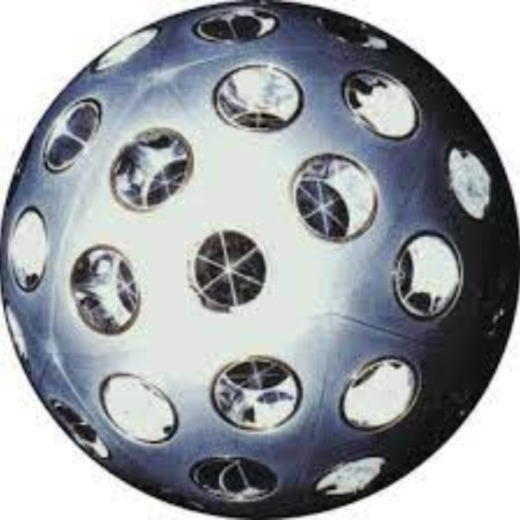
- Mission type: Scientific
- Operator: CNES
- Harvard designation: 1993-061B
- COSPAR ID: 1993-061B
- SATCAT no.: 22824
- Mission duration: Elapsed: 32 years, 7 months and 18 days

Spacecraft properties
- Manufacturer: CNES
- Launch mass: 48 kg (106 lb)

Start of mission
- Launch date: 26 September 1993, 01:45:00 UTC
- Rocket: Ariane 4
- Launch site: Guiana Space Centre

Orbital parameters
- Reference system: Geocentric
- Regime: Low Earth
- Eccentricity: 0.0006
- Perigee altitude: 804 km (500 mi)
- Apogee altitude: 812 km (505 mi)
- Inclination: 98.68 degrees
- Period: 101 minutes

Starlette (Satellite de taille adaptée avec réflecteurs laser pour les études de la terre, or lit. 'Satellite of suitable size with laser reflectors for studies of the earth') and Stella are nearly identical French geodetic and geophysical satellites. Starlette was launched on 6 February 1975 and Stella on 26 September 1993. Starlette was the first passive laser satellite developed.

== Background ==
Starlette's development dates back to at least 1972, when scientists at the Centre national d'études spatiales (CNES) were trying to determine a payload for the upcoming first flight of the new Diamant BP4 rocket. After consulting with the Smithsonian Astrophysical Observatory, CNES scientists decided to create a small geodetic satellite optimized for tracking by laser ranging. The project was approved within a few months after a feasibility study by the French atomic agency CEA determined the dense uranium core could be made nearly non-radioactive by using depleted uranium.

The Groupe de recherches en géodésie spatiale (GRGS; Space Geodesy Research Group) first proposed Stella to provide coverage for areas missed by Starlette.

== Spacecraft design ==
Starlette and Stella are nearly identical, small spherical spacecraft measuring 24 centimetres (9.4 in) in diameter. With masses of 47 kilograms (104 lb) and 48 kilograms (106 lb) respectively, the satellites are quite dense. This high-density spherical design reduced the drag effect of aerobraking on the satellites as they exited Earth's atmosphere. Both satellites are covered in 60 laser retroreflectors.

== Mission and results ==
Starlette was launched on 6 February 1975 at 16:35 UTC by a Diamant BP4 rocket from the B launch pad at the Guiana Space Centre in Korou, French Guiana. It was the first flight of a Diamant BP4 launch vehicle.

Stella was launched on 26 September 1993 at 01:45:00 UTC by an Ariane 4 (Ariane 40 H-10) rocket from the ELA-2 launch pad at the Guiana Space Centre as part of a payload also containing the satellites SPOT-3, KITSAT-2, Itamsat, Eyesat-1, PoSAT-1, and Healthsat-2. The payload was located in the top part of the Ariane rocket's third stage.

In the 1980s, data gathered by Starlette was used to develop a model of global ocean tides.

== Legacy and status ==
Starlette was the first passive laser satellite developed. The first of two American geodetic satellites called LAGEOS followed not long after in 1976.

Both satellites were in orbit as of 2023. They are expected to remain in orbit up to 2000 years and to remain trackable for many decades or centuries.

== See also ==
- Satellite laser ranging
- French space program
- Timeline of artificial satellites and space probes
