= James Oberg =

Space flight expert (born 1944)

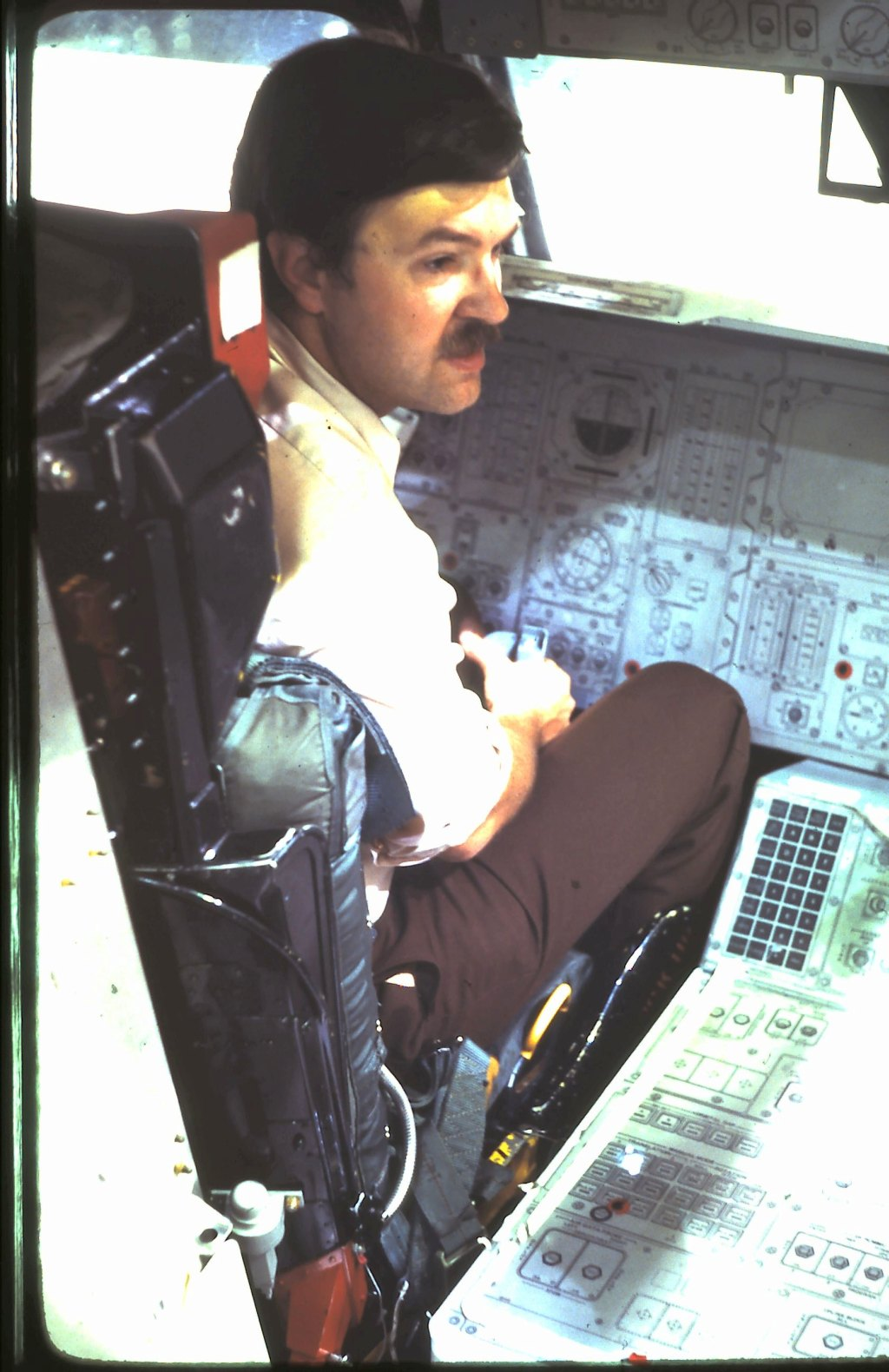
- Oberg at the Johnson Space Center in 1978
- Born: November 7, 1944 (age 82); New York City, United States
- Education: Ohio Wesleyan University, B.A. mathematics, 1966; Northwestern University, M.S. applied mathematics (astrodynamics), 1969; University of New Mexico, M.S. computer science, 1972
- Occupations: Journalist, historian, author
- Spouse: Alcestis (married 1969–present)
- Children: 2
- Awards: See Awards
- Website: www.jamesoberg.com

James Edward Oberg (born November 7, 1944) is an American space journalist and historian, regarded as an expert on the Russian and Chinese space programs. He had a 22-year career as a space engineer in NASA specializing in orbital rendezvous. Oberg is an author of ten books and more than a thousand articles on space flight. He has provided multiple explanations of UFO phenomena for media outlets. He is also a consultant in spaceflight operations and safety.

== Early life and education ==
James Oberg was born in New York City on November 7, 1944.

He received a B.A. in Mathematics from Ohio Wesleyan University in 1966, a M.S. in applied mathematics (astrodynamics) from Northwestern University in 1969 (where he was also a NASA Trainee) and a M.S. in computer science from University of New Mexico in 1972.

== US Air Force ==
At Northwestern University he started Ph.D. work in Mathematics, but was called to active duty by the United States Air Force in 1970. There he worked with modeling laser and nuclear weapons and in the years 1972–1975, while working in the Department of Defense Computer Institute, he helped design and test ARPANET, precursor to the Internet.

== NASA ==
After service in the United States Air Force, he joined NASA in 1975, where he worked until 1997 at Johnson Space Center on the Space Shuttle program. He worked in the Mission Control Center for several Space Shuttle missions from STS-1 on, specializing in orbital rendezvous techniques. This culminated in planning the orbit for the STS-88 mission, the first International Space Station (ISS) assembly flight.

During the 1990s, he was involved in NASA studies of the Soviet space program, with particular emphasis on safety aspects; these had often been covered up or downplayed, and with the advent of the ISS and the Shuttle–Mir programs, NASA was keen to study them as much as possible. He privately published several books on the Soviet (and later Russian) programs, and became one of the few Western specialists on Russian space history.

He has often been called to testify before the US Congress on the Russian space program.

In 1997 he voluntarily resigned from NASA and started a full-time free-lance career. Currently he works as a consultant in spaceflight operations and safety and as a space journalist.

== Author and journalist ==
As a journalist, Oberg writes for several publications, mostly online; he was previously a space correspondent or commentator for UPI, ABC News and currently MSNBC, often in an on-air role. He is a Fellow of the skeptical organization CSICOP and a consultant to its magazine Skeptical Inquirer.

He has written more than a thousand magazine and newspaper articles, including such magazines as The Wall Street Journal, USA Today, Scientific American, OMNI, Popular Science, Popular Mechanics, New Scientist, IEEE Spectrum, Air Force Magazine, Star and Sky, etc.

Oberg is also a space consultant and on-air commentator to NBC News, Discovery Canada and the BBC.

In December 1990, Horizon, a British television science and philosophy television documentary program, aired a three-part series, "Red Star in Orbit," based on Oberg's book of the same name. WGBH Boston adapted the Horizon series for its Nova television science series, a three-part miniseries titled "The Russian Right Stuff," which aired in February 1991. HBO has optioned Red Star in Orbit for a future production. Also in 1991, Oberg launched a battle for official recognition of Robert Henry Lawrence, Jr. (1935–1967) as a United States astronaut; the United States Air Force officially recognized Lawrence in January 1997, six years after Oberg had begun his campaign.

In 1999, Oberg wrote Space Power Theory, sponsored by United States military as a part of an official campaign in changing perceptions of space warfare, specifically deployment and use of weapons in outer space, and its political implications. "In Oberg's view, space is not an extension of air warfare but is unique in itself."

James Oberg is an author of ten books in addition to several technical NASA publications.

He also wrote encyclopedia articles on space exploration in the World Book Encyclopedia, Britannica yearbook, Grolier and Academic American Encyclopedia.

== Moon landing conspiracies ==
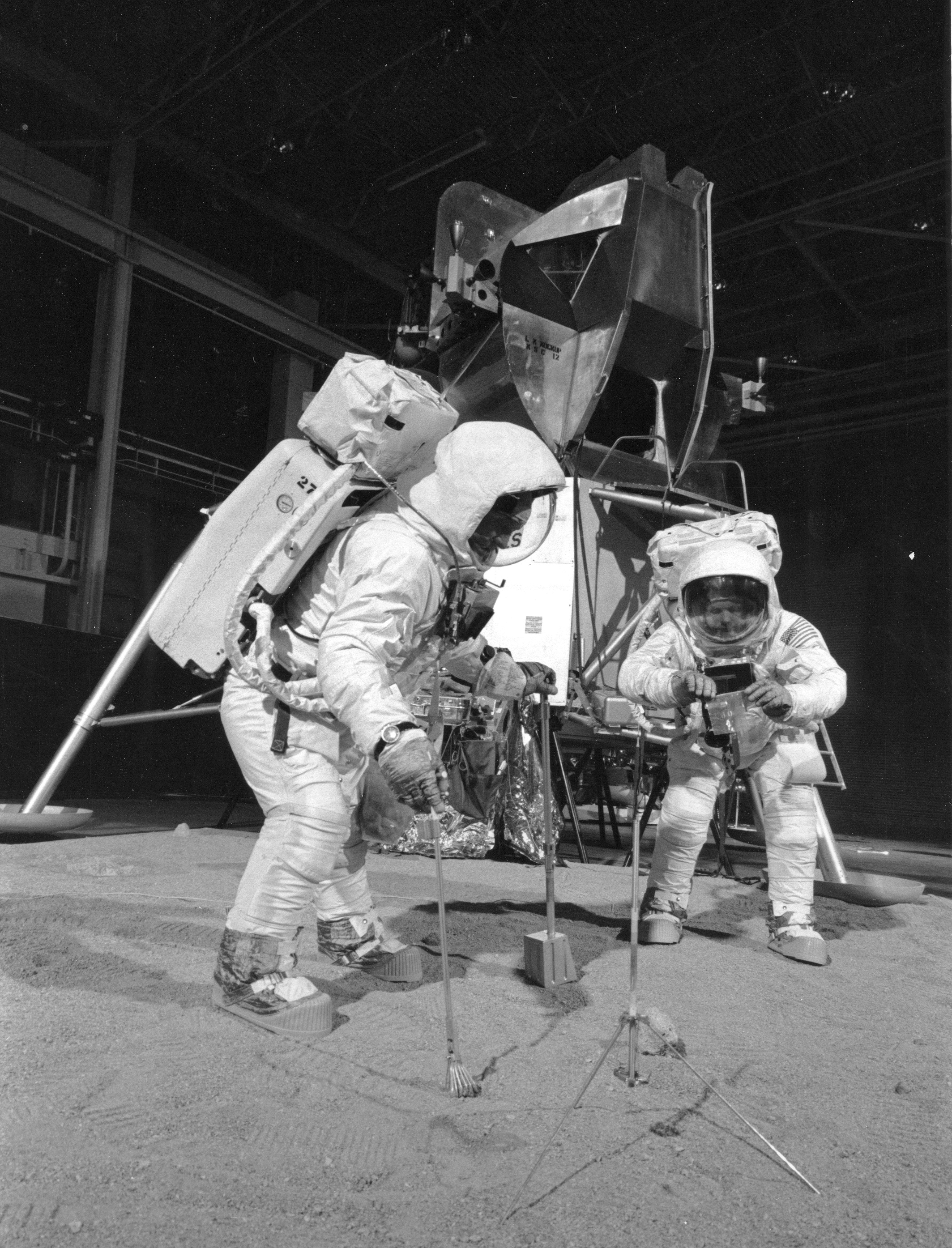
One of the photos taken during a simulation used by conspiracy theorists

Oberg was commissioned by NASA to write a rebuttal of Apollo Moon landing conspiracy theories. However, NASA dropped the project after ABC's World News Tonight program ran a story about it, claiming it was beneath NASA's dignity to respond to Moon landing denialists claims. Oberg has said that he still intends to pursue the project, "depending on successfully arranging new funding sources."

Oberg writes that Moon landing conspiracy theories are fueled by resentment of American culture by some countries. He gives the example of Cuba, where he claims many school teachers say the landing was a fraud. But besides this, the new wave of conspiracy theorists appear to use alternative publication methods to publicize their claims.

Oberg says that belief in the conspiracy is not the fault of the hoaxists, but rather of educators and people (including NASA) who should provide information to the public. NASA does not, in Oberg's opinion, provide an adequate reaction to the theorists' claims.

== North Korean satellite launch inspection ==
In April 2012 Oberg traveled to North Korea as an NBC space consultant to observe the launching of the Kwangmyŏngsŏng-3 satellite and determine whether it is a military launch. Together with a team of journalists he inspected the Sohae Satellite Launching Station, the Unha rocket and the satellite. According to Oberg, North Korea "showed everything but the important things" and did not manage to demonstrate peaceful intent.

== UFO investigation ==
James Oberg often writes about alleged UFO sightings, giving scientific explanations to seemingly extraterrestrial phenomena, or otherwise debunking them as hoaxes.

Oberg categorized UFO sightings, excluding those identified as hoaxes, into one of three groups:

1. Super-High Plumes – rocket or missile plumes, especially lit by the Sun on a dark sky;
2. Space "Dandruff" – ice flakes, fragments of insulation, etc. flying alongside a space vehicle, especially seen by backward-facing cameras;
3. Twilight Shadowing – objects that move from shadow into sunlight in space appear as if coming from behind the clouds or from beyond the edge of the Earth.

=== List of UFO explanations ===
Date	Phenomenon	Explanation
February 20, 1962	John Glenn in the Mercury capsule saw three objects following and then overtaking the capsule	Small space debris – "snowflakes"
May 24, 1962	Scott Carpenter in Mercury-Atlas 7 photographs "a saucer"	Tracking balloon ejected from the capsule
May 30, 1962	X-15 pilot Joe Walton photographed five discs	Complete fabrication by ufologists; pilot's actual name was Joseph A. Walker
July 17, 1962	X-15 pilot Robert Michael White photographed objects close to the plane	Small objects, probably ice flakes from fuel tanks
October 3, 1962	Walter Schirra on Mercury-Atlas 8 reported large glowing objects over the Indian Ocean	Lightning-lit cloud masses, misquotations
May 16, 1963	Gordon Cooper on Mercury-Atlas 9 reports a greenish UFO and other mysterious sightings	Fabrications, misquotations
March 8, 1964	Russian cosmonauts on Voskhod 2 report an UFO while entering Earth's atmosphere	Probably man-made satellite
October 12, 1964	Three Russian cosmonauts report being surrounded by fast moving discs	Complete fabrication
June 3, 1965	Gemini 4 UFOs	Exaggerations and misquotations by ufologists
December 4, 1965	Frank Borman and Jim Lovell on Gemini 7 photographed two oval-shaped UFOs	Complete fabrication
December 9, 1965	Kecksburg UFO incident	Kosmos 96 satellite, explanation later disproved
July 18, 1966	John Young and Michael Collins on Gemini 10 photographed a large cylindrical object accompanied by two smaller	Fabrication – no photos were taken, astronauts reported bright fragments near their spacecraft, probably pieces of the booster of some other satellite
September 12, 1966	Richard F. Gordon, Jr. and Pete Conrad on Gemini 11 report and photograph a yellow-orange UFO	A satellite
November 11, 1966	Jim Lovell and Buzz Aldrin on Gemini 12 report 4 UFOs linked in a row	Discarded trash bags; misquotations
December 21, 1968	Frank Borman and Jim Lovell on Apollo 8 report a "bogie" (an unidentified object)	Misplaced quotations, pieces of debris associated with separation from the booster rocket
May 1969	Apollo 10 'space music'	Radio interference between the Command Module and the Lunar Module landing vehicles
July 1969	Apollo 11 UFO incidents	Complete fabrication of photos and transcripts; all data available to the public
November 14, 1969	Pete Conrad, Alan Bean and Richard Gordon on Apollo 12 report a UFO preceding them on the path to the Moon	Misunderstood the meaning of conversation with ground control; reflection of the Moon
September 20, 1973	Skylab 3 UFO Photographs	Space debris
February 12, 1980	UFO observed over the Cerro Tololo Inter-American Observatory in Chile	Kosmos 1164 launch from Plesetsk Cosmodrome
June 14, 1980	UFO over Russia and then South America	Kosmos 1188 satellite launch
October 31, 1981	UFO over Argentina and Chile	Kosmos 1317 satellite launch
September 7, 1984	UFO observed in eastern Europe	SS-X-25 ICBM test launch
January 1989; March 1989	Phobos 2 spacecraft photographs mysterious structures on the surface of Mars	Shadow of Phobos moon elongated due to slow acquisition of the image by scanning radiometer
November 5, 1990	UFO observed by airline crews	Re-entry of the Proton-K rocket carrying Gorizont 33 satellite across France and Germany
September 15, 1991	STS-48: several objects appearing	Ice particles hit by a thruster plume
January 28, 1994	UFO observed by airline crews	Launch of Progress M-21 spacecraft
December 2, 1996	STS-80 unusual phenomena	Nearby sunlit debris
December 1998	STS-88 "Black Knight" or "Phantom Satellite"	Insulation blanket dropped by astronauts

== Russian pistol aboard ISS ==
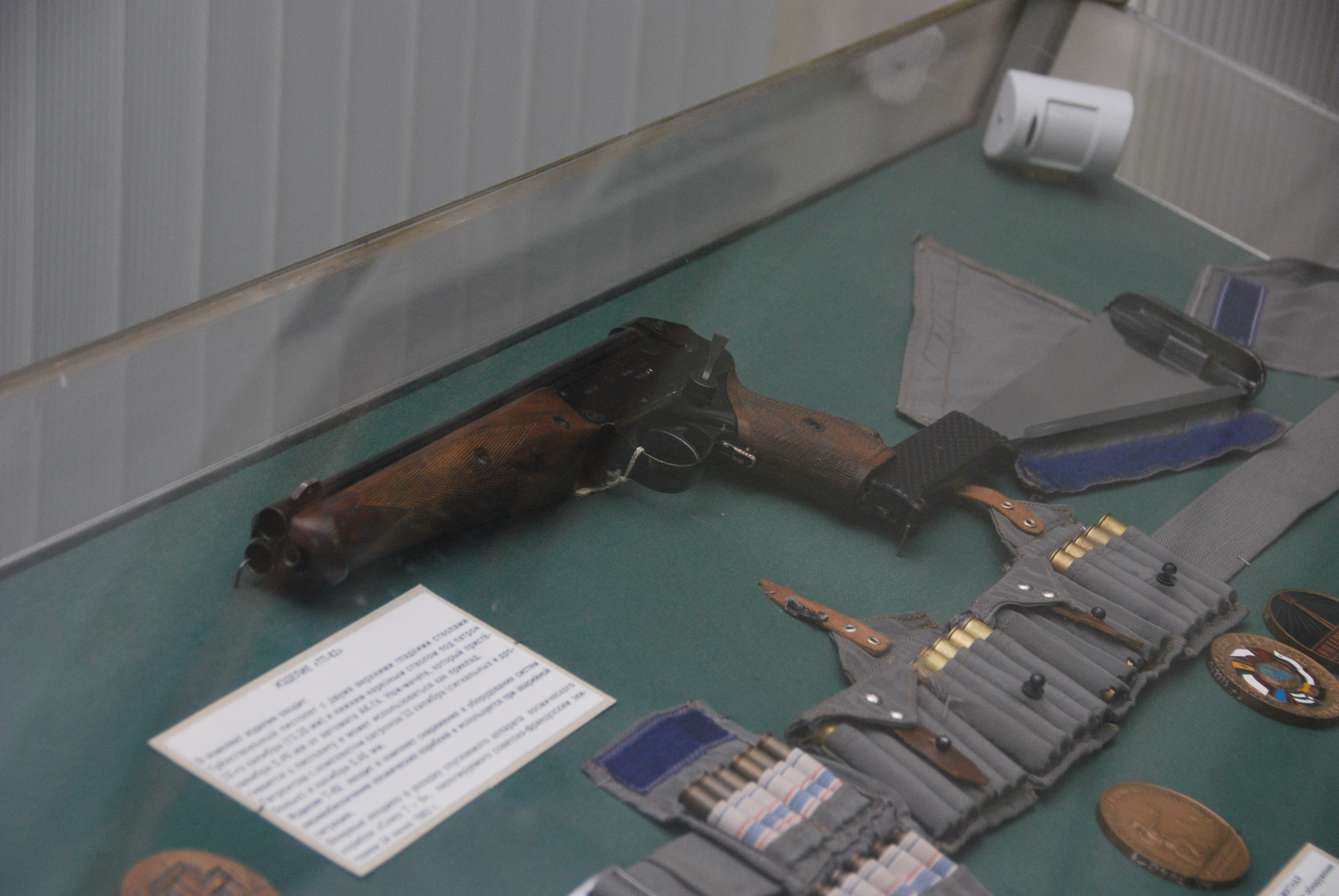
Triple-barreled TP-82 Cosmonaut survival pistol in Saint-Petersburg Artillery museum

James Oberg wrote several articles as a publicity campaign to remove guns from the ISS. The TP-82 Cosmonaut survival pistol was stowed in the Soyuz emergency landing survival kit and was added there for hunting and self-defense after landing in inhospitable environment. It had three barrels and a folding stock that doubled as a shovel and contained a machete. The gun was only carried by Russian members of the ISS. Oberg suggested that it might be an invitation to a future disaster and proposed it to be put in a compartment accessible only from outside, after landing.

In 2014 Oberg asked Samantha Cristoforetti, an Italian ISS astronaut, about the pistol and she admitted the gun is removed from the list, or more precisely, it is still on the official list of kit contents, but the committee meets before every mission to review the list and vote to remove the pistol for the specific flight.

== Private life ==
Oberg has been married since 1969 and lives with his wife Alcestis in Dickinson, Texas. He has two grown sons (born 1977 and 1984).

He has a conversant knowledge of Russian, French and Latin, and has some familiarity with German, Swedish, Spanish, Kazakh and Japanese.

== Awards and memberships ==
- First place in Goddard National Space Award (twice)
- 1st and 2nd place awards from the American Society of Business Publication Editors (May 2000)
- The winner of the New Scientist award: Cutty Sark Whisky essay on UFO
- Fellow of the skeptical organization the Committee for Skeptical Inquiry
- Fellow of the British Interplanetary Society
- Fellow of the Russian Academy of Cosmonautics (the first foreign member)
- Fellow of the American Institute of Aeronautics and Astronautics

== Bibliography ==
=== Popular publications ===
1. Oberg, James; Edmondson, Harold (1979). Famous Spaceships of Fact and Fantasy. Kalmbach Publishing Company. ISBN 978-0890245392.
2. Oberg, James (1981). New Earths: Restructuring Earth and Other Planets. Foreword by Jack Williamson. Harrisburg, PA: Stackpole Books. ISBN 978-0-452-00623-2.
3. Oberg, James (1981). Red Star in Orbit. Foreword by Tom Wolfe. New York: Random House. ISBN 978-0-394-51429-1.
4. Oberg, James (1982). Mission to Mars: Plans and Concepts for the First Manned Landing. Foreword by G. Harry Stine. Harrisburg, PA: Stackpole Books. ISBN 978-0-81170-432-8.
5. Oberg, James (1982). UFO's and Outer Space Mysteries: A Sympathetic Skeptic's Report. Norfolk, VA: Donning Company Publishers. ISBN 978-0-89865-102-7.
6. Oberg, James (1984). The New Race for Space: The U.S. and Russia Leap to the Challenge for Unlimited Rewards. Foreword by Ben Bova. Harrisburg, PA: Stackpole Books. ISBN 978-0-8117-2177-6.
7. Oberg, James; Oberg, Alcestis R. (1986). Pioneering Space: Living on the Next Frontier. Foreword by Isaac Asimov. New York: McGraw-Hill. ISBN 978-0-07-048039-1.
8. Oberg, James (1988). Uncovering Soviet Disasters: Exploring the Limits of Glasnost. New York: Random House. ISBN 978-0-394-56095-3.
9. Oberg, James; Sullivan, Brian R. (1999). Space Power Theory. Introductions by Colin S. Gray and Howell M. Estes III. Colorado Springs, CO: US Air Force Academy. OCLC 41145918.
10. Oberg, James (2001). Star-Crossed Orbits: Inside the U.S.-Russian Space Alliance. New York: McGraw-Hill. ISBN 978-0-07137-425-5.
11. Oberg, James (2017). It's vital to verify the harmlessness of North Korea's next satellite. Texas: TheSpaceReview.

=== Other books ===
- The Mars Conquest
- Red Stars in Orbit

=== Technical materials for NASA ===
- Space Shuttle Mission Control Center: Overview of Information and Decision Flows (for McDonnell Douglas);
- Rendezvous and Proximity Operations Handbook;
- History of Orbital Rendezvous;
- Flight Data File: Crew Procedures, STS-32 LDEF Retrieval;
- Console Handbook, Rendezvous Guidance and Procedures Officer;
- Training Guide, Rendezvous Guidance and Procedures Handbook
