= Eyesat-1 =

Amateur radio satellite

Eyesat A
- Mission type: Amateur radio satellite
- COSPAR ID: 1993-061C
- SATCAT no.: 22825
- Mission duration: Elasped: 32 years, 7 months and 18 days

Spacecraft properties
- Bus: Microsat
- Manufacturer: Interferometrics Inc.
- Launch mass: 11.8 kg (26 lb)
- Dimensions: 15 cm × 15 cm × 15 cm (5.9 in × 5.9 in × 5.9 in)

Start of mission
- Launch date: 26 September 1993, 01:45 UTC
- Rocket: Ariane-40 V59
- Launch site: Kourou ELA-2
- Contractor: Arianespace

Orbital parameters
- Reference system: Geocentric
- Regime: Low Earth
- Eccentricity: 0.00202
- Periapsis altitude: 794 km (493 mi)
- Apoapsis altitude: 823 km (511 mi)
- Inclination: 98.5°
- Period: 101 minutes
- Epoch: 26 September 1993
- Error: no value specified for required parameter "apsis"

Eyesat-A was launched on September 26, 1993 using an Ariane 4 rocket at Guiana Space Centre, Kourou, French Guiana, along with SPOT-3, Stella, Healthsat-2, KITSAT-2, and PoSAT-1.
