= Progress M-18 =

Russian uncrewed cargo spacecraft

- Mission type: Mir resupply
- COSPAR ID: 1993-034A
- SATCAT no.: 22666

Spacecraft properties
- Spacecraft type: Progress-M 11F615A55
- Manufacturer: NPO Energia
- Launch mass: 7,250 kilograms (15,980 lb)

Start of mission
- Launch date: 22 May 1993, 06:41:47 UTC
- Rocket: Soyuz-U2
- Launch site: Baikonur Site 1/5

End of mission
- Disposal: Deorbited
- Decay date: 4 July 1993

Orbital parameters
- Reference system: Geocentric
- Regime: Low Earth
- Perigee altitude: 388 kilometres (241 mi)
- Apogee altitude: 390 kilometres (240 mi)
- Inclination: 51.6 degrees

Docking with Mir
- Docking port: Core Forward
- Docking date: 24 May 1993, 08:24:44 UTC
- Undocking date: 3 July 1993, 15:58:16 UTC
- Time docked: 40 days

Progress M-18 (Russian: Прогресс М-18) was a Russian cargo uncrewed spacecraft which was launched in 1993 to resupply the Mir space station. The thirty-sixth of sixty four Progress spacecraft to visit Mir, it used the Progress-M 11F615A55 configuration, and had the serial number 218. It carried supplies including food, water and oxygen for the EO-13 crew aboard Mir, as well as equipment for conducting scientific research, and fuel for adjusting the station's orbit and performing manoeuvres.

Progress M-18 was launched at 06:41:47 GMT on 22 May 1993, atop a Soyuz-U2 carrier rocket flying from Site 1/5 at the Baikonur Cosmodrome. It was the last Progress spacecraft to be launched on a Soyuz-U2. Following two days of free flight, it docked with the Forward port of Mir's core module at 08:24:44 GMT on 24 May.

During the 40 days for which Progress M-18 was docked, Mir was in an orbit of around 388 by 390 kilometres (210 by 211 nmi), inclined at 51.6 degrees. Progress M-18 undocked from Mir at 15:58:16 GMT on 3 July; less than half an hour before Soyuz TM-17 docked with the port which it had vacated. It was deorbited around a day later, to a destructive reentry over the Pacific Ocean. Before undocking, a VBK-Raduga capsule launched aboard Progress M-17 had been installed on Progress M-18, and this separated once the deorbit burn was complete. The capsule landed successfully at 17:13 GMT.

== See also ==
- 1993 in spaceflight
- List of Progress flights
- List of uncrewed spaceflights to Mir
