= Progress M-10 =

Soviet turned Russian robotic spacecraft

- Mission type: Mir resupply
- COSPAR ID: 1991-073A
- SATCAT no.: 21746

Spacecraft properties
- Spacecraft type: Progress-M 11F615A55
- Manufacturer: NPO Energia
- Launch mass: 7,250 kilograms (15,980 lb)

Start of mission
- Launch date: 17 October 1991, 00:05:25 UTC
- Rocket: Soyuz-U2
- Launch site: Baikonur Site 1/5

End of mission
- Disposal: Deorbited
- Decay date: 20 January 1992

Orbital parameters
- Reference system: Geocentric
- Regime: Low Earth
- Perigee altitude: 376 kilometres (234 mi)
- Apogee altitude: 377 kilometres (234 mi)
- Inclination: 51.6 degrees

Docking with Mir
- Docking port: Core Forward
- Docking date: 21 October 1991, 03:40:50 UTC
- Undocking date: 20 January 1992, 07:13:44 UTC
- Time docked: 91 days

Progress M-10 (Russian: Прогресс М-10) was a Soviet and subsequently Russian uncrewed cargo spacecraft which was launched in 1991 to resupply the Mir space station. The 28th of 64 Progress spacecraft to visit Mir, it used the Progress-M 11F615A55 configuration, and had the serial number 211. It carried supplies including food, water, and oxygen for the EO-10 crew aboard Mir, as well as equipment for conducting scientific research, and fuel for adjusting the station's orbit and performing manoeuvres. It carried the fourth VBK-Raduga capsule, which was used to return experiment results and equipment to Earth when the Progress was deorbited.

Progress M-10 was launched at 00:05:25 GMT on 17 October 1991, atop a Soyuz-U2 carrier rocket flying from Site 1/5 at the Baikonur Cosmodrome. Following four days of free flight, it docked with the forward port of the core module on the second attempt, at 03:40:50 GMT on 21 October. The first attempt had been aborted by the Progress' onboard computer when the spacecraft was 150 metres (490 ft) away from the station.

During the 91 days for which Progress M-10 was docked, Mir was in an orbit of around 376 by 377 kilometres (203 by 204 nmi), inclined at 51.6 degrees. It was launched by the Soviet Union, which was dissolved in December 1991, and along with most aspects of the Soviet space programme, Progress M-10 was inherited by Russia. It undocked from Mir at 07:13:44 GMT on 20 January 1992, and was deorbited few hours later to a destructive reentry over the Pacific Ocean. The Raduga capsule landed at 12:03:30 GMT.

== See also ==
- 1991 in spaceflight
- 1992 in spaceflight
- List of Progress flights
- List of uncrewed spaceflights to Mir
