= Progress M-9 =

Unmanned Soviet cargo spacecraft

- Mission type: Mir resupply
- COSPAR ID: 1991-057A
- SATCAT no.: 21662

Spacecraft properties
- Spacecraft type: Progress-M 11F615A55
- Manufacturer: NPO Energia
- Launch mass: 7,250 kilograms (15,980 lb)

Start of mission
- Launch date: 20 August 1991, 22:54:10 UTC
- Rocket: Soyuz-U2
- Launch site: Baikonur Site 1/5

End of mission
- Disposal: Deorbited
- Decay date: 30 September 1991

Orbital parameters
- Reference system: Geocentric
- Regime: Low Earth
- Perigee altitude: 379 kilometres (235 mi)
- Apogee altitude: 396 kilometres (246 mi)
- Inclination: 51.6 degrees

Docking with Mir
- Docking port: Core Forward
- Docking date: 23 August 1991, 00:54:17 UTC
- Undocking date: 30 September 1991, 01:53:00 UTC
- Time docked: 38 days

Progress M-9 (Russian: Прогресс М-9) was a Soviet uncrewed cargo spacecraft which was launched in 1991 to resupply the Mir space station. The twenty-seventh of sixty four Progress spacecraft to visit Mir, it used the Progress-M 11F615A55 configuration, and had the serial number 210. It carried supplies including food, water and oxygen for the EO-9 crew aboard Mir, as well as equipment for conducting scientific research, and fuel for adjusting the station's orbit and performing manoeuvres. It was the third Progress spacecraft to carry a VBK-Raduga capsule, which was used to return equipment and experiment results to Earth.

Progress M-9 was launched at 22:54:10 GMT on 20 August 1991, atop a Soyuz-U2 carrier rocket flying from Site 1/5 at the Baikonur Cosmodrome. Following two days of free flight, it docked with the forward port of Mir's core module at 00:54:17 GMT on 23 August.

During the thirty eight days for which Progress M-9 was docked, Mir was in an orbit of approximately 379 by 396 kilometres (205 by 214 nmi), inclined at 51.6 degrees. Progress M-9 undocked from Mir at 01:53:00 GMT on 30 September, and was deorbited few hours later at 07:45, to a destructive reentry over the Pacific Ocean. The Raduga capsule landed in the Kazakh Soviet Socialist Republic at 08:16:24 GMT.

== See also ==
- 1991 in spaceflight
- List of Progress flights
- List of uncrewed spaceflights to Mir
