= Black Knight satellite conspiracy theory =

Alleged Earth satellite of extraterrestrial origin

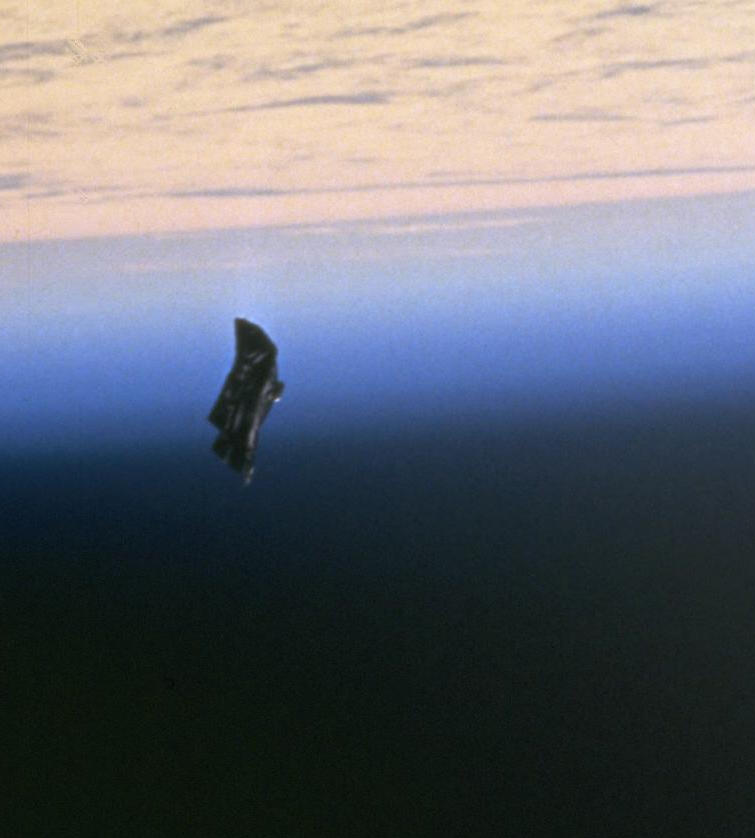
1998 NASA photo of space debris, an object believed by some conspiracy theorists to be an extraterrestrial satellite, the Black Knight

GIF of the six images taken of the space debris, a thermal blanket, showing what appears to be its descent to Earth

The Black Knight satellite conspiracy theory claims that a spacecraft of extraterrestrial origin is in near-polar orbit of the Earth, and that NASA is covering up its existence and origin. This conspiracy theory combines several unrelated stories into one narrative.

A photo taken during the December 1998 STS-88 mission, claimed by some to show the Black Knight satellite, is catalogued by NASA as a photo of space debris. Space journalist James Oberg explains it as a thermal blanket confirmed as lost during the mission.

== History ==
According to some UFO conspiracists, the Black Knight is an artificial satellite of extraterrestrial origin that has orbited Earth for approximately 13,000 years; the "satellite" story is most likely a conflation of several disconnected stories about various objects and their interpretations, all of them well documented independently and none using the term Black Knight upon their first publication. According to senior education support officer Martina Redpath of Armagh Planetarium in Northern Ireland:

Black Knight is a jumble of completely unrelated stories; reports of unusual science observations, authors promoting fringe ideas, classified spy satellites and people over-interpreting photos. These ingredients have been chopped up, stirred together and stewed on the internet to one rambling and inconsistent dollop of myth.

The origin of the Black Knight legend is often "retrospectively dated" back to natural extraterrestrial repeating sources supposedly heard during the 1899 radio experiments of Nikola Tesla and long delayed echoes first heard by amateur radio operator Jørgen Hals in Oslo, Norway, in 1928. Brian Dunning of the Skeptoid podcast attributes Tesla's 1899 radio signals to pulsars, which were not identified until 1968.

In 1954, UFO researcher Donald Keyhoe told newspapers that the United States Air Force had reported that two satellites orbiting Earth had been detected. At that time, no country had the technology to launch a satellite. Skeptics have noted that Keyhoe had been promoting a UFO book at the time, and posited that the news stories were likely written "tongue-in-cheek" and not intended to be taken seriously.

A British rocket called the Black Knight rocket was used in conjunction with the Blue Streak missile program between 1958 and 1965, to test re-entry vehicles. A "Black Knight satellite launcher" project announced in 1964 was considered a priority by the Ministry of Aviation. The program never put anything into orbit, and it is unrelated to the Black Knight satellite legend.

In February 1960, Time reported that the U.S. Navy had detected a dark object thought to be a Soviet spy satellite in orbit. A follow-up article confirmed that the object was "the remains of an Air Force Discoverer 8 satellite that had gone astray."

In 1963, astronaut Gordon Cooper supposedly reported a UFO sighting during his 15th orbit in Mercury 9 that was confirmed by tracking stations, but there is no evidence that this happened. Neither NASA's mission transcripts nor Cooper's personal copies show any such report being made during the orbit.

In 1973, Scottish author Duncan Lunan analysed the long delayed radio echoes received by Hals and others and speculated that they could possibly originate from a 13,000-year-old alien probe located in an orbit around the Earth's Moon. He suggested that the probe may have originated from a planet located in the planetary system of star Epsilon Boötis. Lunan later retracted his conclusions, saying that he had made "outright errors" and that his methods had been "unscientific".

Space debris photographed in 1998 during the STS-88 mission has been widely claimed to be the Black Knight satellite. Space journalist James Oberg considers it probable that the photographs are of a thermal blanket that was confirmed as lost during an EVA by Jerry L. Ross and James H. Newman.
