= VBK-Raduga =

- МКБ-Радуга
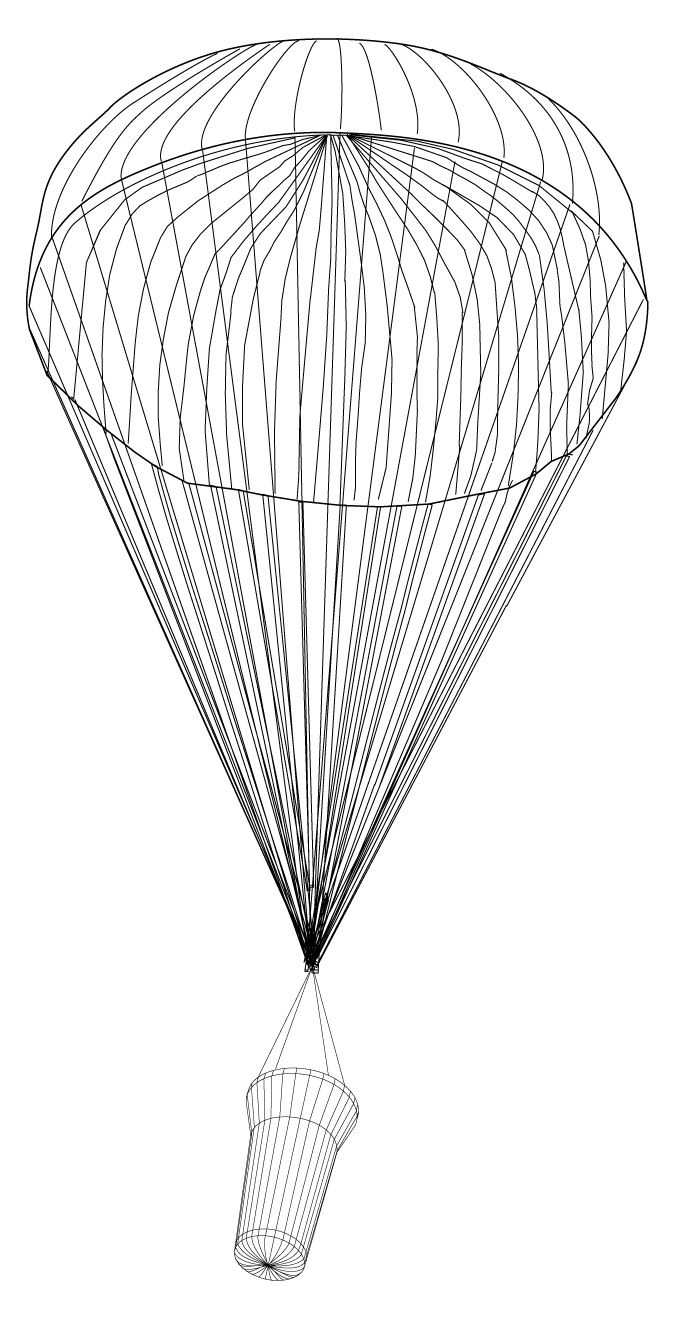
- Raduga NASA illustration of a VBK-Raduga ballistic return capsule during final descent to Earth.
- Type: Reentry capsule

Specifications
- Dimensions: 1.5m long, 60cm diameter
- Dry mass: 350kg

History
- Launched: from Baikonur Cosmodrome
- First flight: September 27, 1990
- Last flight: April 9, 1995

The VBK-Raduga capsule was a reentry capsule that was used for returning materials to Earth's surface from the space station Mir. They were brought to Mir in the Progress-M cargo craft's dry cargo compartment. For return, the capsule would be substituted for the Progress' docking probe before it left the space station, and then after the Progress-M performed its deorbit burn, the capsule was ejected at 120 km altitude to reenter the atmosphere independently. It would then parachute to a landing area in Russia.

Each Raduga was about 1.5 m long, 60 cm in diameter, and had an unloaded mass of about 350 kg. It could return about 150 kg of cargo back to Earth. Use of the Raduga reduced the Progress-M's cargo capacity by about 100 kg, to a maximum of about 2400 kg.

The European Space Agency studied a very similar system called PARES (Payload Retrieval System), for use in combination with the Automated Transfer Vehicle.

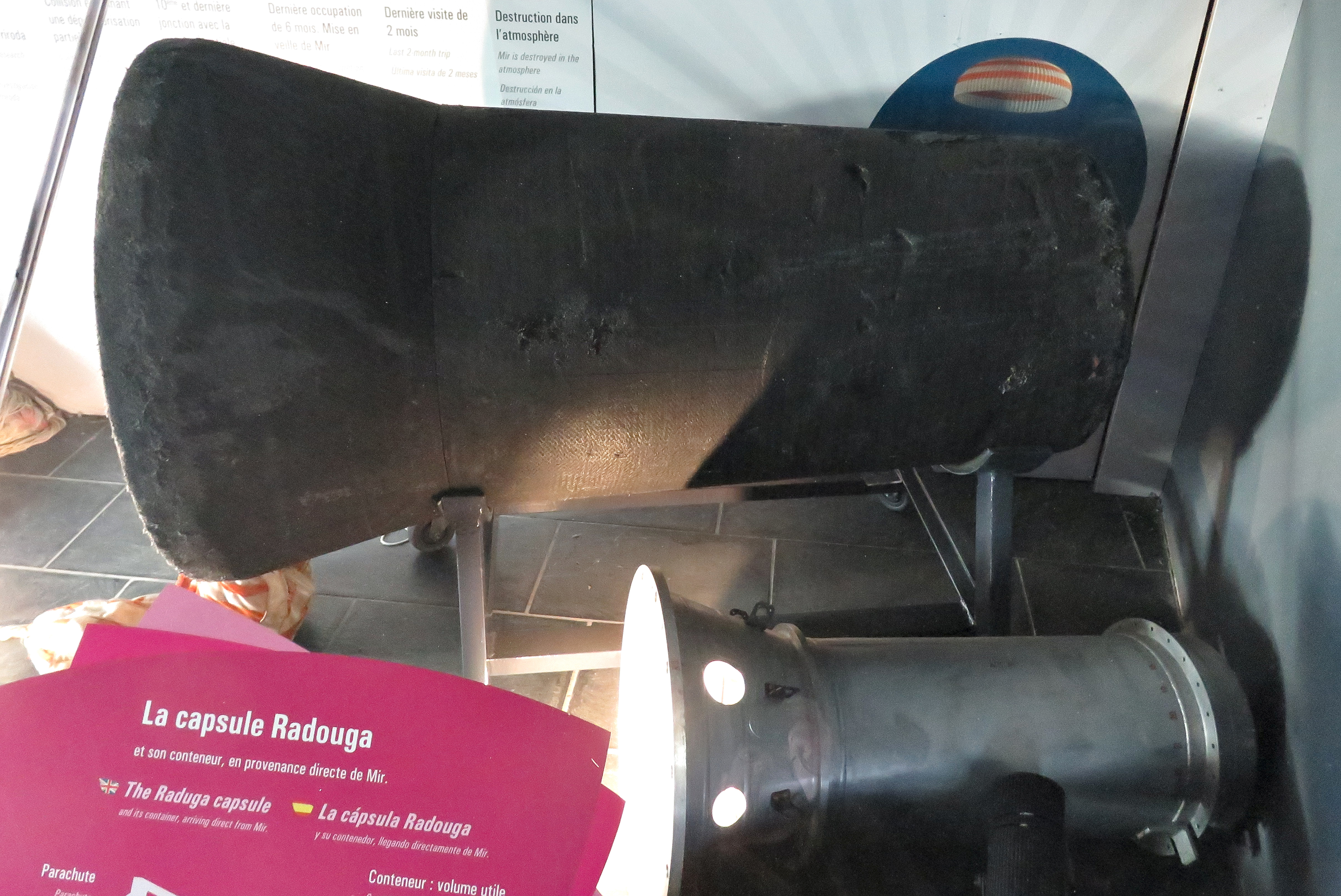
Raduga capsule on display at Cité de l'Espace in Toulouse, France

Capsule	Launch date	Carried by	Notes
VBK-Raduga 1	27 September 1990	Progress M-5	
VBK-Raduga 2	19 March 1991	Progress M-7	Lost on reentry
VBK-Raduga 3	20 August 1991	Progress M-9	
VBK-Raduga 4	17 October 1991	Progress M-10	
VBK-Raduga 5	19 April 1992	Progress M-12	
VBK-Raduga 6	15 August 1992	Progress M-14	
VBK-Raduga 7	31 March 1993	Progress M-17	Capsule returned by Progress M-18
VBK-Raduga 8	10 August 1993	Progress M-19	
VBK-Raduga 9	11 October 1993	Progress M-20	
VBK-Raduga 10	22 March 1994	Progress M-23	
	9 April 1995	Progress M-27	

== See also ==
- HTV Small Re-entry Capsule
