= Progress M-20 =

Russian spacecraft

- A Progress-M spacecraft
- Mission type: Mir resupply
- COSPAR ID: 1993-064A
- SATCAT no.: 22867

Spacecraft properties
- Spacecraft: Progress (No.220)
- Spacecraft type: Progress-M
- Manufacturer: RKK Energia

Start of mission
- Launch date: 11 October 1993, 21:33:19 UTC
- Rocket: Soyuz-U
- Launch site: Baikonur, Site 1/5

End of mission
- Disposal: Deorbited
- Decay date: 21 November 1993, 08:51 UTC

Orbital parameters
- Reference system: Geocentric
- Regime: Low Earth
- Perigee altitude: 191 km
- Apogee altitude: 242 km
- Inclination: 51.6°
- Period: 88.5 minutes
- Epoch: 11 October 1993

Docking with Mir
- Docking port: Kvant-1 aft
- Docking date: 13 October 1993, 23:24:46 UTC
- Undocking date: 21 November 1993, 02:38:43 UTC

Progress M-20 (Russian: Прогресс M-20) was a Russian unmanned Progress cargo spacecraft, which was launched in 1993 to resupply the Mir space station.

== Launch ==
Progress M-20 launched on 11 October 1993 from the Baikonur Cosmodrome in Kazakhstan. It used a Soyuz-U rocket.

== Docking ==
Progress M-20 docked with the aft port of the Kvant-1 module of Mir on 13 October 1993 at 23:24:46 UTC, and was undocked on 21 November 1993 at 02:38:43 UTC.

== Decay ==
It remained in orbit until 21 November 1993, when it was deorbited. The VBK-Raduga 10 capsule was jettisoned at 08:50 UTC, immediately before reentry. The mission ending occurred at 09:03 UTC, when the VBK-Raduga capsule landed across the Kazakh border from the Russian city of Orsk.

== See also ==
- 1993 in spaceflight
- List of Progress missions
- List of uncrewed spaceflights to Mir
