= Progress M-16 =

Russian uncrewed cargo spacecraft

- Mission type: Mir resupply
- COSPAR ID: 1993-012A
- SATCAT no.: 22530

Spacecraft properties
- Spacecraft type: Progress-M 11F615A55
- Manufacturer: NPO Energia
- Launch mass: 7,250 kilograms (15,980 lb)

Start of mission
- Launch date: 21 February 1993, 18:32:32 UTC
- Rocket: Soyuz-U2
- Launch site: Baikonur Site 1/5

End of mission
- Disposal: Deorbited
- Decay date: 27 March 1993

Orbital parameters
- Reference system: Geocentric
- Regime: Low Earth
- Perigee altitude: 387 kilometres (240 mi)
- Apogee altitude: 390 kilometres (240 mi)
- Inclination: 51.6 degrees

Docking with Mir
- Docking port: Kvant-1 Aft
- Docking date: 23 February 1993, 20:17:57 UTC
- Undocking date: 26 March 1993, 06:50:00 UTC
- Time docked: 30 days

Docking with Mir
- Docking port: Kvant-1 Aft
- Docking date: 26 March 1993, 07:06:03 UTC
- Undocking date: 27 March 1993, 04:21:00 UTC
- Time docked: 1 day

Progress M-16 (Russian: Прогресс М-16) was a Russian uncrewed cargo spacecraft which was launched in 1993 to resupply the Mir space station. The thirty-fourth of sixty-four Progress spacecraft to visit Mir, it used the Progress-M 11F615A55 configuration, and had the serial number 216. It carried supplies including food, water and oxygen for the EO-13 crew aboard Mir, as well as equipment for conducting scientific research, and fuel for adjusting the station's orbit and performing manoeuvres.

Progress M-16 was launched at 18:32:32 GMT on 21 February 1993, atop a Soyuz-U2 carrier rocket flying from Site 1/5 at the Baikonur Cosmodrome. Following two days of free flight, it docked with the aft port of the Kvant-1 module at 20:17:57 GMT on 23 February.

Progress M-16 remained docked with Mir for 30 days, during which time it was in an orbit of around 387 by 390 kilometres (209 by 211 nmi), inclined at 51.6 degrees. It undocked from Mir at 06:50:00 GMT on 26 March, before redocking with the same port at 07:06:03 to test its docking systems. It undocked for the final time at 04:21:00 GMT on 27 March, and was deorbited few hours later at 10:25:00, to a destructive reentry over the Pacific Ocean.

== See also ==
- 1993 in spaceflight
- List of Progress flights
- List of uncrewed spaceflights to Mir
