= Spatial Geodesy Research Group =

The Spatial Geodesy Research Group(French: Groupe de Recherche de Géodésie Spatiale, GRGS) is a French group established to advance space geodesy. It is composed of ten public bodies (CNES, IGN, INSU, SHOM, Bureau des longitudes, Observatoire de Paris, Observatoire Midi-Pyrénées, Observatoire de la Côte d'Azur, Université de la Polynésie française, ESGT du CNAM) providing their researchers, engineers, technicians, administrative staff (more than 100 people) and the appropriate research environment..

The GRGS, spread over the whole of France (Grasse, Toulouse, Paris, Brest, Tahiti, Le Mans), is structured as a real laboratory, with a Steering Committee, a Scientific Directorate and its Scientific Council, an Office, a supported Evaluation Committee on the sections of the CNRS, and an Executive Director. The GRGS has organized summer schools every two years in the premises of the ENSG in Forcalquier, and each year various scientific days, in order to facilitate the progression of knowledge in the community.

== Funding ==
In view of the subjects dealt with, the financing of equipment and operations is, in addition to the own funds of the laboratories involved, mainly provided by CNES. These funds are managed by the Institut national des sciences de l'Univers (INSU), whose core business is effectively the financing of research in astronomy and geophysics on behalf of the State. When it was created, CNES was given the task of supporting research in space fields, and as such the GRGS is one of the 5 French space laboratories. One of the aspects that sometimes makes the system complex for an external observer is that the CNES, like the other partners, also provides the GRGS with research staff: it thus appears both as one of the constituent laboratories and as the financial partner of all the research carried out by all, even if it is not the same branches of CNES which are involved in these two cases.

This "outsourcing" within a larger whole that is the GRGS generally corresponds for each organization to a concern for the quality of the work of its researchers, as it is difficult in such specialized fields to engage in research activities. evaluation without being both judge and party.

== Research fields ==
The activities pooled within the GRGS are therefore research activities in spatial geodesy, but they are also observatory activities, which typically could not therefore be financed through traditional scientific calls for tenders, and which are consistent with the objectives and statutes of the 10 member organizations. This association thus makes it possible to add up their strengths quite widely.

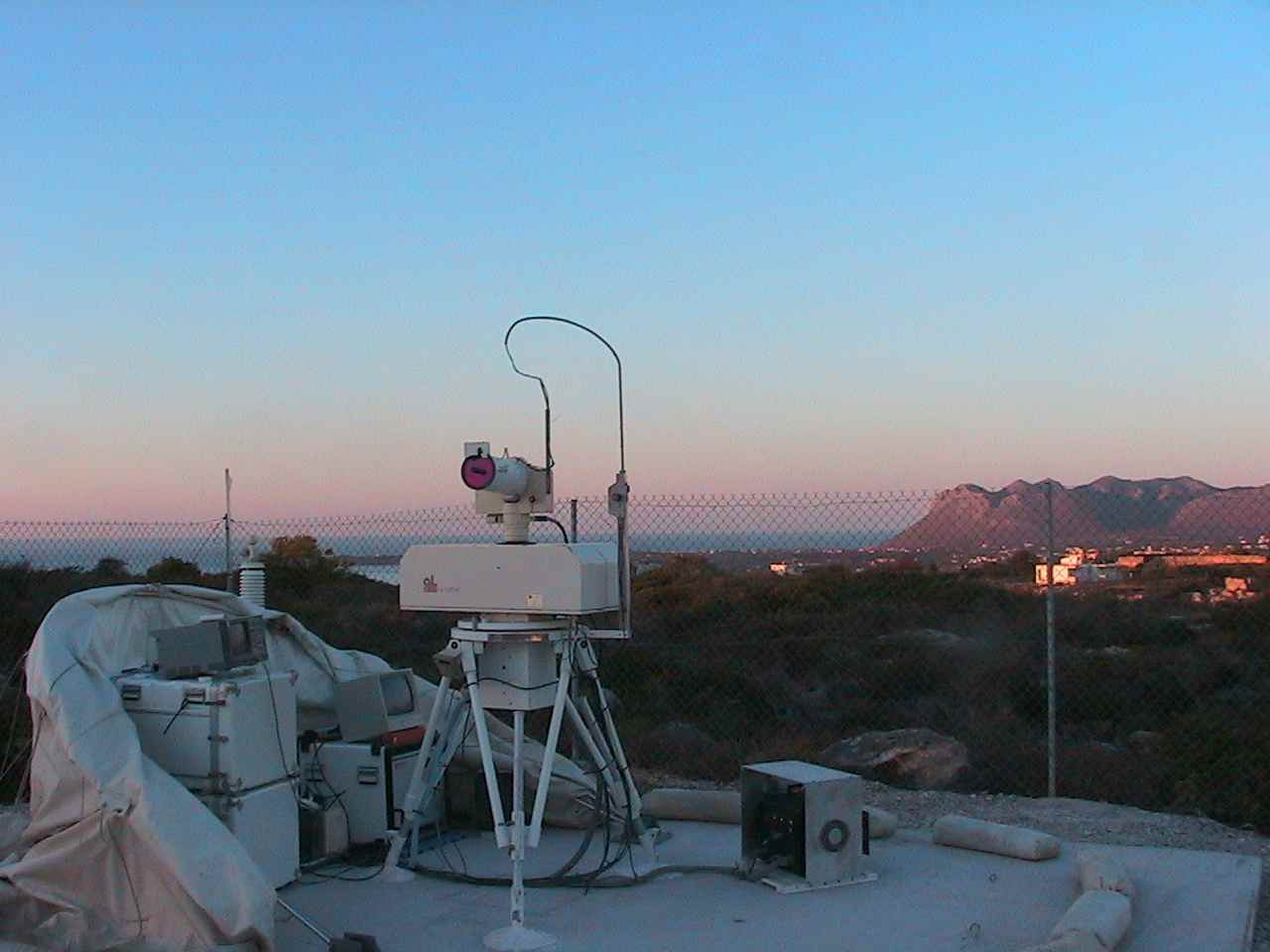
French Transportable Laser Ranging Station (FTLRS) at Ajaccio (2003)

This grouping has obtained first-rate results to its credit in scientific terms: for example the GRIM global gravity field models, the most accurate currently available, the ITRS and ITRF global geodetic references on which virtually all geodetic systems are built. national and continental markets of the world, the development of numerous tools:

- laser telemetry stations on artificial satellites or on the Moon,
- scientific software: GINS, CATREF, ...
- satellites and more or less complete participations in major space tools: Stella, Starlet, Topex-Poseidon, Jason 1 and 2, Doris, Champ, Goce, Grace, ...

== See also ==
=== Related articles ===
- geodesy
- International Celestial Reference System
- geodesic system
- geomantics
