= AEROS MH-1 =

2024 Portuguese satellite

- Operator: AEROS Consortium
- COSPAR ID: 2024-043AZ
- SATCAT no.: 59145
- Mission duration: 1 year

Spacecraft properties
- Spacecraft type: 3U CubeSat
- Payload mass: 4.5 kg (9.9 lb)
- Dimensions: 10 cm x 10 cm x 30 cm (3U)

Start of mission
- Launch date: 4 March 2024, 22:05 (UTC)
- Rocket: Falcon 9
- Launch site: Vandenberg Space Force Base
- Contractor: SpaceX

Orbital parameters
- Reference system: Geocentric orbit
- Regime: Low Earth orbit
- Period: 90 minutes

The AEROS MH-1 is a Portuguese nanosatellite that orbited Earth at an altitude of around 510 km. Launched on 4 March 2024 from the Vandenberg Space Force Base in California, it was Portugal's second ever satellite, after the PoSAT-1. Its purpose is ocean mapping and observation, with particular interest in the Portuguese exclusive economic zone in the Atlantic Ocean.

== Background and function ==
The AEROS MH-1 was launched to map and observe the oceans of planet Earth, with particular interest in the Atlantic Ocean, since the Portuguese Exclusive Economic Zone is located there. It was Portugal's second ever satellite, second only to 1993's PoSAT-1, and its meant to be the first step towards making Portugal “a space nation by the end of the 2020s”.

Work on the satellite began in 2020 and it represents an investment of 2.78 million euros, co-financed by 1.88 million euros from the European Regional Development Fund (ERDF). Its name is a homage to Manuel Heitor, former Portuguese Minister of Science, Technology and Higher Education.

== Launch ==
The AEROS MH-1 was launched on 4 March 2024, 14:05 PTZ, from the Vandenberg Space Force Base in California, aboard Space X's Falcon 9, as part of the Transporter 10 mission. It was first Portuguese satellite to be launched into space in over thirty years.

== Aftermath ==
The satellite orbited at an altitude of around 510 km, slightly above the International Space Station. Communications and data collection were carried out from the island of Santa Maria in the Azores. It re-entered the atmosphere after completing its life cycle, following more than a year in orbit, on April 15, 2025.

== See also ==
- Portuguese Space Agency
- PoSAT-1
