= Gorizont =

Russian/Soviet satellites series, launched 1978–2000

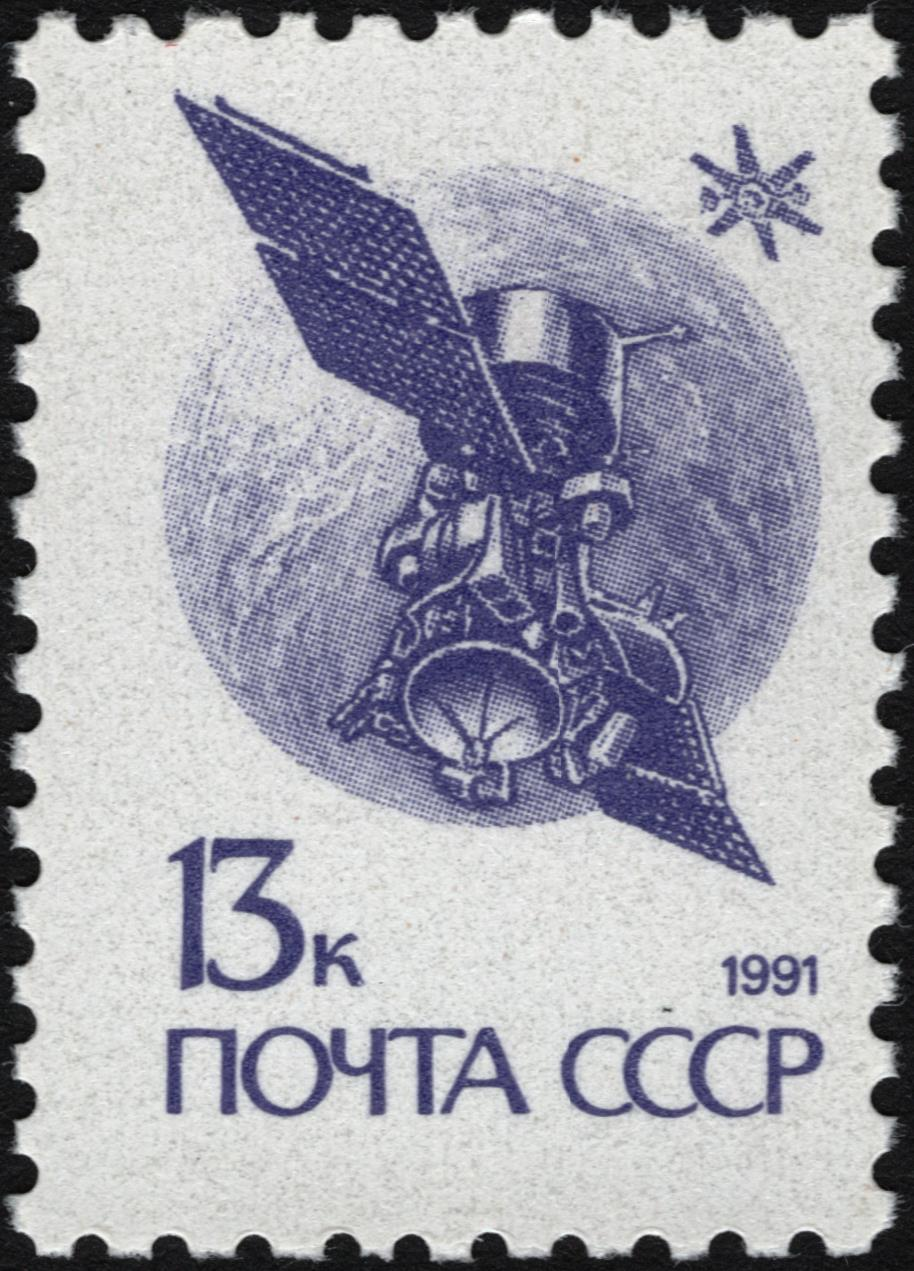
- Gorizont on a 1991 Soviet stamp
- Names: Горизонт; Horizon; 11F662
- Mission type: Communications
- Operator: Russian Satellite Communications Company (RSCC)
- Mission duration: 3 years (planned)

Spacecraft properties
- Spacecraft: Gorizont
- Bus: KAUR-3
- Manufacturer: NPO PM (ISS Reshetnev)
- Launch mass: 2,110 kg (4,650 lb)

Start of mission
- Launch date: 1978 - 2000
- Rocket: Proton
- Launch site: Baikonur
- Contractor: Khrunichev

Orbital parameters
- Reference system: Geocentric orbit
- Regime: Geostationary orbit

Transponders
- Coverage area: Soviet Union, Russia

Gorizont (Russian: Горизонт, lit. 'horizon'), GRAU index 11F662, was a series of 35 Russian, previously Soviet, geosynchronous communications satellites launched between 1978 and 2000. The program was started in order to develop a satellite system to relay coverage of the 1980 Olympic Games from Moscow. The first four satellites were originally launched for this sole purpose. Following this, the Gorizont system was integrated into the YeSSS Unified Satellite Communication System, and was used to relay both civilian and military communications. From 1988 onwards, the satellites were also used in support of the Okean program.

Gorizont satellites were based on the KAUR-3 satellite bus, which provided three-axis stabilisation, and liquid maneuvering engines. The Gorizont satellite constellation was replaced by the Ekspress constellation. The first satellite Gorizont-11L was launched on 19 December 1978 and the last satellite launched was Gorizont No.45L on 6 June 2000.

== Broadcast ==
Following the 1980 Olympics, some of the surplus C-Band capacity on the satellites was used to distribute Television in the Soviet Union both to relay transmitters within the USSR (where the vast physical size of the country made conventional distribution to remote areas difficult) and to other Eastern Bloc and allied countries for relay to Soviet troops stationed there. Later programming from other Warsaw Pact countries and Cuba were added. Signals from these satellites spread well outside their intended area and were for a time very popular with early domestic satellite television enthusiasts in Western Europe as these were among the first such signals to be receivable there. In this application, Gorizont was (except at high latitudes) the successor to the Orbita system which used non-geostationary Molniya satellites. Gorizont represented an improvement in channel capacity and could be picked up on less elaborate receiving systems.
