= RACE (Europe) =

European research program

RACE program (Research and Development in Advanced Communications Technologies in Europe) was a program launched in 1983 in Brussels, Belgium by the Commission of the European Communities to pave the way towards commercial use of Integrated Broadband Communication (IBC) in Europe in late 1990s.
