= Gorizont 33 =

Russian communications satellite

- Names: Горизонт 33; Horizon 33; Gorizont 45L
- Mission type: Communications
- Operator: Kosmicheskiya Svyaz (RSCC)
- COSPAR ID: 2000-029A
- SATCAT no.: 26373
- Website: https://eng.rscc.ru/
- Mission duration: 3 years (planned); 8 years (achieved)

Spacecraft properties
- Spacecraft: Gorizont 33
- Spacecraft type: KAUR
- Bus: KAUR-3
- Manufacturer: NPO PM
- Launch mass: 2,300 kg (5,100 lb)
- Dimensions: 2 m (diameter); 5 m (height)
- Power: 1280 watts

Start of mission
- Launch date: 6 June 2000, 02:59:00 UTC
- Rocket: Proton-K / Briz-M
- Launch site: Baikonur, Site 81/24
- Contractor: Khrunichev State Research and Production Space Center
- Entered service: August 2000

End of mission
- Disposal: Graveyard orbit
- Deactivated: March 2008

Orbital parameters
- Reference system: Geocentric orbit
- Regime: Geostationary orbit
- Longitude: 145° East

Transponders
- Band: 7 transponders: 6 C-band; 1 Ku-band
- Coverage area: Russia, Commonwealth of Independent States

Gorizont 33 (Russian: Горизонт 33 meaning "Horizon 33"), also known as Gorizont 45L, was a Russian communications satellite operated by Kosmicheskiya Svyaz (RSCC). It was the last satellite to be launched as part of the Gorizont constellation. Constructed by NPO Prikladnoi Mekhaniki (NPO PM), it was based on the KAUR-3 satellite bus. Its launch was contracted by Khrunichev State Research and Production Space Center, using a Proton-K / Briz-M launch vehicle.

== Launch ==
The launch occurred at 02:59:00 UTC on 6 June 2000 from Site 81/24 at the Baikonur Cosmodrome. This was the first successful launch of a Proton with a Briz-M upper stage, and as the previous Proton/Briz-M launch failed during the second stage burn, on 5 July 1999, the first firing of a Briz-M in flight. The Proton itself flew with uprated engines, increasing its payload capacity ahead of the launch of Zvezda, a little over a month later, on 12 July 2000. The launch was conducted as a test flight of the Proton, and the satellite would not have been considered a significant loss if it had not reached orbit.

== Mission ==
Following its launch and on-orbit testing, it was placed in geosynchronous orbit at 145° East, from where it provides communications services to Russia. It carried seven transponders, and had an expected on-orbit lifespan of three years. Its stabilisation system failed in March 2008, leaving the satellite drifting at a rate of 0.3° West per day, eight years after it had been launched.
