= USA-91 =

American navigation satellite used for GPS

- Names: Navstar 2A-11; GPS IIA-11; GPS II-20; GPS SVN-37
- Mission type: Navigation
- Operator: U.S. Air Force
- COSPAR ID: 1993-032A
- SATCAT no.: 22657
- Mission duration: 7.5 years (planned); 14.5 years (achieved)

Spacecraft properties
- Spacecraft: GPS IIA
- Spacecraft type: GPS Block IIA
- Manufacturer: Rockwell International
- Launch mass: 840 kg (1,850 lb)
- Dimensions: 5.3 m (17 ft) of long
- Power: 710 watts

Start of mission
- Launch date: 13 May 1993, 00:07:00 UTC
- Rocket: Delta II 7925-9.5 (Delta D220)
- Launch site: Cape Canaveral, LC-17A
- Contractor: McDonnell Douglas
- Entered service: 14 June 1993

End of mission
- Disposal: Graveyard orbit
- Deactivated: 18 March 2016
- Last contact: 20 December 2007

Orbital parameters
- Reference system: Geocentric orbit
- Regime: Medium Earth orbit (Semi-synchronous)
- Slot: C4 (slot 4 plane C)
- Perigee altitude: 20,033 km (12,448 mi)
- Apogee altitude: 20,334 km (12,635 mi)
- Inclination: 54.9°
- Period: 717.88 minutes

USA-91, also known as GPS IIA-11, GPS II-20 and GPS SVN-37, was an American navigation satellite which formed part of the Global Positioning System. It was the eleventh of nineteen Block IIA GPS satellites to be launched.

== Background ==
Global Positioning System (GPS) was developed by the U.S. Department of Defense to provide all-weather round-the-clock navigation capabilities for military ground, sea, and air forces. Since its introduction, GPS has also developed into a valuable tool for a wide range of civilian uses and sectors, including surveying, tracking corporate vehicle fleets, and outdoor enjoyment (such as sailing, flying, and hiking). GPS employs 24 spacecraft in 20,200 km circular orbits inclined at 55.0°. These vehicles are placed in 6 orbit planes with four operational satellites in each plane.

GPS Block 2 was the operational system, following the demonstration system composed of Block 1 (Navstar 1 - 11) spacecraft. These spacecraft were 3-axis stabilized, nadir pointing using reaction wheels. Dual solar arrays supplied 710 watts of power. They used S-band (SGLS) communications for control and telemetry and Ultra high frequency (UHF) cross-link between spacecraft. The payload consisted of two L-band navigation signals at 1575.42 MHz (L1) and 1227.60 MHz (L2). Each spacecraft carried 2 rubidium and 2 Cesium clocks and nuclear detonation detection sensors. Built by Rockwell Space Systems for the U.S. Air force, the spacecraft measured 5.3 m across with solar panels deployed and had a design life of 7.5 years.

== Launch ==
USA-91 was launched at 00:07:00 UTC on 13 May 1993, atop a Delta II launch vehicle, flight number D220, flying in the 7925–9.5 configuration. The launch took place from Launch Complex 17A (LC-17A) at the Cape Canaveral Air Force Station (CCAFS), and placed USA-91 into a transfer orbit. The satellite raised itself into medium Earth orbit using a Star-37XFP apogee motor.

== Mission ==
On 14 June 1993, USA-91 was in orbit with a perigee of 20,033 km (12,448 mi), an apogee of 20,334 km (12,635 mi), a period of 717.88 minutes, and 54.9° of inclination to the equator. It broadcast signal PRN 07, and operated in slot 4 of plane C of the GPS constellation. The satellite had a mass of 840 kg (1,850 lb). It had a design life of 7.5 years, and ceased operations on 20 December 2007.

Following decommissioning, it was kept as a reserve satellite. It was finally put in a disposal orbit approximately 1000 km above the operational constellation on 18 March 2016.
