= PoSAT-1 =

Portuguese satellite

- Operator: Po-SAT consortium
- COSPAR ID: 1993-061G
- SATCAT no.: 22826

Spacecraft properties
- Spacecraft type: Microsat
- Manufacturer: SSTL
- Launch mass: 12 Kg
- Dimensions: 58 x 35 x 35 cm

Start of mission
- Launch date: 26 September 1993, 01:45 UTC
- Rocket: Ariane-4 V59
- Launch site: Kourou ELA-2
- Contractor: Arianespace

End of mission
- Declared: 2006

Orbital parameters
- Reference system: Geocentric
- Regime: LEO
- Eccentricity: 0,00153
- Perigee altitude: 800 kilometres (500 mi)
- Apogee altitude: 822 kilometres (511 mi)
- Inclination: 98.6º
- Period: 101 minutes
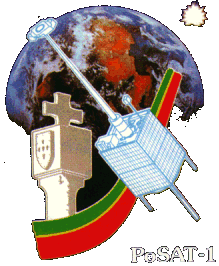

PoSAT-1 (OSAT-OSCAR 28, OSCAR 28, PO 28, 1993-061G), the first Portuguese satellite, was launched into orbit on 26 September 1993, on the 59th flight of the Ariane 4 launch vehicle. The launch took place in the Centre Spatial Guyanais, French Guiana. About 20 minutes and 35 seconds after launch, at an altitude of 807 km, PoSAT-1 separated itself from the launch vehicle.

The PoSAT-1 weighs about 12 kg and belongs to the class of microsatellites, which are between 10 and 100 kg. The entire project was developed by a consortium of universities and companies in Portugal and was built at the University of Surrey, United Kingdom. The total cost was around €5 million, about €3 million paid by the Portuguese Government and €2 million by the Portuguese companies involved (Po-SAT consortium: Instituto Nacional de Engenharia, Tecnologia e Inovação (INETI), EFACEC, ALCATEL, Marconi Company, OGMA, Instituto Superior Técnico (IST), University of Beira Interior (UBI) and CEDINTEC). The responsible for the project was Fernando Carvalho Rodrigues, known as the father of the first Portuguese satellite.

== Mission ==
The mission was called Flight 59, which launched several satellites: PoSAT-1 from Portugal, Eyesat-1 and ItamSat from Italy, KITSAT-2 from South Korea, HealthSat-2 (an international medical satellite) and Stella and SPOT-3 from France, the latter one a large satellite for Earth imaging photography.

== Spacecraft ==
The PoSAT-1 is a box of aluminum, in the form of a parallelepiped, 58 cm long, 35 cm wide, 35 cm depth and weighs 12 kg. Over a first drawer that contains the batteries and the remote detection module are stacked 10 other drawers full of electronic cards. At the top of the satellite there are sensors for attitude and the stabilization mast, essential tools for PoSAT-1 to maintain correct orbit. Four solar panels are mounted on the lateral sides of the structure of the satellite, forming a parallelepiped, which are the source of energy for all on-board systems. Each panel contains 1344 cells of Gallium arsenide (GaAs).

== Numbers ==
- Speed: 7.3 km per second.
- Orbit: 822 x 800 km, inclination of 98.6°, Sun-synchronous orbit, lasts 101 minutes, revolves around the Earth around 14 times per day.

== End of mission ==
PoSAT-1 stopped transmitting information to Earth in 2006. Its re-entry is expected to be happen in 2043.

== See also ==
- AEROS MH-1, second Portuguese satellite, launched in 2024
