= HealthNet =

Medical satellite communication service

HealthNet was a satellite communication service that provided healthcare workers in developing nations with access to current medical literature. It also allowed them to exchange information with each other and with colleagues in developed nations. It was operated by American nonprofit SatelLife.

== Creation ==
The idea of SatelLife began in 1985 as a project to include healthcare organizations from the Southern Hemisphere in global health discussions. It was proposed by International Physicians for the Prevention of Nuclear War. The organization was founded in 1989, chaired by Bernard Lown.

== Services ==
The HealthNet constellation provided email services, access to news, electronic conferences, and offline access to websites using a store-and-forward message scheme. The news included selected abstracts and summaries of major medical journals. It also included several newsletters published by HealthNet. Electronic conferences were for discussing medical topics electronically, including ProMED-mail.

== Constellation ==
=== Healthsat-1 ===
Healthsat-1 was launched in 1990 as UoSAT-3 (named for the University of Surrey, one of the mission sponsors). It was later transferred to SatelLife and renamed Healthsat-1.

=== Healthsat-2 ===
Healthsat 2
- Mission type: Communication
- Operator: SatelLife, Wavix
- COSPAR ID: 1993-061E
- SATCAT no.: 22827

Spacecraft properties
- Spacecraft type: Microsat-70
- Manufacturer: SSTL

Start of mission
- Launch date: 26 September 1993, 01:45 UTC
- Rocket: Ariane-40 V59
- Launch site: Kourou ELA-2
- Contractor: Arianespace

Orbital parameters
- Reference system: Geocentric
- Regime: LEO
- Perigee altitude: 797 kilometres (495 mi)
- Apogee altitude: 821 kilometres (510 mi)
- Inclination: 98.6º
- Period: 100.8 minutes

Healthsat-2 (later WavSat-1) was purpose-built for the HealthNet constellation by Surrey Satellite Technology. In 1993, it provided communications to CCGS Louis S. St-Laurent while it was in the Northwest Passage, reported as the first use of Low Earth Orbit communications near the North Pole. In 1998, SatelLife announced an agreement to share unused capacity from Healthsat-2 with Volunteers In Technical Assistance (VITA), who would operate Healthsat-2 as VITASat 1R. Operations were transferred to satellite communications company Wavix, which continued operating the satellite as WavSat-1.
