= List of Oko satellites =

Oko is a Russian (previously Soviet) satellite-based missile detection and early warning system. The system has used a total of 101 satellites, which were launched between 1972 and 2012. Eighty six US-K satellites, operated in semisynchronous elliptical molniya orbits, were launched by Molniya-M carrier rockets with Blok 2BL upper stages, whilst the geostationary part of the system was served by seven US-KS and eight US-KMO satellites, launched using Proton-K carrier rockets with Blok DM and DM-2 upper stages.

Spacecraft	Type	Launch Date (UTC)	Carrier rocket	Launch site	Placement	Ceased operations	Decay Date	Remarks
Kosmos 520	US-K	19 September 1972; 19:19:03	Molniya-M/2BL	Plesetsk 41/1	HEO 4	Unknown	in orbit	
Kosmos 606	US-K	2 November 1973; 13:01:56	Molniya-M/2BL	Plesetsk 41/1	HEO 4	April 1974	in orbit	
Kosmos 665	US-K	29 June 1974; 15:59:58	Molniya-M/2BL	Plesetsk 41/1	HEO 2	September 1975	6 July 1990	
Kosmos 706	US-K	30 January 1975; 15:02	Molniya-M/2BL	Plesetsk 41/1	HEO 7	November 1975	in orbit	
Kosmos 775	US-KS	8 October 1975; 00:30:00	Proton-K/DM	Baikonur 81/23	GEO	October 1975	in orbit	Never entered service
Kosmos 862	US-K	22 October 1976; 09:12	Molniya-M/2BL	Plesetsk 43/4	HEO 5	March 1977	in orbit	
Kosmos 903	US-K	11 April 1977; 01:38	Molniya-M/2BL	Plesetsk 43/3	HEO 7	June 1978	in orbit	
Kosmos 917	US-K	16 June 1977; 01:58	Molniya-M/2BL	Plesetsk 43/4	HEO 9	March 1979	in orbit	
Kosmos 931	US-K	20 July 1977; 04:44	Molniya-M/2BL	Plesetsk 43/4	HEO 2	October 1977	in orbit	Never entered service
Kosmos 1024	US-K	28 June 1978; 02:59	Molniya-M/2BL	Plesetsk 43/3	HEO 2	May 1980	in orbit	
Kosmos 1030	US-K	6 September 1978; 03:04	Molniya-M/2BL	Plesetsk 43/4	HEO 4	October 1978	17 August 2004	Never entered service
Kosmos 1109	US-K	27 June 1979; 18:11	Molniya-M/2BL	Plesetsk 41/1	HEO 9	February 1980	in orbit	Never entered service
Kosmos 1124	US-K	28 August 1979; 00:17	Molniya-M/2BL	Plesetsk 43/4	HEO 4	September 1979	in orbit	Never entered service
Kosmos 1164	US-K	12 February 1980; 00:53	Molniya-M/2BL	Plesetsk 43/4	HEO 9	12 February 1980	12 February 1980	Launch failure; Blok 2BL failed to ignite, never left low Earth parking orbit
Kosmos 1172	US-K	12 April 1980; 20:18	Molniya-M/2BL	Plesetsk 41/1	HEO 9	April 1982	26 December 1997	
Kosmos 1188	US-K	14 June 1980; 20:52	Molniya-M/2BL	Plesetsk 43/3	HEO 2	October 1980	in orbit	
Kosmos 1191	US-K	2 July 1980; 00:54	Molniya-M/2BL	Plesetsk 41/1	HEO 4	May 1981	in orbit	
Kosmos 1217	US-K	24 October 1980; 10:53	Molniya-M/2BL	Plesetsk 41/1	HEO 2	March 1983	in orbit	
Kosmos 1223	US-K	27 November 1980; 21:37	Molniya-M/2BL	Plesetsk 41/1	HEO 7	August 1982	in orbit	
Kosmos 1247	US-K	19 February 1981; 10:00	Molniya-M/2BL	Plesetsk 16/2	HEO 5	October 1981	in orbit	
Kosmos 1261	US-K	31 March 1981; 09:40	Molniya-M/2BL	Plesetsk 41/1	HEO 6	May 1981	in orbit	
Kosmos 1278	US-K	19 June 1981; 19:37:04	Molniya-M/2BL	Plesetsk 43/3	HEO 4	July 1984	2 September 2000	
Kosmos 1285	US-K	4 August 1981; 00:13	Molniya-M/2BL	Plesetsk 16/2	HEO 6	November 1981	in orbit	Never entered service
Kosmos 1317	US-K	31 October 1981; 22:54	Molniya-M/2BL	Plesetsk 16/2	HEO 9	January 1984	in orbit	
Kosmos 1341	US-K	3 March 1982; 05:44:38	Molniya-M/2BL	Plesetsk 16/2	HEO 5	February 1984	in orbit	
Kosmos 1348	US-K	7 April 1982; 13:42	Molniya-M/2BL	Plesetsk 16/2	HEO 9	July 1984	in orbit	
Kosmos 1367	US-K	20 May 1982; 13:09	Molniya-M/2BL	Plesetsk 41/1	HEO 1	September 1984	in orbit	
Kosmos 1382	US-K	25 June 1982; 02:28	Molniya-M/2BL	Plesetsk 43/3	HEO 7	September 1984	in orbit	
Kosmos 1409	US-K	22 September 1982; 06:23	Molniya-M/2BL	Plesetsk 16/2	HEO 2	January 1987	8 June 2009	
Kosmos 1456	US-K	25 April 1983; 19:34	Molniya-M/2BL	Plesetsk 16/2	HEO 4	August 1983	11 May 1998	
Kosmos 1481	US-K	8 July 1983; 19:21	Molniya-M/2BL	Plesetsk 43/3	HEO 6	9 July 1983	in orbit	Never entered service
Kosmos 1518	US-K	28 December 1983; 03:48	Molniya-M/2BL	Plesetsk 16/2	HEO 5	June 1984	19 September 1998	
Kosmos 1541	US-K	6 March 1984; 17:10	Molniya-M/2BL	Plesetsk 16/2	HEO 3	October 1985	in orbit	
Kosmos 1546	US-KS	29 March 1984; 05:53	Proton-K/DM	Baikonur 200/40	GEO 1 & 4	November 1986	in orbit	
Kosmos 1547	US-K	4 April 1984; 01:40:04	Molniya-M/2BL	Plesetsk 16/2	HEO 7	August 1985	in orbit	
Kosmos 1569	US-K	6 June 1984; 15:34	Molniya-M/2BL	Plesetsk 16/2	HEO 5	January 1986	7 May 2001	
Kosmos 1581	US-K	3 July 1984; 21:31	Molniya-M/2BL	Plesetsk 43/4	HEO 8	August 1985	in orbit	
Kosmos 1586	US-K	2 August 1984; 08:38	Molniya-M/2BL	Plesetsk 16/2	HEO 4	April 1985	in orbit	
Kosmos 1596	US-K	7 September 1984; 19:13	Molniya-M/2BL	Plesetsk 16/2	HEO 9	November 1986	in orbit	
Kosmos 1604	US-K	4 October 1984	Molniya-M/2BL	Plesetsk 16/2	HEO 1	September 1985	in orbit	
Kosmos 1629	US-KS	21 February 1985; 07:57	Proton-K/DM	Baikonur 200/39	GEO 4, 3 & 1	January 1987	in orbit	
Kosmos 1658	US-K	11 June 1985; 14:27	Molniya-M/2BL	Plesetsk 41/1	HEO 6	September 1987	12 November 2005	
Kosmos 1661	US-K	18 June 1985; 00:40:26	Molniya-M/2BL	Plesetsk 16/2	HEO	October 1989	in orbit	Never entered service
Kosmos 1675	US-K	12 August 1985; 15:09	Molniya-M/2BL	Plesetsk 16/2	HEO 8	January 1986	in orbit	
Kosmos 1684	US-K	24 September 1985; 01:18:10	Molniya-M/2BL	Plesetsk 43/4	HEO 4	March 1989	in orbit	
Kosmos 1687	US-K	30 September 1985; 19:23	Molniya-M/2BL	Plesetsk 16/2	HEO 2	September 1985	in orbit	
Kosmos 1698	US-K	22 October 1985; 20:24	Molniya-M/2BL	Plesetsk 43/4	HEO 3	August 1986	in orbit	
Kosmos 1701	US-K	9 November 1985; 08:25	Molniya-M/2BL	Plesetsk 41/1	HEO 8	November 1987	11 May 2001	
Kosmos 1729	US-K	1 February 1986; 18:11:56	Molniya-M/2BL	Plesetsk 16/2	HEO 5	May 1988	in orbit	
Kosmos 1761	US-K	5 July 1986; 01:16:47	Molniya-M/2BL	Plesetsk 43/4	HEO 3	October 1988	in orbit	
Kosmos 1774	US-K	28 August 1986; 08:02:43	Molniya-M/2BL	Plesetsk 16/2	HEO 7	July 1988	2 November 2010	
Kosmos 1783	US-K	3 October 1986; 13:05:40	Molniya-M/2BL	Plesetsk 41/1	HEO 1	3 October 1986	in orbit	Launch failure during upper stage burn, placed in lower than planned orbit and unusable
Kosmos 1785	US-K	15 October 1986; 09:29:18	Molniya-M/2BL	Plesetsk 41/1	HEO 9	January 1991	28 February 2002	
Kosmos 1793	US-K	20 November 1986; 12:09:20	Molniya-M/2BL	Plesetsk 16/2	HEO 2	August 1991	15 May 2011	
Kosmos 1806	US-K	12 December 1986; 18:35:36	Molniya-M/2BL	Plesetsk 43/4	HEO 5	November 1988	in orbit	
Kosmos 1849	US-K	4 June 1987; 18:50:23	Molniya-M/2BL	Plesetsk 16/2	HEO 1	May 1990	3 February 2003	
Kosmos 1851	US-K	12 June 1987; 07:40:28	Molniya-M/2BL	Plesetsk 43/4	HEO 6	November 1989	in orbit	
Kosmos 1894	US-KS	28 October 1987; 15:15:00	Proton-K/DM-2	Baikonur 200/40	GEO 1	December 1991	in orbit	
Kosmos 1903	US-K	21 December 1987; 22:35:42	Molniya-M/2BL	Plesetsk 41/1	HEO 8	November 1992	in orbit	
Kosmos 1922	US-K	26 February 1988; 09:39:12	Molniya-M/2BL	Plesetsk 41/1	HEO 5	July 1990	in orbit	
Kosmos 1966	US-K	30 August 1988; 14:14:54	Molniya-M/2BL	Plesetsk 16/2	HEO 3	December 1990	10 November 2005	
Kosmos 1974	US-K	3 October 1988; 22:23:39	Molniya-M/2BL	Plesetsk 41/1	HEO 7	May 1993	in orbit	
Kosmos 1977	US-K	25 October 1988; 18:02:31	Molniya-M/2BL	Plesetsk 41/1	HEO 6	July 1990	in orbit	
Kosmos 2001	US-K	14 February 1989; 04:21:11	Molniya-M/2BL	Plesetsk 43/3	HEO 4	March 1993	22 September 2008	
Kosmos 2050	US-K	23 November 1989; 20:35:44	Molniya-M/2BL	Plesetsk 16/2	HEO 9	October 1993	in orbit	
Kosmos 2063	US-K	27 March 1990; 16:40:08	Molniya-M/2BL	Plesetsk 43/3	HEO 2	June 1995	in orbit	
Kosmos 2076	US-K	28 April 1990; 11:37:02	Molniya-M/2BL	Plesetsk 16/2	HEO 1	October 1992	in orbit	
Kosmos 2084	US-K	21 June 1990; 20:45:52	Molniya-M/2BL	Plesetsk 43/3	HEO 6	21 June 1990	in orbit	Launch failure; Blok 2BL failed to ignite, never left low Earth orbit
Kosmos 2087	US-K	25 July 1990; 18:13:56	Molniya-M/2BL	Plesetsk 16/2	HEO 6	January 1992	in orbit	
Kosmos 2097	US-K	28 August 1990; 07:49:13	Molniya-M/2BL	Plesetsk 43/4	HEO 3	April 1995	in orbit	
Kosmos 2105	US-K	20 November 1990; 02:33:14	Molniya-M/2BL	Plesetsk 16/2	HEO 3	April 1993	21 January 2008	
Kosmos 2133	US-KMO	14 February 1991; 08:31:56	Proton-K/DM-2	Baikonur 200/39	GEO 4, 3, 2, 1 & 4	November 1995	in orbit	
Kosmos 2155	US-KS	13 September 1991; 17:51:02	Proton-K/DM-2	Baikonur 81/23	GEO 1	June 1992	in orbit	
Kosmos 2176	US-K	24 January 1992; 01:18:01	Molniya-M/2BL	Plesetsk 43/3	HEO 6	April 1996	17 January 2012	
Kosmos 2196	US-K	8 July 1992; 09:53:14	Molniya-M/2BL	Plesetsk 43/3	HEO 5	June 1994	in orbit	
Kosmos 2209	US-KS	10 September 1992; 18:01:18	Proton-K/DM-2	Baikonur 81/23	GEO 1	November 1996	in orbit	
Kosmos 2217	US-K	21 October 1992; 10:21:22	Molniya-M/2BL	Plesetsk 16/2	HEO 8	November 1996	6 November 2010	
Kosmos 2222	US-K	25 November 1992; 12:18:54	Molniya-M/2BL	Plesetsk 43/3	HEO 1	December 1996	3 May 2023	
Kosmos 2224	US-KMO	17 December 1992; 12:45:00	Proton-K/DM-2	Baikonur 200/39	GEO 2, 1 & 2	June 1999	in orbit	
Kosmos 2232	US-K	26 January 1993; 15:55:26	Molniya-M/2BL	Plesetsk 16/2	HEO 4	June 1998	in orbit	
Kosmos 2241	US-K	6 April 1993; 19:07:27	Molniya-M/2BL	Plesetsk 43/4	HEO 7	January 1997	in orbit	
Kosmos 2261	US-K	10 August 1993; 14:53:45	Molniya-M/2BL	Plesetsk 16/2	HEO 1	March 1998	in orbit	
Kosmos 2282	US-KMO	6 July 1994; 23:58:51	Proton-K/DM-2	Baikonur 81/23	HEO 9	December 1995	in orbit	
Kosmos 2286	US-K	5 August 1994; 01:12:21	Molniya-M/2BL	Plesetsk 16/2	HEO 5	March 1998	in orbit	
Kosmos 2312	US-K	24 May 1995; 20:10:09	Molniya-M/2BL	Plesetsk 16/2	HEO 2	December 1997	in orbit	
Kosmos 2340	US-K	9 April 1997; 08:58:44	Molniya-M/2BL	Plesetsk 16/2	HEO 8	May 2001	in orbit	
Kosmos 2342	US-K	14 May 1997; 00:33:57	Molniya-M/2BL	Plesetsk 43/4	HEO 6	May 2001	in orbit	
Kosmos 2345	US-KS	24 August 1997; 20:49:14	Proton-K/DM-2	Baikonur 200/39	GEO 1	February 1999	in orbit	
Kosmos 2350	US-KMO	29 April 1998; 04:36:54	Proton-K/DM-2	Baikonur 200/39	GEO 4	June 1998	in orbit	
Kosmos 2351	US-K	7 May 1998; 08:53:22	Molniya-M/2BL	Plesetsk 16/2	HEO 1	May 2001	in orbit	
Kosmos 2368	US-K	27 December 1999; 19:12:44	Molniya-M/2BL	Plesetsk 16/2	HEO 3		in orbit	
Kosmos 2379	US-KMO	24 August 2001; 20:35	Proton-K/DM-2	Baikonur 81/24	GEO 4, 1 & 2	2009-10	in orbit	
Kosmos 2388	US-K	1 April 2002; 22:06:45	Molniya-M/2BL	Plesetsk 16/2		November 2006	14 September 2011	
Kosmos 2393	US-K	24 December 2002; 12:20:13	Molniya-M/2BL	Plesetsk 16/2		March 2007	in orbit	
Kosmos 2397	US-KMO	24 April 2003; 04:23:17	Proton-K/DM-2	Baikonur 81/24		June 2003	in orbit	
Kosmos 2422	US-K	21 July 2006; 04:20:03	Molniya-M/2BL	Plesetsk 16/2		Active	in orbit	
Kosmos 2430	US-K	23 October 2007; 04:39	Molniya-M/2BL	Plesetsk 16/2		Active	in orbit	
Kosmos 2440	US-KMO	26 June 2008; 23:59:43	Proton-K/DM-2	Baikonur 81/24	GEO 4	February 2010	in orbit	
Kosmos 2446	US-K	2 December 2008; 05:00	Molniya-M/2BL	Plesetsk 16/2		Active	in orbit	
Kosmos 2469	US-K	30 September 2010; 17:01:15	Molniya-M/2BL	Plesetsk 16/2		Active	in orbit	Final flight of Molniya-M
Kosmos 2479	US-KMO	30 March 2012; 05:49	Proton-K/DM-2	Baikonur 81/24	GEO 4	Active	in orbit	Final flight of Proton-K
