= Kosmos 2286 =

Russian military early warning satellite

- Mission type: Early warning
- COSPAR ID: 1994-048A
- SATCAT no.: 23194
- Mission duration: 4 years

Spacecraft properties
- Spacecraft type: US-K
- Launch mass: 1,900 kilograms (4,200 lb)

Start of mission
- Launch date: 5 August 1994, 01:12 UTC
- Rocket: Molniya-M/2BL
- Launch site: Plesetsk Cosmodrome

Orbital parameters
- Reference system: Geocentric
- Regime: Molniya
- Perigee altitude: 588 kilometres (365 mi)
- Apogee altitude: 39,755 kilometres (24,703 mi)
- Inclination: 62.9 degrees
- Period: 717.56 minutes

Kosmos 2286 (Russian: Космос 2286 meaning Cosmos 2286) is a Russian US-K missile early warning satellite which was launched in 1994 as part of the Russian Space Forces' Oko programme. The satellite is designed to identify missile launches using optical telescopes and infrared sensors.

Kosmos 2286 was launched from Site 16/2 at Plesetsk Cosmodrome in Russia. A Molniya-M carrier rocket with a 2BL upper stage was used to perform the launch, which took place at 01:12 UTC on 5 August 1994. The launch successfully placed the satellite into a molniya orbit. It subsequently received its Kosmos designation, and the international designator 1994-048A. The United States Space Command assigned it the Satellite Catalog Number 23194.

== See also ==
- List of Kosmos satellites (2251–2500)
- List of R-7 launches (1990–1994)
- 1994 in spaceflight
- List of Oko satellites
