= Kosmos 1658 =

Soviet military early warning satellite

- Mission type: Early warning
- COSPAR ID: 1985-045A
- SATCAT no.: 15808
- Mission duration: 4 years

Spacecraft properties
- Spacecraft type: US-K
- Launch mass: 1,900 kilograms (4,200 lb)

Start of mission
- Launch date: 11 June 1985, 14:27 UTC
- Rocket: Molniya-M/2BL
- Launch site: Plesetsk Cosmodrome

End of mission
- Deactivated: 3 September 1987
- Decay date: 12 November 2005

Orbital parameters
- Reference system: Geocentric
- Regime: Molniya
- Perigee altitude: 602 kilometres (374 mi)
- Apogee altitude: 39,754 kilometres (24,702 mi)
- Inclination: 62.9 degrees
- Period: 717.82 minutes

Kosmos 1658 (Russian: Космос 1658 meaning Cosmos 1658) was a Soviet US-K missile early warning satellite which was launched in 1985 as part of the Soviet military's Oko programme. The satellite was designed to identify missile launches using optical telescopes and infrared sensors.

Kosmos 1658 was launched from Site 41/1 at Plesetsk Cosmodrome in the Russian SSR. A Molniya-M carrier rocket with a 2BL upper stage was used to perform the launch, which took place at 14:27 UTC on 11 June 1985. The launch successfully placed the satellite into a molniya orbit. It subsequently received its Kosmos designation, and the international designator 1985-045A. The United States Space Command assigned it the Satellite Catalog Number 15808.

It re-entered the Earth's atmosphere on 12 November 2005.

== See also ==
- List of Kosmos satellites (1501–1750)
- List of R-7 launches (1985–1989)
- 1985 in spaceflight
- List of Oko satellites
