= Kosmos 1783 =

Soviet military missile early warning satellite

- Mission type: Early warning
- COSPAR ID: 1986-075A
- SATCAT no.: 16993
- Mission duration: 4 years

Spacecraft properties
- Spacecraft type: US-K
- Launch mass: 1,900 kilograms (4,200 lb)

Start of mission
- Launch date: 3 October 1986, 13:05 UTC
- Rocket: Molniya-M/2BL
- Launch site: Plesetsk Cosmodrome

Orbital parameters
- Reference system: Geocentric
- Regime: Molniya
- Perigee altitude: 611 kilometres (380 mi)
- Apogee altitude: 20,041 kilometres (12,453 mi)
- Inclination: 62.8 degrees
- Period: 358.10 minutes

Kosmos 1783 (Russian: Космос 1783 meaning Cosmos 1783) is a Soviet US-K missile early warning satellite which was launched in 1986 as part of the Soviet military's Oko programme. The satellite is designed to identify missile launches using optical telescopes and infrared sensors.

Kosmos 1783 was launched from Site 41/1 at Plesetsk Cosmodrome in the Russian SSR. A Molniya-M carrier rocket with a 2BL upper stage was used to perform the launch, which took place at 13:05 UTC on 3 October 1986. The launch placed the satellite into a molniya orbit but not into a usable orbit due to upper stage failure.

It subsequently received its Kosmos designation, and the international designator 1986-075A. The United States Space Command assigned it the Satellite Catalog Number 16993.

== See also ==
- List of Kosmos satellites (1751–2000)
- List of R-7 launches (1985–1989)
- 1986 in spaceflight
- List of Oko satellites
