= Kosmos 1785 =

Soviet military early warning satellite

- Mission type: Early warning
- COSPAR ID: 1986-078A
- SATCAT no.: 17031
- Mission duration: 4 years

Spacecraft properties
- Spacecraft type: US-K
- Launch mass: 1,900 kilograms (4,200 lb)

Start of mission
- Launch date: 15 October 1986, 09:29 UTC
- Rocket: Molniya-M/2BL
- Launch site: Plesetsk Cosmodrome

End of mission
- Decay date: 28 February 2002

Orbital parameters
- Reference system: Geocentric
- Regime: Molniya
- Perigee altitude: 633 kilometres (393 mi)
- Apogee altitude: 39,736 kilometres (24,691 mi)
- Inclination: 63.1 degrees
- Period: 718.08 minutes

Kosmos 1785 (Russian: Космос 1785 meaning Cosmos 1785) is a Soviet US-K missile early warning satellite which was launched in 1986 as part of the Soviet military's Oko programme. The satellite is designed to identify missile launches using optical telescopes and infrared sensors.

Kosmos 1785 was launched from Site 41/1 at Plesetsk Cosmodrome in the Russian SSR. A Molniya-M carrier rocket with a 2BL upper stage was used to perform the launch, which took place at 09:29 UTC on 15 October 1986. The launch successfully placed the satellite into a molniya orbit. It subsequently received its Kosmos designation, and the international designator 1986-078A. The United States Space Command assigned it the Satellite Catalog Number 17031.

It re-entered the Earth's atmosphere on 28 February 2002.

== See also ==
- List of Kosmos satellites (1751–2000)
- List of R-7 launches (1985–1989)
- 1986 in spaceflight
- List of Oko satellites
