= Kosmos 1661 =

Soviet military early warning satellite

- Mission type: Early warning
- COSPAR ID: 1985-049A
- SATCAT no.: 15827
- Mission duration: 4 years

Spacecraft properties
- Spacecraft type: US-K
- Launch mass: 1,900 kilograms (4,200 lb)

Start of mission
- Launch date: 18 June 1985, 00:40 UTC
- Rocket: Molniya-M/2BL
- Launch site: Plesetsk Cosmodrome

Orbital parameters
- Reference system: Geocentric
- Regime: Molniya
- Perigee altitude: 615 kilometres (382 mi)
- Apogee altitude: 39,735 kilometres (24,690 mi)
- Inclination: 62.9 degrees
- Period: 717.70 minutes

Kosmos 1661 (Russian: Космос 1661 meaning Cosmos 1661) is a Soviet US-K missile early warning satellite which was launched in 1985 as part of the Soviet military's Oko programme. The satellite is designed to identify missile launches using optical telescopes and infrared sensors.

Kosmos 1661 was launched from Site 16/2 at Plesetsk Cosmodrome in the Russian SSR. A Molniya-M carrier rocket with a 2BL upper stage was used to perform the launch, which took place at 00:40 UTC on 18 June 1985. The launch successfully placed the satellite into a molniya orbit. It subsequently received its Kosmos designation, and the international designator 1985-049A. The United States Space Command assigned it the Satellite Catalog Number 15827.

Podvig says that it moved from its orbital position immediately after launch, and was probably never functional.

== See also ==
- List of Kosmos satellites (1501–1750)
- List of R-7 launches (1985–1989)
- 1985 in spaceflight
- List of Oko satellites
