= Kosmos 1903 =

Soviet military early warning satellite

- Mission type: Early warning
- COSPAR ID: 1987-105A
- SATCAT no.: 18701
- Mission duration: 4 years

Spacecraft properties
- Spacecraft type: US-K
- Launch mass: 1,900 kilograms (4,200 lb)

Start of mission
- Launch date: 21 December 1987, 22:35 UTC
- Rocket: Molniya-M/2BL
- Launch site: Plesetsk Cosmodrome

Orbital parameters
- Reference system: Geocentric
- Regime: Molniya
- Perigee altitude: 605 kilometres (376 mi)
- Apogee altitude: 39,746 kilometres (24,697 mi)
- Inclination: 63.0 degrees
- Period: 717.72 minutes

Kosmos 1903 (Russian: Космос 1903 meaning Cosmos 1903) is a Soviet US-K missile early warning satellite which was launched in 1987 as part of the Soviet military's Oko programme. The satellite is designed to identify missile launches using optical telescopes and infrared sensors.

Kosmos 1903 was launched from Site 41/1 at Plesetsk Cosmodrome in the Russian SSR. A Molniya-M carrier rocket with a 2BL upper stage was used to perform the launch, which took place at 22:35 UTC on 21 December 1987. The launch successfully placed the satellite into a molniya orbit. It subsequently received its Kosmos designation, and the international designator 1987-105A. The United States Space Command assigned it the Satellite Catalog Number 18701.

== See also ==
- List of Kosmos satellites (1751–2000)
- List of R-7 launches (1985–1989)
- 1987 in spaceflight
- List of Oko satellites
