= Kosmos 2261 =

Russian military early warning satellite

- Mission type: Early warning
- COSPAR ID: 1993-051A
- SATCAT no.: 22741
- Mission duration: 4 years

Spacecraft properties
- Spacecraft type: US-K
- Launch mass: 1,900 kilograms (4,200 lb)

Start of mission
- Launch date: 10 August 1993, 14:53 UTC
- Rocket: Molniya-M/2BL
- Launch site: Plesetsk Cosmodrome

Orbital parameters
- Reference system: Geocentric
- Regime: Molniya
- Perigee altitude: 625 kilometres (388 mi)
- Apogee altitude: 39,725 kilometres (24,684 mi)
- Inclination: 62.9 degrees
- Period: 717.70 minutes

Kosmos 2261 (Russian: Космос 2261 meaning Cosmos 2261) is a Russian US-K missile early warning satellite which was launched in 1993 as part of the Russian Space Forces' Oko programme. The satellite is designed to identify missile launches using optical telescopes and infrared sensors. It was estimated in the west that it stopped functioning in March 1998, and reentered destructively on December 31, 2012. (the early morning of January 1, 2013 in some time zones)

Kosmos 2261 was launched from Site 16/2 at Plesetsk Cosmodrome in Russia. A Molniya-M carrier rocket with a 2BL upper stage was used to perform the launch, which took place at 14:53 UTC on 10 August 1993. The launch successfully placed the satellite into a molniya orbit. It subsequently received its Kosmos designation, and the international designator 1993-051A. The United States Space Command assigned it the Satellite Catalog Number 22741.

Its predicted re-entry time was December 31, 2012 at 11:29 UTC ± 2 hours.

== See also ==
- List of Kosmos satellites (2251–2500)
- List of R-7 launches (1990–1994)
- 1993 in spaceflight
- List of Oko satellites
