= Kosmos 1687 =

Russian military early warning satellite

- Mission type: Early warning
- COSPAR ID: 1985-088A
- SATCAT no.: 16103
- Mission duration: 4 years

Spacecraft properties
- Spacecraft type: US-K
- Launch mass: 1,900 kilograms (4,200 lb)

Start of mission
- Launch date: 30 September 1985, 19:23 UTC
- Rocket: Molniya-M/2BL
- Launch site: Plesetsk Cosmodrome

Orbital parameters
- Reference system: Geocentric
- Regime: Molniya
- Perigee altitude: 640 kilometres (400 mi)
- Apogee altitude: 39,712 kilometres (24,676 mi)
- Inclination: 62.9 degrees
- Period: 717.72 minutes

Kosmos 1687 (Russian: Космос 1687 meaning Cosmos 1687) is a Soviet US-K missile early warning satellite which was launched in 1985 as part of the Soviet military's Oko programme. The satellite is designed to identify missile launches using optical telescopes and infrared sensors.

Kosmos 1687 was launched from Site 16/2 at Plesetsk Cosmodrome in the Russian SSR. A Molniya-M carrier rocket with a 2BL upper stage was used to perform the launch, which took place at 19:23 UTC on 30 September 1985. The launch successfully placed the satellite into a molniya orbit. It subsequently received its Kosmos designation, and the international designator 1985-088A. The United States Space Command assigned it the Satellite Catalog Number 16103.

== See also ==
- List of Kosmos satellites (1501–1750)
- List of R-7 launches (1985–1989)
- 1985 in spaceflight
- List of Oko satellites
