= Kosmos 1774 =

Soviet military early warning satellite

- Mission type: Early warning
- COSPAR ID: 1986-065A
- SATCAT no.: 16922
- Mission duration: 4 years

Spacecraft properties
- Spacecraft type: US-K
- Launch mass: 1,900 kilograms (4,200 lb)

Start of mission
- Launch date: 28 August 1986, 08:02 UTC
- Rocket: Molniya-M/2BL
- Launch site: Plesetsk Cosmodrome

End of mission
- Decay date: 02 November 2010

Orbital parameters
- Reference system: Geocentric
- Regime: Molniya
- Perigee altitude: 622 kilometres (386 mi)
- Apogee altitude: 39,719 kilometres (24,680 mi)
- Inclination: 63.0 degrees
- Period: 717.52 minutes

Kosmos 1774 (Russian: Космос 1774 meaning Cosmos 1774) was a Soviet US-K missile early warning satellite launched in 1986 as part of the Soviet military's Oko programme. The satellite is designed to identify missile launches using optical telescopes and infrared sensors.

Kosmos 1774 was launched from Site 16/2 at Plesetsk Cosmodrome in the Russian SSR. A Molniya-M carrier rocket with a 2BL upper stage was used to perform the launch, which took place at 08:02 UTC on 28 August 1986. The launch successfully placed the satellite into a molniya orbit. It subsequently received its Kosmos designation, and the international designator 1986-065A. The United States Space Command assigned it the Satellite Catalog Number 16922.

It re-entered the Earth's atmosphere on 2 November 2010.

== See also ==
- List of Kosmos satellites (1751–2000)
- List of R-7 launches (1985–1989)
- 1986 in spaceflight
- List of Oko satellites
