= Kosmos 1977 =

Soviet military early warning satellite

- Mission type: Early warning
- COSPAR ID: 1988-096A
- SATCAT no.: 19608
- Mission duration: 4 years

Spacecraft properties
- Spacecraft type: US-K
- Launch mass: 1,900 kilograms (4,200 lb)

Start of mission
- Launch date: 25 October 1988, 18:02 UTC
- Rocket: Molniya-M/2BL
- Launch site: Plesetsk Cosmodrome

Orbital parameters
- Reference system: Geocentric
- Regime: Molniya
- Perigee altitude: 654 kilometres (406 mi)
- Apogee altitude: 39,703 kilometres (24,670 mi)
- Inclination: 62.9 degrees
- Period: 717.82 minutes

Kosmos 1977 (Russian: Космос 1977 meaning Cosmos 1977) is a Soviet US-K missile early warning satellite which was launched in 1988 as part of the Soviet military's Oko programme. The satellite is designed to identify missile launches using optical telescopes and infrared sensors.

Kosmos 1977 was launched from Site 41/1 at Plesetsk Cosmodrome in the Russian SSR. A Molniya-M carrier rocket with a 2BL upper stage was used to perform the launch, which took place at 18:02 UTC on 25 October 1988. The launch successfully placed the satellite into a molniya orbit. It subsequently received its Kosmos designation, and the international designator 1988-096A. The United States Space Command assigned it the Satellite Catalog Number 19608.

== See also ==
- List of Kosmos satellites (1751–2000)
- List of R-7 launches (1985–1989)
- 1988 in spaceflight
- List of Oko satellites
