= Kosmos 1966 =

Soviet military early warning satellite

- Mission type: Early warning
- COSPAR ID: 1988-076A
- SATCAT no.: 19445
- Mission duration: 4 years

Spacecraft properties
- Spacecraft type: US-K
- Launch mass: 1,900 kilograms (4,200 lb)

Start of mission
- Launch date: 30 August 1988, 14:14 UTC
- Rocket: Molniya-M/2BL
- Launch site: Plesetsk Cosmodrome

End of mission
- Decay date: 10 November 2005

Orbital parameters
- Reference system: Geocentric
- Regime: Molniya
- Perigee altitude: 640 kilometres (400 mi)
- Apogee altitude: 39,717 kilometres (24,679 mi)
- Inclination: 62.9 degrees
- Period: 717.84 minutes

Kosmos 1966 (Russian: Космос 1966 meaning Cosmos 1966) is a Soviet US-K missile early warning satellite which was launched in 1988 as part of the Soviet military's Oko programme. The satellite is designed to identify missile launches using optical telescopes and infrared sensors.

Kosmos 1966 was launched from Site 16/2 at Plesetsk Cosmodrome in the Russian SSR. A Molniya-M carrier rocket with a 2BL upper stage was used to perform the launch, which took place at 14:14 UTC on 30 August 1988. The launch successfully placed the satellite into a molniya orbit. It subsequently received its Kosmos designation, and the international designator 1988-076A . The United States Space Command assigned it the Satellite Catalog Number 19445.

It re-entered the Earth's atmosphere on 10 November 2005.

== See also ==
- List of Kosmos satellites (1751–2000)
- List of R-7 launches (1985–1989)
- 1988 in spaceflight
- List of Oko satellites
