= Kosmos 1761 =

Soviet military early warning satellite

- Mission type: Early warning
- COSPAR ID: 1986-050A
- SATCAT no.: 16849
- Mission duration: 4 years

Spacecraft properties
- Spacecraft type: US-K
- Launch mass: 1,900 kilograms (4,200 lb)

Start of mission
- Launch date: 5 July 1986, 01:16 UTC
- Rocket: Molniya-M/2BL
- Launch site: Plesetsk Cosmodrome

Orbital parameters
- Reference system: Geocentric
- Regime: Molniya
- Perigee altitude: 615 kilometres (382 mi)
- Apogee altitude: 39,739 kilometres (24,693 mi)
- Inclination: 62.9 degrees
- Period: 717.78 minutes

Kosmos 1761 (Russian: Космос 1761 meaning Cosmos 1761) is a Soviet US-K missile early warning satellite which was launched in 1986 as part of the Soviet military's Oko programme. The satellite is designed to identify missile launches using optical telescopes and infrared sensors.

Kosmos 1761 was launched from Site 43/4 at Plesetsk Cosmodrome in the Russian SSR. A Molniya-M carrier rocket with a 2BL upper stage was used to perform the launch, which took place at 01:16 UTC on 5 July 1986. The launch successfully placed the satellite into a molniya orbit. It subsequently received its Kosmos designation, and the international designator 1986-050A. The United States Space Command assigned it the Satellite Catalog Number 16849.

== See also ==
- List of Kosmos satellites (1751–2000)
- List of R-7 launches (1985–1989)
- 1986 in spaceflight
- List of Oko satellites
