= Kosmos 1729 =

Soviet military early warning satellite

- Mission type: Early warning
- COSPAR ID: 1986-011A
- SATCAT no.: 16527
- Mission duration: 4 years

Spacecraft properties
- Spacecraft type: US-K
- Launch mass: 1,900 kilograms (4,200 lb)

Start of mission
- Launch date: 1 February 1986, 18:11 UTC
- Rocket: Molniya-M/2BL
- Launch site: Plesetsk Cosmodrome

Orbital parameters
- Reference system: Geocentric
- Regime: Molniya
- Perigee altitude: 641 kilometres (398 mi)
- Apogee altitude: 39,729 kilometres (24,686 mi)
- Inclination: 62.8 degrees
- Period: 718.10 minutes

Kosmos 1729 (Russian: Космос 1729 meaning Cosmos 1729) is a Soviet US-K missile early warning satellite which was launched in 1986 as part of the Soviet military's Oko programme. The satellite is designed to identify missile launches using optical telescopes and infrared sensors.

Kosmos 1729 was launched from Site 16/2 at Plesetsk Cosmodrome in the Russian SSR. A Molniya-M carrier rocket with a 2BL upper stage was used to perform the launch, which took place at 18:11 UTC on 1 February 1986. The launch successfully placed the satellite into a molniya orbit. It subsequently received its Kosmos designation, and the international designator 1986-011A. The United States Space Command assigned it the Satellite Catalog Number 16527.

== See also ==
- 1986 in spaceflight
- List of Kosmos satellites (1501–1750)
- List of Oko satellites
- List of R-7 launches (1985–1989)
