= Kosmos 1675 =

Soviet military early warning satellite

- Mission type: Early warning
- COSPAR ID: 1985-071A
- SATCAT no.: 15952
- Mission duration: 4 years

Spacecraft properties
- Spacecraft type: US-K
- Launch mass: 1,900 kilograms (4,200 lb)

Start of mission
- Launch date: 12 August 1985, 15:09 UTC
- Rocket: Molniya-M/2BL
- Launch site: Plesetsk Cosmodrome

End of mission
- Deactivated: 18 January 1986

Orbital parameters
- Reference system: Geocentric
- Regime: Molniya
- Perigee altitude: 629 kilometres (391 mi)
- Apogee altitude: 39,718 kilometres (24,680 mi)
- Inclination: 62.8 degrees
- Period: 717.64 minutes

Kosmos 1675 (Russian: Космос 1675 meaning Cosmos 1675) is a Soviet US-K missile early warning satellite which was launched in 1985 as part of the Soviet military's Oko programme. The satellite is designed to identify missile launches using optical telescopes and infrared sensors.

Kosmos 1675 was launched from Site 16/42 at Plesetsk Cosmodrome in the Russian SSR. A Molniya-M carrier rocket with a 2BL upper stage was used to perform the launch, which took place at 15:09 UTC on 12 August 1985. The launch successfully placed the satellite into a molniya orbit. It subsequently received its Kosmos designation, and the international designator 1985-071A. The United States Space Command assigned it the Satellite Catalog Number 15952.

== See also ==
- List of Kosmos satellites (1501–1750)
- List of R-7 launches (1985–1989)
- 1985 in spaceflight
- List of Oko satellites
