= Kosmos 1701 =

Soviet military early warning satellite

- Mission type: Early warning
- COSPAR ID: 1985-105A
- SATCAT no.: 16235
- Mission duration: 4 years

Spacecraft properties
- Spacecraft type: US-K
- Launch mass: 1,900 kilograms (4,200 lb)

Start of mission
- Launch date: 9 November 1985, 08:25 UTC
- Rocket: Molniya-M/2BL
- Launch site: Plesetsk Cosmodrome

End of mission
- Decay date: 11 May 2011

Orbital parameters
- Reference system: Geocentric
- Regime: Molniya
- Perigee altitude: 656 kilometres (408 mi)
- Apogee altitude: 39,701 kilometres (24,669 mi)
- Inclination: 63.1 degrees
- Period: 717.82 minutes

Kosmos 1701 (Russian: Космос 1701 meaning Cosmos 1701) is a Soviet US-K missile early warning satellite which was launched in 1985 as part of the Soviet military's Oko programme. The satellite is designed to identify missile launches using optical telescopes and infrared sensors.

Kosmos 1701 was launched from Site 41/1 at Plesetsk Cosmodrome in the Russian SSR. A Molniya-M carrier rocket with a 2BL upper stage was used to perform the launch, which took place at 08:25 UTC on 9 November 1985. The launch successfully placed the satellite into a molniya orbit. It subsequently received its Kosmos designation, and the international designator 1985-105A. The United States Space Command assigned it the Satellite Catalog Number 16235.

It re-entered the Earth's atmosphere on 11 May 2011.

== See also ==
- List of Kosmos satellites (1501–1750)
- List of R-7 launches (1985–1989)
- 1985 in spaceflight
- List of Oko satellites
