= Kosmos 1684 =

Soviet military early warning satellite

- Mission type: Early warning
- COSPAR ID: 1985-084A
- SATCAT no.: 16064
- Mission duration: 4 years

Spacecraft properties
- Spacecraft type: US-K
- Launch mass: 1,900 kilograms (4,200 lb)

Start of mission
- Launch date: 24 September 1985, 01:18 UTC
- Rocket: Molniya-M/2BL
- Launch site: Plesetsk Cosmodrome

Orbital parameters
- Reference system: Geocentric
- Regime: Molniya
- Perigee altitude: 597 kilometres (371 mi)
- Apogee altitude: 39,753 kilometres (24,701 mi)
- Inclination: 62.9 degrees
- Period: 717.68 minutes

Kosmos 1684 (Russian: Космос 1684 meaning Cosmos 1684) is a Soviet US-K missile early warning satellite which was launched in 1985 as part of the Soviet military's Oko programme. The satellite is designed to identify missile launches using optical telescopes and infrared sensors.

Kosmos 1684 was launched from Site 43/4 at Plesetsk Cosmodrome in the Russian SSR. A Molniya-M carrier rocket with a 2BL upper stage was used to perform the launch, which took place at 01:18 UTC on 24 September 1985. The launch successfully placed the satellite into a molniya orbit. It subsequently received its Kosmos designation, and the international designator 1985-084A. The United States Space Command assigned it the Satellite Catalog Number 16064.

== See also ==
- List of Kosmos satellites (1501–1750)
- List of R-7 launches (1985–1989)
- 1985 in spaceflight
- List of Oko satellites
