= List of R-7 launches (1985–1989) =

This is a list of launches made by the R-7 Semyorka ICBM, and its derivatives between 1985 and 1989. All launches are orbital satellite launches, unless stated otherwise.

Date and time (GMT)	Configuration	Serial number	Launch site	Result	Payload	Remarks
== 1985 ==
9 January 1985, 10:45	Soyuz-U (11A511U)		LC-31/6, Baikonur	Successful	Kosmos 1616 (Yantar-4K2)	
16 January 1985, 06:22	Molniya-M (8K78M)		LC-43/4, Plesetsk	Successful	Molniya 3-36L	
16 January 1985, 08:19	Soyuz-U (11A511U)		LC-1/5, Baikonur	Successful	Kosmos 1623 (Zenit-8)	
6 February 1985, 11:00	Soyuz-U (11A511U)		LC-16/2, Plesetsk	Successful	Kosmos 1628 (Zenit-8)	
27 February 1985, 11:10	Soyuz-U (11A511U)		LC-31/6, Baikonur	Successful	Kosmos 1630 (Yantar-4K2)	
1 March 1985, 10:40	Soyuz-U (11A511U)		LC-41/1, Plesetsk	Successful	Kosmos 1632 (Zenit-8)	
25 March 1985, 10:00	Soyuz-U (11A511U)		LC-1/5, Baikonur	Successful	Kosmos 1643 (Yantar-4KS1)	
3 April 1985, 08:40	Soyuz-U (11A511U)		LC-31/6, Baikonur	Successful	Kosmos 1644 (Zenit-8)	
16 April 1985, 17:15	Soyuz-U (11A511U)		LC-41/1, Plesetsk	Successful	Kosmos 1645 (Foton)	
19 April 1985, 14:00	Soyuz-U (11A511U)		LC-41/1, Plesetsk	Successful	Kosmos 1647 (Yantar-4K2)	
25 April 1985, 09:30	Soyuz-U (11A511U)		LC-43/4, Plesetsk	Successful	Kosmos 1648 (Zenit-8)	
26 April 1985, 05:48	Molniya-M (8K78M)		LC-31/6, Baikonur	Successful	Prognoz 10 (Interkosmos 23)	
15 May 1985, 12:40	Soyuz-U (11A511U)		LC-43/4, Plesetsk	Successful	Kosmos 1649 (Zenit-8)	
22 May 1985, 08:35	Soyuz-U (11A511U)		LC-41/1, Plesetsk	Successful	Kosmos 1653 (Resurs-F1)	
23 May 1985, 12:40	Soyuz-U (11A511U)		LC-31/6, Baikonur	Successful	Kosmos 1654 (Yantar-4K2)	
29 May 1985, 07:40	Molniya-M (8K78M)		LC-43/4, Plesetsk	Successful	Molniya 3-39L	
6 June 1985, 06:39	Soyuz-U2 (11A511U2)		LC-1/5, Baikonur	Successful	Soyuz T-13	Crewed orbital flight, 2 cosmonauts Docked with Salyut 7
7 June 1985, 07:45	Soyuz-U (11A511U)		LC-43/4, Plesetsk	Successful	Kosmos 1657 (Resurs-F1)	
11 June 1985, 14:27	Molniya-M (8K78M)		LC-41/1, Plesetsk	Successful	Kosmos 1658 (Oko)	
13 June 1985, 12:20	Soyuz-U (11A511U)		LC-16/2, Plesetsk	Successful	Kosmos 1659 (Zenit-8)	
18 June 1985, 00:40	Molniya-M (8K78M)		LC-16/2, Plesetsk	Successful	Kosmos 1661 (Oko)	
21 June 1985, 00:39	Soyuz-U (11A511U)		LC-1/5, Baikonur	Successful	Progress 24	Salyut 7 Logistics
21 June 1985, 07:45	Soyuz-U (11A511U)		LC-41/1, Plesetsk	Successful	Kosmos 1663 (Resurs-F1)	
26 June 1985, 12:35	Soyuz-U (11A511U)		LC-43/4, Plesetsk	Successful	Kosmos 1664 (Zenit-8)	
3 July 1985, 12:10	Soyuz-U (11A511U)		LC-16/2, Plesetsk	Successful	Kosmos 1665 (Zenit-8)	
10 July 1985, 03:15	Soyuz-U (11A511U)		LC-16/2, Plesetsk	Successful	Kosmos 1667 (Bion)	
15 July 1985, 06:30	Soyuz-U (11A511U)		LC-31/6, Baikonur	Successful	Kosmos 1668 (Zenit-8)	
17 July 1985, 01:05	Molniya-M (8K78M)		LC-43/4, Plesetsk	Successful	Molniya 3-37L	
19 July 1985, 13:05	Soyuz-U (11A511U)		LC-1/5, Baikonur	Successful	Kosmos 1669 (Progress 7K-TG)	Salyut 7 Logistics
2 August 1985, 11:40	Soyuz-U (11A511U)		LC-16/2, Plesetsk	Successful	Kosmos 1671 (Zenit-8)	
7 August 1985, 09:50	Soyuz-U (11A511U)		LC-43/4, Plesetsk	Successful	Kosmos 1672 (Resurs-F1)	
8 August 1985, 10:19	Soyuz-U (11A511U)		LC-1/5, Baikonur	Successful	Kosmos 1673 (Yantar-1KFT)	
12 August 1985, 15:09	Molniya-M (8K78M)		LC-16/2, Plesetsk	Successful	Kosmos 1675 (Oko)	
16 August 1985, 15:10	Soyuz-U (11A511U)		LC-41/1, Plesetsk	Successful	Kosmos 1676 (Yantar-4K2)	
22 August 1985, 19:28	Molniya-M (8K78M)		LC-41/1, Plesetsk	Successful	Molniya 1-64	
29 August 1985, 10:15	Soyuz-U (11A511U)		LC-41/1, Plesetsk	Successful	Kosmos 1678 (Resurs-F1)	
29 August 1985, 11:33	Soyuz-U (11A511U)		LC-31/6, Baikonur	Successful	Kosmos 1679 (Yantar-4K2)	
6 September 1985, 10:45	Soyuz-U (11A511U)		LC-41/1, Plesetsk	Successful	Kosmos 1681 (Zenit-4MKT)	
17 September 1985, 12:38	Soyuz-U2 (11A511U2)		LC-1/5, Baikonur	Successful	Soyuz T-14	Crewed orbital flight, 3 cosmonauts Docked with Salyut 7
19 September 1985, 10:10	Soyuz-U (11A511U)		LC-41/1, Plesetsk	Successful	Kosmos 1683 (Zenit-8)	
24 September 1985, 01:18	Molniya-M (8K78M)		LC-43/4, Plesetsk	Successful	Kosmos 1684 (Oko)	
26 September 1985, 11:15	Soyuz-U (11A511U)		LC-16/2, Plesetsk	Successful	Kosmos 1685 (Zenit-8)	
30 September 1985, 19:23	Molniya-M (8K78M)		LC-16/2, Plesetsk	Successful	Kosmos 1687 (Oko)	
3 October 1985, 05:48	Vostok-2M (8A92M)		LC-31/6, Baikonur	Successful	Kosmos 1689 (Resurs-O1)	
3 October 1985, 07:33	Molniya-M (8K78M)		LC-43/4, Plesetsk	Successful	Molniya 3-38L	
16 October 1985, 09:25	Soyuz-U (11A511U)		LC-31/6, Baikonur	Successful	Kosmos 1696 (Zenit-8)	
22 October 1985, 20:24	Molniya-M (8K78M)		LC-43/4, Plesetsk	Successful	Kosmos 1698 (Oko)	
23 October 1985, 00:42	Molniya-M (8K78M)		LC-1/5, Baikonur	Successful	Molniya 1-65	
25 October 1985, 14:40	Soyuz-U (11A511U)		LC-16/2, Plesetsk	Successful	Kosmos 1699 (Yantar-4K2)	
28 October 1985, 17:24	Molniya-M (8K78M)		LC-43/4, Plesetsk	Successful	Molniya 1-66	
9 November 1985, 08:25	Molniya-M (8K78M)		LC-41/1, Plesetsk	Successful	Kosmos 1701 (Oko)	
13 November 1985, 12:25	Soyuz-U (11A511U)		LC-16/2, Plesetsk	Successful	Kosmos 1702 (Zenit-8)	
3 December 1985, 12:15	Soyuz-U (11A511U)		LC-16/2, Plesetsk	Successful	Kosmos 1705 (Zenit-8)	
11 December 1985, 14:40	Soyuz-U (11A511U)		LC-16/2, Plesetsk	Successful	Kosmos 1706 (Yantar-4K2)	
13 December 1985, 07:45	Soyuz-U (11A511U)		LC-43/4, Plesetsk	Successful	Kosmos 1708 (Resurs-F1)	
24 December 1985, 18:56	Molniya-M (8K78M)		LC-43/4, Plesetsk	Successful	Molniya 3-40L	
27 December 1985, 17:06	Soyuz-U (11A511U)		LC-41/1, Plesetsk	Successful	Kosmos 1713 (Efir)	
== 1986 ==
8 January 1986, 11:25	Soyuz-U (11A511U)		LC-43/4, Plesetsk	Successful	Kosmos 1715 (Zenit-8)	
15 January 1986, 14:20	Soyuz-U (11A511U)		LC-41/1, Plesetsk	Successful	Kosmos 1724 (Yantar-4K2)	
28 January 1986, 08:35	Soyuz-U (11A511U)		LC-1/5, Baikonur	Successful	Kosmos 1728 (Zenit-8)	
1 February 1986, 18:11	Molniya-M (8K78M)		LC-16/2, Plesetsk	Successful	Kosmos 1729 (Oko)	
4 February 1986, 11:15	Soyuz-U (11A511U)		LC-41/1, Plesetsk	Successful	Kosmos 1730 (Zenit-8)	
7 February 1986, 08:45	Soyuz-U (11A511U)		LC-1/5, Baikonur	Successful	Kosmos 1731 (Yantar-4KS1)	
26 February 1986, 13:40	Soyuz-U (11A511U)		LC-43/4, Plesetsk	Successful	Kosmos 1734 (Yantar-4K2)	
13 March 1986, 12:33	Soyuz-U2 (11A511U2)		LC-1/5, Baikonur	Successful	Soyuz T-15	Crewed orbital flight, 2 cosmonauts Docked with Mir and Salyut 7 First spacecraft to dock with two space stations
19 March 1986, 10:08	Soyuz-U2 (11A511U2)		LC-1/5, Baikonur	Successful	Progress 25	Mir Logistics
26 March 1986, 10:30	Soyuz-U (11A511U)		LC-31/6, Baikonur	Failure	Zenit-8	Blok D strap-on LOX vent valve failed to open at staging due to prelaunch damage. Strap-on collided with the core stage and ruptured its LOX tank.
9 April 1986, 08:00	Soyuz-U (11A511U)		LC-31/6, Baikonur	Successful	Kosmos 1739 (Yantar-4K2)	
15 April 1986, 11:40	Soyuz-U (11A511U)		LC-16/2, Plesetsk	Successful	Kosmos 1740 (Zenit-8)	
18 April 1986, 19:50	Molniya-M (8K78M)		LC-41/1, Plesetsk	Successful	Molniya 3-43L	
23 April 1986, 19:40	Soyuz-U2 (11A511U2)		LC-1/5, Baikonur	Successful	Progress 26	Mir Logistics
14 May 1986, 12:40	Soyuz-U (11A511U)		LC-16/2, Plesetsk	Successful	Kosmos 1742 (Zenit-8)	
21 May 1986, 08:21	Soyuz-U2 (11A511U2)		LC-1/5, Baikonur	Successful	Soyuz TM-1	Uncrewed test of modernised Soyuz-TM spacecraft Docked with Mir
21 May 1986, 16:30	Soyuz-U (11A511U)		LC-41/1, Plesetsk	Successful	Kosmos 1744 (Foton)	
28 May 1986, 07:50	Soyuz-U (11A511U)		LC-43/4, Plesetsk	Successful	Kosmos 1746 (Resurs-F1)	
29 May 1986, 09:20	Soyuz-U (11A511U)		LC-31/6, Baikonur	Successful	Kosmos 1747 (Zenit-8)	
6 June 1986, 12:40	Soyuz-U (11A511U)		LC-31/6, Baikonur	Successful	Kosmos 1756 (Yantar-4K2)	
11 June 1986, 07:45	Soyuz-U (11A511U)		LC-43/4, Plesetsk	Successful	Kosmos 1757 (Zenit-8)	
19 June 1986, 10:30	Soyuz-U (11A511U)		LC-1/5, Baikonur	Successful	Kosmos 1760 (Zenit-8)	
19 June 1986, 21:09	Molniya-M (8K78M)		LC-41/1, Plesetsk	Successful	Molniya 3-44L	
5 July 1986, 01:16	Molniya-M (8K78M)		LC-43/4, Plesetsk	Successful	Kosmos 1761 (Oko)	
10 July 1986, 08:00	Soyuz-U (11A511U)		LC-16/2, Plesetsk	Successful	Kosmos 1762 (Resurs-F1)	
17 July 1986, 12:30	Soyuz-U (11A511U)		LC-31/6, Baikonur	Successful	Kosmos 1764 (Yantar-4K2)	
24 July 1986, 12:30	Soyuz-U (11A511U)		LC-16/2, Plesetsk	Successful	Kosmos 1765 (Zenit-8)	
30 July 1986, 15:06	Molniya-M (8K78M)		LC-43/4, Plesetsk	Successful	Molniya 1-67	
2 August 1986, 09:20	Soyuz-U (11A511U)		LC-16/2, Plesetsk	Successful	Kosmos 1768 (Resurs-F1)	
6 August 1986, 13:30	Soyuz-U (11A511U)		LC-1/5, Baikonur	Successful	Kosmos 1770 (Yantar-4KS1)	
21 August 1986, 11:04	Soyuz-U (11A511U)		LC-43/4, Plesetsk	Successful	Kosmos 1772 (Zenit-8)	
27 August 1986, 11:40	Soyuz-U (11A511U)		LC-31/6, Baikonur	Successful	Kosmos 1773 (Yantar-4K2)	
28 August 1986, 08:02	Molniya-M (8K78M)		LC-16/2, Plesetsk	Successful	Kosmos 1774 (Oko)	
3 September 1986, 07:59	Soyuz-U (11A511U)		LC-31/6, Baikonur	Successful	Kosmos 1775 (Zenit-8)	
5 September 1986, 09:12	Molniya-M (8K78M)		LC-43/4, Plesetsk	Successful	Molniya 1-68	
17 September 1986, 07:59	Soyuz-U (11A511U)		LC-31/6, Baikonur	Successful	Kosmos 1781 (Zenit-8)	
3 October 1986, 13:05	Molniya-M (8K78M)		LC-41/1, Plesetsk	Partial Failure	Kosmos 1783 (Oko)	Blok L stage shut down prematurely due to an electrical malfunction. Satellite left in useless orbit.
6 October 1986, 07:40	Soyuz-U (11A511U)		LC-1/5, Baikonur	Successful	Kosmos 1784 (Yantar-1KFT)	
15 October 1986, 09:29	Molniya-M (8K78M)		LC-41/1, Plesetsk	Successful	Kosmos 1785 (Oko)	
20 October 1986, 08:49	Molniya-M (8K78M)		LC-43/4, Plesetsk	Successful	Molniya 3-41L	
22 October 1986, 09:00	Soyuz-U (11A511U)		LC-1/5, Baikonur	Successful	Kosmos 1787 (Zenit-8)	
31 October 1986, 08:00	Soyuz-U (11A511U)		LC-16/2, Plesetsk	Successful	Kosmos 1789 (Resurs-F1)	
4 November 1986, 11:50	Soyuz-U (11A511U)		LC-16/2, Plesetsk	Successful	Kosmos 1790 (Zenit-8)	
13 November 1986, 10:59	Soyuz-U (11A511U)		LC-31/6, Baikonur	Successful	Kosmos 1792 (Yantar-4K2)	
15 November 1986, 21:34	Molniya-M (8K78M)		LC-41/1, Plesetsk	Successful	Molniya 1-69	
20 November 1986, 12:09	Molniya-M (8K78M)		LC-16/2, Plesetsk	Successful	Kosmos 1793 (Oko)	
4 December 1986, 10:10	Soyuz-U (11A511U)		LC-1/5, Baikonur	Successful	Kosmos 1804 (Zenit-8)	
12 December 1986, 18:35	Molniya-M (8K78M)		LC-43/4, Plesetsk	Successful	Kosmos 1806 (Oko)	
16 December 1986, 14:00	Soyuz-U (11A511U)		LC-41/1, Plesetsk	Successful	Kosmos 1807 (Yantar-4K2)	
26 December 1986, 11:00	Soyuz-U (11A511U)		LC-1/5, Baikonur	Successful	Kosmos 1810 (Yantar-4KS1)	
26 December 1986, 15:25	Molniya-M (8K78M)		LC-43/3, Plesetsk	Successful	Molniya 1-70	
== 1987 ==
9 January 1987, 12:38	Soyuz-U (11A511U)		LC-31/6, Baikonur	Successful	Kosmos 1811 (Yantar-4K2)	
15 January 1987, 11:20	Soyuz-U (11A511U)		LC-43/3, Plesetsk	Successful	Kosmos 1813 (Zenit-8)	
16 January 1987, 06:06	Soyuz-U2 (11A511U2)		LC-1/5, Baikonur	Successful	Progress 27	Mir Logistics
22 January 1987, 16:06	Molniya-M (8K78M)		LC-41/1, Plesetsk	Successful	Molniya 3-42L	
5 February 1987, 21:38	Soyuz-U2 (11A511U2)		LC-1/5, Baikonur	Successful	Soyuz TM-2	Crewed orbital flight, 2 cosmonauts Docked with Mir
7 February 1987, 10:30	Soyuz-U (11A511U)		LC-43/4, Plesetsk	Successful	Kosmos 1819 (Zenit-8)	
19 February 1987, 10:15	Soyuz-U (11A511U)		LC-16/2, Plesetsk	Successful	Kosmos 1822 (Zenit-8)	
26 February 1987, 13:30	Soyuz-U (11A511U)		LC-41/1, Plesetsk	Successful	Kosmos 1824 (Yantar-4K2)	
3 March 1987, 11:14	Soyuz-U2 (11A511U2)		LC-1/5, Baikonur	Successful	Progress 28	Mir Logistics
11 March 1987, 10:25	Soyuz-U (11A511U)		LC-16/2, Plesetsk	Successful	Kosmos 1826 (Zenit-8)	
9 April 1987, 11:44	Soyuz-U (11A511U)		LC-1/5, Baikonur	Successful	Kosmos 1835 (Yantar-4K2)	
16 April 1987, 06:18	Soyuz-U (11A511U)		LC-1/5, Baikonur	Successful	Kosmos 1836 (Yantar-4KS1)	
21 April 1987, 15:14	Soyuz-U2 (11A511U2)		LC-1/5, Baikonur	Successful	Progress 29	Mir Logistics
22 April 1987, 09:10	Soyuz-U (11A511U)		LC-43/3, Plesetsk	Successful	Kosmos 1837 (Zenit-8)	
24 April 1987, 17:00	Soyuz-U (11A511U)		LC-41/1, Plesetsk	Successful	Kosmos 1841 (Foton)	
5 May 1987, 09:15	Soyuz-U (11A511U)		LC-31/6, Baikonur	Successful	Kosmos 1843 (Zenit-8)	
13 May 1987, 06:00	Soyuz-U (11A511U)		LC-31/6, Baikonur	Successful	Kosmos 1845 (Zenit-8)	
19 May 1987, 04:02	Soyuz-U2 (11A511U2)		LC-1/5, Baikonur	Successful	Progress 30	Mir Logistics
21 May 1987, 07:45	Soyuz-U (11A511U)		LC-43/4, Plesetsk	Successful	Kosmos 1846 (Resurs-F1)	
26 May 1987, 13:39	Soyuz-U (11A511U)		LC-16/2, Plesetsk	Successful	Kosmos 1847 (Yantar-4K2)	
28 May 1987, 12:44	Soyuz-U (11A511U)		LC-43/4, Plesetsk	Successful	Kosmos 1848 (Zenit-8)	
4 June 1987, 18:50	Molniya-M (8K78M)		LC-16/2, Plesetsk	Successful	Kosmos 1849 (Oko)	
12 June 1987, 07:40	Molniya-M (8K78M)		LC-43/4, Plesetsk	Successful	Kosmos 1851 (Oko)	
18 June 1987, 07:25	Soyuz-U (11A511U)		LC-43/3, Plesetsk	Failure	Resurs-F1	Ingested debris causes fire and explosion in the Blok D LOX turbopump at T+6 seconds. The booster crashed a few hundred meters from LC-43/3 which was badly damaged and not used again for more than a year.
4 July 1987, 12:25	Soyuz-U (11A511U)		LC-41/1, Plesetsk	Successful	Kosmos 1863 (Zenit-8)	
8 July 1987, 10:59	Soyuz-U (11A511U)		LC-1/5, Baikonur	Successful	Kosmos 1865 (Yantar-1KFT)	
9 July 1987, 16:10	Soyuz-U (11A511U)		LC-16/2, Plesetsk	Successful	Kosmos 1866 (Yantar-4K2)	
22 July 1987, 01:59	Soyuz-U2 (11A511U2)		LC-1/5, Baikonur	Successful	Soyuz TM-3	Crewed orbital flight, 3 cosmonauts Docked with Mir
3 August 1987, 20:44	Soyuz-U2 (11A511U2)		LC-1/5, Baikonur	Successful	Progress 31	Mir Logistics
19 August 1987, 06:59	Soyuz-U (11A511U)		LC-43/4, Plesetsk	Successful	Kosmos 1872 (Zenit-8)	
3 September 1987, 10:25	Soyuz-U (11A511U)		LC-43/4, Plesetsk	Successful	Kosmos 1874 (Zenit-8)	
11 September 1987, 02:06	Soyuz-U (11A511U)		LC-1/5, Baikonur	Successful	Kosmos 1881 (Yantar-4KS1)	
15 September 1987, 10:30	Soyuz-U (11A511U)		LC-43/4, Plesetsk	Successful	Kosmos 1882 (Resurs-F1)	
17 September 1987, 14:59	Soyuz-U (11A511U)		LC-41/1, Plesetsk	Successful	Kosmos 1886 (Yantar-4K2)	
23 September 1987, 23:43	Soyuz-U2 (11A511U2)		LC-1/5, Baikonur	Successful	Progress 32	Mir Logistics
29 September 1987, 12:50	Soyuz-U (11A511U)		LC-41/1, Plesetsk	Successful	Kosmos 1887 (Bion)	
9 October 1987, 08:30	Soyuz-U (11A511U)		LC-1/5, Baikonur	Successful	Kosmos 1889 (Zenit-8)	
22 October 1987, 14:25	Soyuz-U (11A511U)		LC-16/2, Plesetsk	Successful	Kosmos 1893 (Yantar-4K2)	
11 November 1987, 09:04	Soyuz-U (11A511U)		LC-31/6, Baikonur	Successful	Kosmos 1895 (Zenit-8)	
14 November 1987, 09:29	Soyuz-U (11A511U)		LC-1/5, Baikonur	Successful	Kosmos 1896 (Yantar-1KFT)	
20 November 1987, 23:47	Soyuz-U2 (11A511U2)		LC-1/5, Baikonur	Successful	Progress 33	Mir Logistics
7 December 1987, 08:50	Soyuz-U (11A511U)		LC-31/6, Baikonur	Successful	Kosmos 1899 (Zenit-8)	
14 December 1987, 11:29	Soyuz-U (11A511U)		LC-31/6, Baikonur	Successful	Kosmos 1901 (Yantar-4K2)	
21 December 1987, 11:18	Soyuz-U2 (11A511U2)		LC-1/5, Baikonur	Successful	Soyuz TM-4	Crewed orbital flight, 3 cosmonauts Docked with Mir
21 December 1987, 22:35	Molniya-M (8K78M)		LC-41/1, Plesetsk	Successful	Kosmos 1903 (Oko)	
25 December 1987, 08:45	Soyuz-U (11A511U)		LC-31/6, Baikonur	Successful	Kosmos 1905 (Zenit-8)	
26 December 1987, 11:30	Soyuz-U (11A511U)		LC-16/2, Plesetsk	Successful	Kosmos 1906 (Resurs-F2)	
29 December 1987, 11:40	Soyuz-U (11A511U)		LC-43/4, Plesetsk	Successful	Kosmos 1907 (Zenit-8)	
== 1988 ==
20 January 1988, 22:51	Soyuz-U2 (11A511U2)		LC-1/5, Baikonur	Successful	Progress 34	Mir Logistics
26 January 1988, 11:20	Soyuz-U (11A511U)		LC-41/1, Plesetsk	Successful	Kosmos 1915 (Zenit-8)	
3 February 1988, 12:15	Soyuz-U (11A511U)		LC-31/6, Baikonur	Successful	Kosmos 1916 (Yantar-4K2)	
18 February 1988, 09:50	Soyuz-U (11A511U)		LC-16/2, Plesetsk	Successful	Kosmos 1920 (Resurs-F1)	
19 February 1988, 08:00	Soyuz-U (11A511U)		LC-1/5, Baikonur	Successful	Kosmos 1921 (Zenit-8)	
26 February 1988, 09:31	Molniya-M (8K78M)		LC-41/1, Plesetsk	Successful	Kosmos 1922 (Oko)	
10 March 1988, 10:30	Soyuz-U (11A511U)		LC-43/4, Plesetsk	Successful	Kosmos 1923 (Zenit-8)	
11 March 1988, 06:38	Molniya-M (8K78M)		LC-1/5, Baikonur	Successful	Molniya 1-71	
17 March 1988, 06:43	Vostok-2M (8A92M)		LC-31/6, Baikonur	Successful	IRS-1A	
17 March 1988, 20:55	Molniya-M (8K78M)		LC-43/4, Plesetsk	Successful	Molniya 1-72	
23 March 1988, 21:05	Soyuz-U2 (11A511U2)		LC-1/5, Baikonur	Successful	Progress 35	Mir Logistics
24 March 1988, 14:10	Soyuz-U (11A511U)		LC-16/2, Plesetsk	Successful	Kosmos 1935 (Yantar-4K2)	
30 March 1988, 12:00	Soyuz-U (11A511U)		LC-1/5, Baikonur	Successful	Kosmos 1936 (Yantar-4KS1)	
11 April 1988, 11:15	Soyuz-U (11A511U)		LC-16/2, Plesetsk	Successful	Kosmos 1938 (Zenit-8)	
14 April 1988, 17:00	Soyuz-U (11A511U)		LC-41/1, Plesetsk	Successful	Foton 1	
20 April 1988, 05:48	Vostok-2M (8A92M)		LC-31/6, Baikonur	Successful	Kosmos 1939 (Resurs-O1)	
27 April 1988, 09:10	Soyuz-U (11A511U)		LC-31/6, Baikonur	Successful	Kosmos 1941 (Zenit-8)	
12 May 1988, 14:40	Soyuz-U (11A511U)		LC-43/4, Plesetsk	Successful	Kosmos 1942 (Yantar-4K2)	
13 May 1988, 00:30	Soyuz-U2 (11A511U2)		LC-1/5, Baikonur	Successful	Progress 36	Mir Logistics
18 May 1988, 10:30	Soyuz-U (11A511U)		LC-1/5, Baikonur	Successful	Kosmos 1944 (Yantar-1KFT)	
19 May 1988, 09:15	Soyuz-U (11A511U)		LC-31/6, Baikonur	Successful	Kosmos 1945 (Zenit-8)	
26 May 1988, 15:27	Molniya-M (8K78M)		LC-43/4, Plesetsk	Successful	Molniya 3-49L	
31 May 1988, 07:45	Soyuz-U (11A511U)		LC-41/1, Plesetsk	Successful	Kosmos 1951 (Resurs-F1)	
7 June 1988, 14:03	Soyuz-U2 (11A511U2)		LC-1/5, Baikonur	Successful	Soyuz TM-5	Crewed orbital flight, 3 cosmonauts Docked with Mir
11 June 1988, 10:00	Soyuz-U (11A511U)		LC-1/5, Baikonur	Successful	Kosmos 1952 (Zenit-8)	
22 June 1988, 13:00	Soyuz-U (11A511U)		LC-1/5, Baikonur	Successful	Kosmos 1955 (Yantar-4K2)	
23 June 1988, 07:45	Soyuz-U (11A511U)		LC-41/1, Plesetsk	Successful	Kosmos 1956 (Zenit-8)	
7 July 1988, 08:05	Soyuz-U (11A511U)		LC-16/2, Plesetsk	Successful	Kosmos 1957 (Resurs-F1)	
9 July 1988, 13:25	Soyuz-U (11A511U)		LC-1/5, Baikonur	Failure	Yantar-4KS1	Short circuit results in voltage sag in booster electrical system at strap-on separation. Automatic shutdown command issued T+122 seconds.
18 July 1988, 21:13	Soyuz-U2 (11A511U2)		LC-1/5, Baikonur	Successful	Progress 37	Mir Logistics
27 July 1988, 09:05	Soyuz-U (11A511U)		LC-43/4, Plesetsk	Failure	Resurs-F1	Accidental shutdown command at T+20 seconds due to wiring error in the AVD system. The booster fell back onto the pad and exploded, putting it out of commission for six months.
8 August 1988, 09:25	Soyuz-U (11A511U)		LC-1/5, Baikonur	Successful	Kosmos 1962 (Zenit-8)	
12 August 1988, 12:53	Molniya-M (8K78M)		LC-41/1, Plesetsk	Successful	Molniya 1-73	
16 August 1988, 13:00	Soyuz-U (11A511U)		LC-1/5, Baikonur	Successful	Kosmos 1963 (Yantar-4K2)	
23 August 1988, 09:20	Soyuz-U (11A511U)		LC-1/5, Baikonur	Successful	Kosmos 1964 (Zenit-8)	
23 August 1988, 11:15	Soyuz-U (11A511U)		LC-41/1, Plesetsk	Successful	Kosmos 1965 (Resurs-F2)	
29 August 1988, 04:23	Soyuz-U2 (11A511U2)		LC-1/5, Baikonur	Successful	Soyuz TM-6	Crewed orbital flight, 3 cosmonauts Docked with Mir
30 August 1988, 14:14	Molniya-M (8K78M)		LC-16/2, Plesetsk	Successful	Kosmos 1966 (Oko)	
6 September 1988, 07:30	Soyuz-U (11A511U)		LC-16/2, Plesetsk	Successful	Kosmos 1967 (Zenit-8)	
9 September 1988, 10:40	Soyuz-U (11A511U)		LC-41/1, Plesetsk	Successful	Kosmos 1968 (Resurs-F1)	
9 September 1988, 23:33	Soyuz-U2 (11A511U2)		LC-1/5, Baikonur	Successful	Progress 38	Mir Logistics
15 September 1988, 15:00	Soyuz-U (11A511U)		LC-41/1, Plesetsk	Successful	Kosmos 1969 (Yantar-4K2)	
22 September 1988, 10:20	Soyuz-U (11A511U)		LC-16/2, Plesetsk	Successful	Kosmos 1973 (Zenit-8)	
29 September 1988, 09:07	Molniya-M (8K78M)		LC-41/1, Plesetsk	Successful	Molniya 3-51L	
3 October 1988, 22:23	Molniya-M (8K78M)		LC-41/1, Plesetsk	Successful	Kosmos 1974 (Oko)	
13 October 1988, 11:19	Soyuz-U (11A511U)		LC-16/2, Plesetsk	Successful	Kosmos 1976 (Zenit-8)	
25 October 1988, 18:02	Molniya-M (8K78M)		LC-41/1, Plesetsk	Successful	Kosmos 1977 (Oko)	
27 October 1988, 11:31	Soyuz-U (11A511U)		LC-16/2, Plesetsk	Successful	Kosmos 1978 (Zenit-8)	
11 November 1988, 10:30	Soyuz-U (11A511U)		LC-1/5, Baikonur	Failure	Yantar-4KS1	Incorrect guidance program results in improper flight trajectory and no orbit
24 November 1988, 14:50	Soyuz-U (11A511U)		LC-41/1, Plesetsk	Successful	Kosmos 1981 (Zenit-8)	
26 November 1988, 15:49	Soyuz-U2 (11A511U2)		LC-1/5, Baikonur	Successful	Soyuz TM-7	Crewed orbital flight, 3 cosmonauts Docked with Mir
30 November 1988, 09:00	Soyuz-U (11A511U)		LC-1/5, Baikonur	Successful	Kosmos 1982 (Zenit-8)	
8 December 1988, 14:50	Soyuz-U (11A511U)		LC-43/3, Plesetsk	Successful	Kosmos 1983 (Zenit-8)	
16 December 1988, 19:00	Soyuz-U (11A511U)		LC-16/2, Plesetsk	Successful	Kosmos 1984 (Yantar-4K2)	
22 December 1988, 14:16	Molniya-M (8K78M)		LC-43/3, Plesetsk	Successful	Molniya 3-52L	
25 December 1988, 04:11	Soyuz-U2 (11A511U2)		LC-1/5, Baikonur	Successful	Progress 39	Mir Logistics
28 December 1988, 05:27	Molniya-M (8K78M)		LC-43/3, Plesetsk	Successful	Molniya 1-74	
29 December 1988, 10:00	Soyuz-U (11A511U)		LC-1/5, Baikonur	Successful	Kosmos 1986 (Yantar-1KFT)	
== 1989 ==
12 January 1989, 11:30	Soyuz-U (11A511U)		LC-16/2, Plesetsk	Successful	Kosmos 1990 (Resurs-F2)	
18 January 1989, 08:20	Soyuz-U (11A511U)		LC-1/5, Baikonur	Successful	Kosmos 1991 (Zenit-8)	
28 January 1989, 12:30	Soyuz-U (11A511U)		LC-1/5, Baikonur	Successful	Kosmos 1993 (Yantar-4K2)	
10 February 1989, 08:53	Soyuz-U2 (11A511U2)		LC-1/5, Baikonur	Successful	Progress 40	Mir Logistics
10 February 1989, 16:55	Soyuz-U (11A511U)		LC-41/1, Plesetsk	Successful	Kosmos 2000 (Zenit-8)	
14 February 1989, 04:21	Molniya-M (8K78M)		LC-43/3, Plesetsk	Successful	Kosmos 2001 (Oko)	
15 February 1989, 11:00	Molniya-M (8K78M)		LC-1/5, Baikonur	Successful	Molniya 1-75	
17 February 1989, 14:59	Soyuz-U (11A511U)		LC-43/3, Plesetsk	Successful	Kosmos 2003 (Zenit-8)	
2 March 1989, 18:59	Soyuz-U (11A511U)		LC-43/3, Plesetsk	Successful	Kosmos 2005 (Yantar-4K2)	
16 March 1989, 14:59	Soyuz-U (11A511U)		LC-16/2, Plesetsk	Successful	Kosmos 2006 (Zenit-8)	
16 March 1989, 18:54	Soyuz-U2 (11A511U2)		LC-1/5, Baikonur	Successful	Progress 41	Mir Logistics
23 March 1989, 12:25	Soyuz-U (11A511U)		LC-1/5, Baikonur	Successful	Kosmos 2007 (Yantar-4KS1)	
6 April 1989, 14:00	Soyuz-U (11A511U)		LC-43/3, Plesetsk	Successful	Kosmos 2017 (Zenit-8)	
20 April 1989, 18:29	Soyuz-U (11A511U)		LC-43/3, Plesetsk	Successful	Kosmos 2018 (Yantar-4K2)	
26 April 1989, 17:00	Soyuz-U (11A511U)		LC-41/1, Plesetsk	Successful	Foton 2	
5 May 1989, 13:00	Soyuz-U (11A511U)		LC-16/2, Plesetsk	Successful	Kosmos 2019 (Zenit-8)	
17 May 1989, 13:00	Soyuz-U (11A511U)		LC-1/5, Baikonur	Successful	Kosmos 2020 (Yantar-4K2)	
24 May 1989, 10:30	Soyuz-U (11A511U)		LC-1/5, Baikonur	Successful	Kosmos 2021 (Yantar-1KFT)	
25 May 1989, 10:30	Soyuz-U (11A511U)		LC-43/3, Plesetsk	Successful	Resurs F-1	
1 June 1989, 12:59	Soyuz-U (11A511U)		LC-43/4, Plesetsk	Successful	Kosmos 2025 (Zenit-8)	
8 June 1989, 17:09	Molniya-M (8K78M)		LC-43/3, Plesetsk	Successful	Molniya 3-45L	
16 June 1989, 09:30	Soyuz-U (11A511U)		LC-1/5, Baikonur	Successful	Kosmos 2028 (Zenit-8)	
27 June 1989, 08:05	Soyuz-U (11A511U)		LC-16/2, Plesetsk	Successful	Resurs F-2	
5 July 1989, 08:00	Soyuz-U (11A511U)		LC-43/4, Plesetsk	Successful	Kosmos 2029 (Zenit-8)	
12 July 1989, 15:00	Soyuz-U (11A511U)		LC-41/1, Plesetsk	Successful	Kosmos 2030 (Yantar-4K2)	
18 July 1989, 09:45	Soyuz-U (11A511U)		LC-16/2, Plesetsk	Successful	Resurs F-3	
18 July 1989, 12:10	Soyuz-U (11A511U)		LC-1/5, Baikonur	Successful	Kosmos 2031 (Don)	
20 July 1989, 08:59	Soyuz-U (11A511U)		LC-43/3, Plesetsk	Successful	Kosmos 2032 (Zenit-8)	
2 August 1989, 11:29	Soyuz-U (11A511U)		LC-16/2, Plesetsk	Successful	Kosmos 2035 (Zenit-8)	
15 August 1989, 10:30	Soyuz-U (11A511U)		LC-43/4, Plesetsk	Successful	Resurs F-4	
22 August 1989, 12:59	Soyuz-U (11A511U)		LC-41/1, Plesetsk	Successful	Kosmos 2036 (Zenit-8)	
23 August 1989, 03:09	Soyuz-U2 (11A511U2)		LC-1/5, Baikonur	Successful	Progress M-1	Mir Logistics
5 September 1989, 21:38	Soyuz-U2 (11A511U2)		LC-1/5, Baikonur	Successful	Soyuz TM-8	Crewed orbital flight, 2 cosmonauts Docked with Mir
6 September 1989, 10:50	Soyuz-U (11A511U)		LC-43/3, Plesetsk	Successful	Resurs F-5	
15 September 1989, 06:30	Soyuz-U (11A511U)		LC-41/1, Plesetsk	Successful	Kosmos 2044 (Bion)	
22 September 1989, 08:00	Soyuz-U (11A511U)		LC-1/5, Baikonur	Successful	Kosmos 2045 (Zenit-8)	
27 September 1989, 14:38	Molniya-M (8K78M)		LC-43/4, Plesetsk	Successful	Molniya 1-76	
3 October 1989, 14:59	Soyuz-U (11A511U)		LC-43/3, Plesetsk	Successful	Kosmos 2047 (Yantar-4K2)	
17 October 1989, 13:00	Soyuz-U (11A511U)		LC-43/4, Plesetsk	Successful	Kosmos 2048 (Zenit-8)	
17 November 1989, 10:50	Soyuz-U (11A511U)		LC-1/5, Baikonur	Successful	Kosmos 2049 (Yantar-4KS1)	
23 November 1989, 20:35	Molniya-M (8K78M)		LC-16/2, Plesetsk	Successful	Kosmos 2050 (Oko)	
28 November 1989, 10:02	Molniya-M (8K78M)		LC-43/3, Plesetsk	Successful	Molniya 3-46L	
30 November 1989, 15:00	Soyuz-U (11A511U)		LC-16/2, Plesetsk	Successful	Kosmos 2052 (Yantar-4K2)	
20 December 1989, 03:30	Soyuz-U2 (11A511U2)		LC-1/5, Baikonur	Successful	Progress M-2	Mir Logistics
