= Kosmos 1793 =

Soviet military early warning satellite

- Mission type: Early warning
- COSPAR ID: 1986-091A
- SATCAT no.: 17134
- Mission duration: 4 years

Spacecraft properties
- Spacecraft type: US-K
- Launch mass: 1,900 kilograms (4,200 lb)

Start of mission
- Launch date: 20 November 1986, 12:09 UTC
- Rocket: Molniya-M/2BL
- Launch site: Plesetsk Cosmodrome

End of mission
- Decay date: 15 May 2011

Orbital parameters
- Reference system: Geocentric
- Regime: Molniya
- Perigee altitude: 639 kilometres (397 mi)
- Apogee altitude: 39,717 kilometres (24,679 mi)
- Inclination: 62.9 degrees
- Period: 717.80 minutes

Kosmos 1793 (Russian: Космос 1793 meaning Cosmos 1793) is a Soviet US-K missile early warning satellite which was launched in 1986 as part of the Soviet military's Oko programme. The satellite is designed to identify missile launches using optical telescopes and infrared sensors.

Kosmos 1793 was launched from Site 16/2 at Plesetsk Cosmodrome in the Russian SSR. A Molniya-M carrier rocket with a 2BL upper stage was used to perform the launch, which took place at 12:09 UTC on 20 November 1986. The launch successfully placed the satellite into a molniya orbit. It subsequently received its Kosmos designation, and the international designator 1986-091A. The United States Space Command assigned it the Satellite Catalog Number 17134.

It re-entered the Earth's atmosphere on 15 May 2011.

== See also ==
- List of Kosmos satellites (1751–2000)
- List of R-7 launches (1985–1989)
- 1986 in spaceflight
- List of Oko satellites
