= List of Kosmos satellites (1751–2000) =

The designation Kosmos (Russian: Космос meaning Cosmos) is a generic name given to a large number of Soviet, and subsequently Russian, satellites, the first of which was launched in 1962. Satellites given Kosmos designations include military spacecraft, failed probes to the Moon and the planets, prototypes for crewed spacecraft, and scientific spacecraft. This is a list of satellites with Kosmos designations between 1751 and 2000.

Designation	Type	Launch date (GMT)	Carrier rocket	Function	Decay/Destruction*	Remarks
Kosmos 1751	Strela-1M	6 June 1986; 03:57	Kosmos-3M 11K65M	Communication	in orbit	Launched with Kosmos 1748-1750
Kosmos 1752	Strela-1M	6 June 1986; 03:57	Kosmos-3M 11K65M	Communication	in orbit	Launched with Kosmos 1748-1750
Kosmos 1753	Strela-1M	6 June 1986; 03:57	Kosmos-3M 11K65M	Communication	in orbit	Launched with Kosmos 1748-1750
Kosmos 1754	Strela-1M	6 June 1986; 03:57	Kosmos-3M 11K65M	Communication	in orbit	Launched with Kosmos 1748-1750
Kosmos 1755	Strela-1M	6 June 1986; 03:57	Kosmos-3M 11K65M	Communication	in orbit	Launched with Kosmos 1748-1750
Kosmos 1756	Yantar-4K2	6 June 1986; 12:40	Soyuz-U 11A511U	Reconnaissance	4 August 1986	
Kosmos 1757	Zenit-8	11 June 1986; 07:45	Soyuz-U 11A511U	Reconnaissance	25 June 1986	
Kosmos 1758	Tselina-D	12 June 1986; 04:43	Tsyklon-3 11K68	ELINT	in orbit	
Kosmos 1759	Parus	18 June 1986; 20:03	Kosmos-3M 11K65M	Navigation, Communication	in orbit	
Kosmos 1760	Zenit-8	19 June 1986; 10:30	Soyuz-U 11A511U	Reconnaissance	3 July 1986	
Kosmos 1761	US-K	5 July 1986; 01:16	Molniya-M 8K78M	Missile defence	in orbit	
Kosmos 1762	Resurs-F1	10 July 1986; 08:00	Soyuz-U 11A511U	Remote sensing	24 July 1986	
Kosmos 1763	Strela-2	16 July 1986; 04:21	Kosmos-3M 11K65M	Communication	in orbit	
Kosmos 1764	Yantar-4K2	17 July 1986; 12:30	Soyuz-U 11A511U	Reconnaissance	11 September 1986	
Kosmos 1765	Zenit-8	24 July 1986; 12:30	Soyuz-U 11A511U	Reconnaissance	7 August 1986	
Kosmos 1766	Okean-O1	28 July 1986; 21:08	Tsyklon-3 11K68	Improved Oceanographic satellite technology of the type on Kosmos 1500.	in orbit	Plesetsk launch. Orbit 635 x 666 km. Inclination 82.5 degrees. Weight-possibly 2500 kg.
Kosmos 1767	Tselina-2	30 July 1986; 08:30	Zenit-2 11K77	ELINT	16 August 1986	
Kosmos 1768	Resurs-F1	2 August 1986; 09:20	Soyuz-U 11A511U	Remote sensing	16 August 1986	
Kosmos 1769	US-PM	4 August 1986; 05:08	Tsyklon-2 11K69	Reconnaissance	18 February 1988	
Kosmos 1770	Yantar-4KS1	6 August 1986; 13:30	Soyuz-U 11A511U	Reconnaissance	2 February 1987	
Kosmos 1771	US-A	20 August 1986; 12:58	Tsyklon-2 11K69	Reconnaissance	29 November 1986	
Kosmos 1772	Zenit-8	21 August 1986; 11:04	Soyuz-U 11A511U	Reconnaissance	3 September 1986	
Kosmos 1773	Yantar-4K2	27 August 1986; 11:40	Soyuz-U 11A511U	Reconnaissance	21 October 1986	
Kosmos 1774	US-K	28 August 1986; 08:02	Molniya-M 8K78M	Missile defence	2 November 2010	
Kosmos 1775	Zenit-8	3 September 1986; 07:59	Soyuz-U 11A511U	Reconnaissance	17 September 1986	
Kosmos 1776	Romb	3 September 1986; 09:00	Kosmos-3M 11K65M	Calibration	15 December 1989	
Kosmos 1777	Strela-2	10 September 1986; 01:45	Kosmos-3M 11K65M	Communication	in orbit	
Kosmos 1778	Glonass	16 September 1986; 11:38	Proton-K/DM-2 8K72K	Eighth flight of GLONASS (Global Navigation Satellite System) program.	in orbit	Baikonur launch. Orbit 19105 x 19155 km. Inclination 64.8 degrees. First flight with all 3 payloads active.
Kosmos 1779	Glonass	16 September 1986; 11:38	Proton-K/DM-2 8K72K	Eighth flight of GLONASS (Global Navigation Satellite System) program.	in orbit	Baikonur launch. Orbit 19105 x 19155 km. Inclination 64.8 degrees. First flight with all 3 payloads active.
Kosmos 1780	Glonass	16 September 1986; 11:38	Proton-K/DM-2 8K72K	Eighth flight of GLONASS (Global Navigation Satellite System) program.	in orbit	Baikonur launch. Orbit 19105 x 19155 km. Inclination 64.8 degrees. First flight with all 3 payloads active.
Kosmos 1781	Zenit-8	17 September 1986; 07:59	Soyuz-U 11A511U	Reconnaissance	1 October 1986	
Kosmos 1782	Tselina-D	30 September 1986; 18:34	Tsyklon-3 11K68	ELINT	in orbit	
Kosmos 1783	US-K	3 October 1986; 13:05	Molniya-M 8K78M	Missile defense. Early Warning Satellite.	in orbit	Plesetsk launch. Orbit 597 x 20,057 km. Inclination 62.8 degrees. Weight-possibly 2 tonnes. C-Stage of rocket shut down early. 12 Days later another Early Warning Satellite launched (Kosmos 1785).
Kosmos 1784	Yantar-1KFT	6 October 1986; 07:40	Soyuz-U 11A511U	Reconnaissance	11 November 1986	
Kosmos 1785	US-K	15 October 1986; 09:29	Molniya-M 8K78M	Missile defense. Early Warning Satellite.	28 February 2002	
Kosmos 1786	Taifun-1B	22 October 1986; 08:00	Zenit-2 11K77	Radar target	6 March 1988	
Kosmos 1787	Zenit-8	22 October 1986; 09:00	Soyuz-U 11A511U	Reconnaissance	4 November 1986	
Kosmos 1788	Taifun-1	27 October 1986; 12:40	Kosmos-3M 11K65M	Radar target	21 January 1991	
Kosmos 1789	Resurs-F1	31 October 1986; 08:00	Soyuz-U 11A511U	Remote sensing	14 November 1986	
Kosmos 1790	Zenit-8	4 November 1986; 11:50	Soyuz-U 11A511U	Reconnaissance	18 November 1986	
Kosmos 1791	Tsikada	13 November 1986; 06:10	Kosmos-3M 11K65M	Navigation	in orbit	
Kosmos 1792	Yantar-4K2	13 November 1986; 10:59	Soyuz-U 11A511U	Reconnaissance	5 January 1987	
Kosmos 1793	US-K	20 November 1986; 12:09	Molniya-M 8K78M	Missile defence	in orbit	
Kosmos 1794	Strela-1M	21 November 1986; 02:00	Kosmos-3M 11K65M	Communication	in orbit	
Kosmos 1795	Strela-1M	21 November 1986; 02:00	Kosmos-3M 11K65M	Communication	in orbit	
Kosmos 1796	Strela-1M	21 November 1986; 02:00	Kosmos-3M 11K65M	Communication	in orbit	
Kosmos 1797	Strela-1M	21 November 1986; 02:00	Kosmos-3M 11K65M	Communication	in orbit	
Kosmos 1798	Strela-1M	21 November 1986; 02:00	Kosmos-3M 11K65M	Communication	in orbit	
Kosmos 1799	Strela-1M	21 November 1986; 02:00	Kosmos-3M 11K65M	Communication	in orbit	
Kosmos 1800	Strela-1M	21 November 1986; 02:00	Kosmos-3M 11K65M	Communication	in orbit	
Kosmos 1801	Strela-1M	21 November 1986; 02:00	Kosmos-3M 11K65M	Communication	in orbit	
Kosmos 1802	Parus	24 November 1986; 21:43	Kosmos-3M 11K65M	Navigation, Communication	in orbit	
Kosmos 1803	Geo-IK	2 December 1986; 07:00	Tsyklon-3 11K68	Geodesy	in orbit	Seventh satellite of the upgraded second series of Soviet geodetic satellites. Carried out studies of the shape of the Earth and accurately mapped the Earth's surface to enable accurate targeting of military missiles.
Kosmos 1804	Zenit-8	4 December 1986; 10:10	Soyuz-U 11A511U	Reconnaissance	18 December 1986	
Kosmos 1805	Tselina-R	10 December 1986; 07:30	Tsyklon-3 11K68	ELINT	in orbit	
Kosmos 1806	US-K	12 December 1986; 18:35	Molniya-M 8K78M	Missile defence	in orbit	
Kosmos 1807	Yantar-4K2	16 December 1986; 14:00	Soyuz-U 11A511U	Reconnaissance	23 January 1987	
Kosmos 1808	Parus	17 December 1986; 17:02	Kosmos-3M 11K65M	Navigation, Communication	in orbit	
Kosmos 1809	AUOS-Z-I-E	18 December 1986; 08:00	Tsyklon-3 11K68	Ionospheric	in orbit	
Kosmos 1810	Yantar-4KS1	26 December 1986; 11:00	Soyuz-U 11A511U	Reconnaissance	11 September 1987	
Kosmos 1811	Yantar-4K2	9 January 1987; 12:38	Soyuz-U 11A511U	Reconnaissance	13 February 1987	
Kosmos 1812	Tselina-D	14 January 1987; 09:05	Tsyklon-3 11K68	ELINT	in orbit	
Kosmos 1813	Zenit-8	15 January 1987; 11:20	Soyuz-U 11A511U	Reconnaissance	13 March 1989	
Kosmos 1814	Strela-2	21 January 1987; 09:10	Kosmos-3M 11K65M	Communication	in orbit	
Kosmos 1815	Romb	22 January 1987; 07:00	Kosmos-3M 11K65M	Calibration	15 November 1988	
Kosmos 1816	Tsikada	29 January 1987; 06:14	Kosmos-3M 11K65M	Navigation	in orbit	
Kosmos 1817	Ekran-M	30 January 1987; 09:19	Proton-K/DM-2 8K72K	Communication	18 March 1987	
Kosmos 1818	Plazma-A	1 February 1987; 23:30	Tsyklon-2 11K69	Technology	in orbit	
Kosmos 1819	Zenit-8	7 February 1987; 10:30	Soyuz-U 11A511U	Reconnaissance	18 February 1987	
Kosmos 1820	Tselina-2	14 February 1987; 08:30	Zenit-2 11K77	ELINT	6 March 1987	
Kosmos 1821	Parus	18 February 1987; 13:53	Kosmos-3M 11K65M	Navigation, Communication	in orbit	
Kosmos 1822	Zenit-8	19 February 1987; 10:15	Soyuz-U 11A511U	Reconnaissance	5 March 1987	
Kosmos 1823	Geo-IK	20 February 1987; 04:43	Tsyklon-3 11K68	Geodesy	in orbit	Disintegrated in orbit due to a failure of an NiH2 battery.
Kosmos 1824	Yantar-4K2	26 February 1987; 13:30	Soyuz-U 11A511U	Reconnaissance	22 April 1987	
Kosmos 1825	Tselina-D	3 March 1987; 15:03	Tsyklon-3 11K68	ELINT	in orbit	
Kosmos 1826	Zenit-8	11 March 1987; 10:25	Soyuz-U 11A511U	Reconnaissance	25 March 1987	
Kosmos 1827	Strela-3	13 March 1987; 13:11	Tsyklon-3 11K68	Communication	in orbit	
Kosmos 1828	Strela-3	13 March 1987; 13:11	Tsyklon-3 11K68	Communication	in orbit	
Kosmos 1829	Strela-3	13 March 1987; 13:11	Tsyklon-3 11K68	Communication	in orbit	
Kosmos 1830	Strela-3	13 March 1987; 13:11	Tsyklon-3 11K68	Communication	in orbit	
Kosmos 1831	Strela-3	13 March 1987; 13:11	Tsyklon-3 11K68	Communication	in orbit	
Kosmos 1832	Strela-3	13 March 1987; 13:11	Tsyklon-3 11K68	Communication	in orbit	
Kosmos 1833	Tselina-2	18 March 1987; 08:30	Zenit-2 11K77	ELINT	in orbit	
Kosmos 1834	US-PM	8 April 1987; 03:51	Tsyklon-2 11K69	Reconnaissance	14 October 1988	
Kosmos 1835	Yantar-4K2	9 April 1987; 11:44	Soyuz-U 11A511U	Reconnaissance	4 June 1987	
Kosmos 1836	Yantar-4KS1	16 April 1987; 06:18	Soyuz-U 11A511U	Reconnaissance	2 December 1987	
Kosmos 1837	Zenit-8	22 April 1987; 09:10	Soyuz-U 11A511U	Reconnaissance	28 April 1987	
Kosmos 1838	Glonass	24 April 1987; 12:42	Proton-K/DM-2 8K72K	Navigation	15 May 1991	Launch failure due to upper stage malfunction resulting in unusably low orbit
Kosmos 1839	Glonass	24 April 1987; 12:42	Proton-K/DM-2 8K72K	Navigation	8 May 1991	Launch failure due to upper stage malfunction resulting in unusably low orbit
Kosmos 1840	Glonass	24 April 1987; 12:42	Proton-K/DM-2 8K72K	Navigation	14 September 1991	Launch failure due to upper stage malfunction resulting in unusably low orbit
Kosmos 1841	Foton	24 April 1987; 16:59	Soyuz-U 11A511U	Materials	8 May 1987	
Kosmos 1842	Tselina-D	27 April 1987; 00:00	Tsyklon-3 11K68	ELINT	in orbit	
Kosmos 1843	Zenit-8	5 May 1987; 09:15	Soyuz-U 11A511U	Reconnaissance	19 May 1987	
Kosmos 1844	Tselina-2	13 May 1987; 05:40	Zenit-2 11K77	ELINT	in orbit	
Kosmos 1845	Zenit-8	13 May 1987; 06:00	Soyuz-U 11A511U	Reconnaissance	27 May 1987	
Kosmos 1846	Resurs-F1	21 May 1987; 07:44	Soyuz-U 11A511U	Remote sensing	4 June 1987	
Kosmos 1847	Yantar-4K2	26 May 1987; 13:39	Soyuz-U 11A511U	Reconnaissance	22 July 1987	
Kosmos 1848	Zenit-8	28 May 1987; 12:44	Soyuz-U 11A511U	Reconnaissance	11 June 1987	
Kosmos 1849	US-K	4 June 1987; 18:50	Molniya-M 8K78M	Missile defence	3 February 2003	
Kosmos 1850	Strela-2	9 June 1987; 14:45	Kosmos-3M 11K65M	Communication	in orbit	
Kosmos 1851	US-K	12 June 1987; 07:40	Molniya-M 8K78M	Missile defence	in orbit	
Kosmos 1852	Strela-1M	16 June 1987; 17:51	Kosmos-3M 11K65M	Communication	in orbit	
Kosmos 1853	Strela-1M	16 June 1987; 17:51	Kosmos-3M 11K65M	Communication	in orbit	
Kosmos 1854	Strela-1M	16 June 1987; 17:51	Kosmos-3M 11K65M	Communication	in orbit	
Kosmos 1855	Strela-1M	16 June 1987; 17:51	Kosmos-3M 11K65M	Communication	in orbit	
Kosmos 1856	Strela-1M	16 June 1987; 17:51	Kosmos-3M 11K65M	Communication	in orbit	
Kosmos 1857	Strela-1M	16 June 1987; 17:51	Kosmos-3M 11K65M	Communication	in orbit	
Kosmos 1858	Strela-1M	16 June 1987; 17:51	Kosmos-3M 11K65M	Communication	in orbit	
Kosmos 1859	Strela-1M	16 June 1987; 17:51	Kosmos-3M 11K65M	Communication	in orbit	
Kosmos 1860	US-A	18 June 1987; 21:33	Tsyklon-2 11K69	Reconnaissance	16 September 1987	
Kosmos 1861	Tsikada	23 June 1987; 07:37	Kosmos-3M 11K65M	Navigation	in orbit	
Kosmos 1862	Tselina-D	1 July 1987; 19:35	Tsyklon-3 11K68	ELINT	in orbit	
Kosmos 1863	Zenit-8	4 July 1987; 12:25	Soyuz-U 11A511U	Reconnaissance	18 July 1987	
Kosmos 1864	Parus	6 July 1987; 21:59	Kosmos-3M 11K65M	Navigation, Communication	in orbit	
Kosmos 1865	Yantar-1KFT	8 July 1987; 10:59	Soyuz-U 11A511U	Reconnaissance	14 August 1987	
Kosmos 1866	Yantar-4K2	9 July 1987; 16:10	Soyuz-U 11A511U	Reconnaissance	6 November 1987	
Kosmos 1867	Plazma-A	10 July 1987; 15:35	Tsyklon-2 11K69	Technology	in orbit	
Kosmos 1868	Taifun-1B	14 July 1987; 14:00	Kosmos-3M 11K65M	Radar target	2 March 1989	
Kosmos 1869	Okean-O1	16 July 1987; 04:25	Tsyklon-3 11K68	Oceanography	in orbit	
Kosmos 1870	Almaz-T	25 July 1987; 09:00	Proton-K 8K72K	Reconnaissance	29 July 1989	
Kosmos 1871	Tselina-2	1 August 1987; 03:59	Zenit-2 11K77	ELINT	10 August 1987	
Kosmos 1872	Zenit-8	19 August 1987; 06:59	Soyuz-U 11A511U	Reconnaissance	30 August 1987	
Kosmos 1873	Tselina-2	28 August 1987; 08:20	Zenit-2 11K77	ELINT	14 September 1987	
Kosmos 1874	Zenit-8	3 September 1987; 10:25	Soyuz-U 11A511U	Reconnaissance	17 September 1987	
Kosmos 1875	Strela-3	7 September 1987; 23:50	Tsyklon-3 11K68	Communication	in orbit	
Kosmos 1876	Strela-3	7 September 1987; 23:50	Tsyklon-3 11K68	Communication	in orbit	
Kosmos 1877	Strela-3	7 September 1987; 23:50	Tsyklon-3 11K68	Communication	in orbit	
Kosmos 1878	Strela-3	7 September 1987; 23:50	Tsyklon-3 11K68	Communication	in orbit	
Kosmos 1879	Strela-3	7 September 1987; 23:50	Tsyklon-3 11K68	Communication	in orbit	
Kosmos 1880	Strela-3	7 September 1987; 23:50	Tsyklon-3 11K68	Communication	in orbit	
Kosmos 1881	Yantar-4KS1	11 September 1987; 02:06	Soyuz-U 11A511U	Reconnaissance	30 March 1988	
Kosmos 1882	Resurs-F1	15 September 1987; 10:30	Soyuz-U 11A511U	Remote sensing	6 October 1987	
Kosmos 1883	Glonass	16 September 1987; 02:53	Proton-K/DM-2 8K72K	Navigation	in orbit	
Kosmos 1884	Glonass	16 September 1987; 02:53	Proton-K/DM-2 8K72K	Navigation	in orbit	
Kosmos 1885	Glonass	16 September 1987; 02:53	Proton-K/DM-2 8K72K	Navigation	in orbit	
Kosmos 1886	Yantar-4K2	17 September 1987; 14:59	Soyuz-U 11A511U	Reconnaissance	2 November 1987	
Kosmos 1887	Bion	29 September 1987; 12:50	Soyuz-U 11A511U	Biological	12 October 1987	
Kosmos 1888	Potok	1 October 1987; 17:09	Proton-K/DM-2 8K72K	Communication	in orbit	
Kosmos 1889	Zenit-8	9 October 1987; 08:30	Soyuz-U 11A511U	Reconnaissance	23 October 1987	
Kosmos 1890	US-PM	10 October 1987; 21:48	Tsyklon-2 11K69	Reconnaissance	26 December 1988	
Kosmos 1891	Parus	14 October 1987; 12:35	Kosmos-3M 11K65M	Navigation, Communication	in orbit	
Kosmos 1892	Tselina-D	20 October 1987; 09:09	Tsyklon-3 11K68	ELINT	in orbit	
Kosmos 1893	Yantar-4K2	22 October 1987; 14:25	Soyuz-U 11A511U	Reconnaissance	16 December 1987	
Kosmos 1894	US-KS	28 October 1987; 15:15	Proton-K/DM-2 8K72K	Missile defence	in orbit	
Kosmos 1895	Zenit-8	11 November 1987; 09:04	Soyuz-U 11A511U	Reconnaissance	26 November 1987	
Kosmos 1896	Yantar-1KFT	14 November 1987; 09:29	Soyuz-U 11A511U	Reconnaissance	25 December 1987	
Kosmos 1897	Luch	26 November 1987; 13:28	Proton-K/DM-2 8K72K	Communication	in orbit	
Kosmos 1898	Strela-2	1 December 1987; 14:15	Kosmos-3M 11K65M	Communication	in orbit	
Kosmos 1899	Zenit-8	7 December 1987; 08:50	Soyuz-U 11A511U	Reconnaissance	21 December 1987	
Kosmos 1900	US-A	12 December 1987; 05:40	Tsyklon-2 11K69	Reconnaissance	in orbit	
Kosmos 1901	Yantar-4K2	14 December 1987; 11:29	Soyuz-U 11A511U	Reconnaissance	3 February 1988	
Kosmos 1902	Taifun-1	15 December 1987; 13:30	Kosmos-3M 11K65M	Radar target	30 December 1988	
Kosmos 1903	US-K	21 December 1987; 22:35	Molniya-M 8K78M	Missile defence	in orbit	
Kosmos 1904	Parus	23 December 1987; 20:22	Kosmos-3M 11K65M	Navigation, Communication	in orbit	
Kosmos 1905	Zenit-8	25 December 1987; 08:45	Soyuz-U 11A511U	Reconnaissance	8 January 1988	
Kosmos 1906	Resurs-F2	26 December 1987; 11:30	Soyuz-U 11A511U	Remote sensing	13 March 1988	
Kosmos 1907	Zenit-8	29 December 1987; 11:40	Soyuz-U 11A511U	Reconnaissance	12 January 1988	
Kosmos 1908	Tselina-D	6 January 1988; 07:41	Tsyklon-3 11K68	ELINT	8 April 2026	
Kosmos 1909	Strela-3	15 January 1988; 03:49	Tsyklon-3 11K68	Communication	in orbit	
Kosmos 1910	Strela-3	15 January 1988; 03:49	Tsyklon-3 11K68	Communication	in orbit	
Kosmos 1911	Strela-3	15 January 1988; 03:49	Tsyklon-3 11K68	Communication	in orbit	
Kosmos 1912	Strela-3	15 January 1988; 03:49	Tsyklon-3 11K68	Communication	in orbit	
Kosmos 1913	Strela-3	15 January 1988; 03:49	Tsyklon-3 11K68	Communication	in orbit	
Kosmos 1914	Strela-3	15 January 1988; 03:49	Tsyklon-3 11K68	Communication	in orbit	
Kosmos 1915	Zenit-8	26 January 1988; 11:20	Soyuz-U 11A511U	Reconnaissance	9 February 1988	
Kosmos 1916	Yantar-4K2	3 February 1988; 12:15	Soyuz-U 11A511U	Reconnaissance	29 February 1988	
Kosmos 1917	Glonass	17 February 1988; 00:23	Proton-K/DM-2 8K72K	Navigation	17 February 1988	
Kosmos 1918	Glonass	17 February 1988; 00:23	Proton-K/DM-2 8K72K	Navigation	17 February 1988	
Kosmos 1919	Glonass	17 February 1988; 00:23	Proton-K/DM-2 8K72K	Navigation	17 February 1988	
Kosmos 1920	Resurs-F1	18 February 1988; 09:50	Soyuz-U 11A511U	Remote sensing	9 March 1988	
Kosmos 1921	Zenit-8	19 February 1988; 08:00	Soyuz-U 11A511U	Reconnaissance	4 March 1988	
Kosmos 1922	US-K	26 February 1988; 09:31	Molniya-M 8K78M	Missile defence	in orbit	
Kosmos 1923	Zenit-8	10 March 1988; 10:30	Soyuz-U 11A511U	Reconnaissance	22 March 1988	
Kosmos 1924	Strela-1M	11 March 1988; 00:18	Kosmos-3M 11K65M	Communication	in orbit	
Kosmos 1925	Strela-1M	11 March 1988; 00:18	Kosmos-3M 11K65M	Communication	in orbit	
Kosmos 1926	Strela-1M	11 March 1988; 00:18	Kosmos-3M 11K65M	Communication	in orbit	
Kosmos 1927	Strela-1M	11 March 1988; 00:18	Kosmos-3M 11K65M	Communication	in orbit	
Kosmos 1928	Strela-1M	11 March 1988; 00:18	Kosmos-3M 11K65M	Communication	in orbit	
Kosmos 1929	Strela-1M	11 March 1988; 00:18	Kosmos-3M 11K65M	Communication	in orbit	
Kosmos 1930	Strela-1M	11 March 1988; 00:18	Kosmos-3M 11K65M	Communication	in orbit	
Kosmos 1931	Strela-1M	11 March 1988; 00:18	Kosmos-3M 11K65M	Communication	in orbit	
Kosmos 1932	US-A	14 March 1988; 14:21	Tsyklon-2 11K69	Reconnaissance	29 June 1988	Malfunctioned
Kosmos 1933	Tselina-D	15 March 1988; 18:50	Tsyklon-3 11K68	ELINT	in orbit	
Kosmos 1934	Parus	22 March 1988; 14:07	Kosmos-3M 11K65M	Navigation, Communication	in orbit	First satellite to be involved in an accidental collision between cataloged objects. On 23 Dec 1991 it collided with Mission-related debris (1977-062C, 13475).
Kosmos 1935	Yantar-4K2	24 March 1988; 14:10	Soyuz-U 11A511U	Reconnaissance	8 April 1988	
Kosmos 1936	Yantar-4KS1	30 March 1988; 12:00	Soyuz-U 11A511U	Reconnaissance	18 May 1988	
Kosmos 1937	Strela-2	5 April 1988; 14:41	Kosmos-3M 11K65M	Communication	in orbit	
Kosmos 1938	Zenit-8	11 April 1988; 11:15	Soyuz-U 11A511U	Reconnaissance	25 April 1988	
Kosmos 1939	Resurs-O1	20 April 1988; 05:48	Vostok-2M 8A92M	Remote sensing	29 October 2014	
Kosmos 1940	Geofizika	26 April 1988; 03:15	Proton-K/DM-2 8K72K	Nuclear detection	in orbit	
Kosmos 1941	Zenit-8	27 April 1988; 09:10	Soyuz-U 11A511U	Reconnaissance	11 May 1988	
Kosmos 1942	Yantar-4K2	12 May 1988; 14:40	Soyuz-U 11A511U	Reconnaissance	4 July 1988	
Kosmos 1943	Tselina-2	15 May 1988; 09:20	Zenit-2 11K77	ELINT	in orbit	
Kosmos 1944	Yantar-1KFT	18 May 1988; 10:30	Soyuz-U 11A511U	Reconnaissance	23 June 1988	
Kosmos 1945	Zenit-8	19 May 1988; 09:15	Soyuz-U 11A511U	Reconnaissance	31 May 1988	
Kosmos 1946	Glonass	21 May 1988; 17:57	Proton-K/DM-2 8K72K	Navigation	in orbit	
Kosmos 1947	Glonass	21 May 1988; 17:57	Proton-K/DM-2 8K72K	Navigation	in orbit	
Kosmos 1948	Glonass	21 May 1988; 17:57	Proton-K/DM-2 8K72K	Navigation	in orbit	
Kosmos 1949	US-PM	28 May 1988; 02:49	Tsyklon-2 11K69	Reconnaissance	23 April 1990	
Kosmos 1950	Geo-IK	30 May 1988; 08:00	Tsyklon-3 11K68	Geodesy	in orbit	
Kosmos 1951	Resurs-F1	31 May 1988; 07:45	Soyuz-U 11A511U	Remote sensing	14 June 1988	
Kosmos 1952	Zenit-8	11 June 1988; 10:00	Soyuz-U 11A511U	Reconnaissance	25 June 1988	
Kosmos 1953	Tselina-D	14 June 1988; 03:18	Tsyklon-3 11K68	ELINT	in orbit	
Kosmos 1954	Strela-2	21 June 1988; 16:26	Kosmos-3M 11K65M	Communication	in orbit	
Kosmos 1955	Yantar-4K2	22 June 1988; 13:00	Soyuz-U 11A511U	Reconnaissance	20 August 1988	
Kosmos 1956	Zenit-8	23 June 1988; 07:45	Soyuz-U 11A511U	Reconnaissance	7 July 1988	
Kosmos 1957	Resurs-F1	7 July 1988; 08:05	Soyuz-U 11A511U	Remote sensing	21 July 1988	
Kosmos 1958	Taifun-1	14 July 1988; 11:40	Kosmos-3M 11K65M	Radar target	21 March 1989	
Kosmos 1959	Parus	18 July 1988; 22:28	Kosmos-3M 11K65M	Navigation, Communication	in orbit	
Kosmos 1960	Romb	28 July 1988; 11:20	Kosmos-3M 11K65M	Calibration	9 April 1990	
Kosmos 1961	Potok	1 August 1988; 21:04	Proton-K/DM-2 8K72K	Communication	in orbit	
Kosmos 1962	Zenit-8	8 August 1988; 09:25	Soyuz-U 11A511U	Reconnaissance	22 August 1988	
Kosmos 1963	Yantar-4K2	16 August 1988; 13:00	Soyuz-U 11A511U	Reconnaissance	2 October 1988	
Kosmos 1964	Zenit-8	23 August 1988; 09:20	Soyuz-U 11A511U	Reconnaissance	7 September 1988	
Kosmos 1965	Resurs-F2	23 August 1988; 11:15	Soyuz-U 11A511U	Remote sensing	22 September 1988	
Kosmos 1966	US-K	30 August 1988; 14:14	Molniya-M 8K78M	Missile defence	10 November 2005	
Kosmos 1967	Zenit-8	6 September 1988; 07:30	Soyuz-U 11A511U	Reconnaissance	15 September 1988	
Kosmos 1968	Resurs-F1	9 September 1988; 10:40	Soyuz-U 11A511U	Remote sensing	23 September 1988	
Kosmos 1969	Yantar-4K2	15 September 1988; 15:00	Soyuz-U 11A511U	Reconnaissance	13 November 1988	
Kosmos 1970	Glonass	16 September 1988; 02:00	Proton-K/DM-2 8K72K	Navigation	in orbit	
Kosmos 1971	Glonass	16 September 1988; 02:00	Proton-K/DM-2 8K72K	Navigation	in orbit	
Kosmos 1972	Glonass	16 September 1988; 02:00	Proton-K/DM-2 8K72K	Navigation	in orbit	
Kosmos 1973	Zenit-8	22 September 1988; 10:20	Soyuz-U 11A511U	Reconnaissance	10 October 1988	
Kosmos 1974	US-K	3 October 1988; 22:23	Molniya-M 8K78M	Missile defence	in orbit	
Kosmos 1975	Tselina-D	11 October 1988; 08:01	Tsyklon-3 11K68	ELINT	in orbit	
Kosmos 1976	Zenit-8	13 October 1988; 11:19	Soyuz-U 11A511U	Reconnaissance	27 October 1988	
Kosmos 1977	US-K	25 October 1988; 18:02	Molniya-M 8K78M	Missile defence	in orbit	
Kosmos 1978	Zenit-8	27 October 1988; 11:31	Soyuz-U 11A511U	Reconnaissance	10 November 1988	
Kosmos 1979	US-PM	18 November 1988; 00:12	Tsyklon-2 11K69	Reconnaissance	25 December 1989	
Kosmos 1980	Tselina-2	23 November 1988; 14:50	Zenit-2 11K77	ELINT	in orbit	
Kosmos 1981	Zenit-8	24 November 1988; 14:50	Soyuz-U 11A511U	Reconnaissance	8 December 1988	
Kosmos 1982	Zenit-8	30 November 1988; 09:00	Soyuz-U 11A511U	Reconnaissance	14 December 1988	
Kosmos 1983	Zenit-8	8 December 1988; 14:50	Soyuz-U 11A511U	Reconnaissance	22 December 1988	
Kosmos 1984	Yantar-4K2	16 December 1988; 19:00	Soyuz-U 11A511U	Reconnaissance	13 February 1989	
Kosmos 1985	Kol'tso	23 December 1988; 07:20	Tsyklon-3 11K68	Calibration	17 March 1989	
Kosmos 1986	Yantar-1KFT	29 December 1988; 10:00	Soyuz-U 11A511U	Reconnaissance	11 February 1989	
Kosmos 1987	Glonass	10 January 1989; 02:05	Proton-K/DM-2 8K72K	Navigation	in orbit	
Kosmos 1988	Glonass	10 January 1989; 02:05	Proton-K/DM-2 8K72K	Navigation	in orbit	
Kosmos 1989	Etalon	10 January 1989; 02:05	Proton-K/DM-2 8K72K	Geodesy	in orbit	
Kosmos 1990	Resurs-F2	12 January 1989; 11:29	Soyuz-U 11A511U	Remote sensing	11 February 1989	
Kosmos 1991	Zenit-8	18 January 1989; 08:20	Soyuz-U 11A511U	Reconnaissance	1 February 1989	
Kosmos 1992	Strela-2	26 January 1989; 15:36	Kosmos-3M 11K65M	Communication	in orbit	
Kosmos 1993	Yantar-4K2	28 January 1989; 12:30	Soyuz-U 11A511U	Reconnaissance	27 March 1989	
Kosmos 1994	Strela-3	10 February 1989; 15:13	Tsyklon-3 11K68	Communication	in orbit	
Kosmos 1995	Strela-3	10 February 1989; 15:13	Tsyklon-3 11K68	Communication	in orbit	
Kosmos 1996	Strela-3	10 February 1989; 15:13	Tsyklon-3 11K68	Communication	in orbit	
Kosmos 1997	Strela-3	10 February 1989; 15:13	Tsyklon-3 11K68	Communication	in orbit	
Kosmos 1998	Strela-3	10 February 1989; 15:13	Tsyklon-3 11K68	Communication	in orbit	
Kosmos 1999	Strela-3	10 February 1989; 15:13	Tsyklon-3 11K68	Communication	in orbit	
Kosmos 2000	Zenit-8	10 February 1989; 16:55	Soyuz-U 11A511U	Reconnaissance	3 March 1989	

* — satellite was destroyed in orbit rather than decaying and burning up in the Earth's atmosphere

== See also ==
- List of USA satellites
