= 2BL =

2BL may refer to:

- 2BL, call sign for Australian radio station ABC Radio Sydney
- Block 2BL, a Russian rocket stage
