= Kosmos 1805 =

Soviet intelligence satellite

Kosmos 1805 (Russian: Космос 1805 meaning Cosmos 1805) was a Soviet electronic intelligence satellite which was launched in 1986. The first of four Tselina-R satellites to fly, it was constructed by Yuzhnoye with its ELINT payload manufactured by TsNII-108 GKRE. Since it ceased operations it has remained in orbit as space junk, and in April 2012 NASA's Fermi Gamma-ray Space Telescope was forced to maneuver to avoid a collision with the derelict satellite.

== Overview ==
Kosmos 1805 was launched at 07:30 UTC on December 10, 1986, atop a Tsyklon-3 rocket flying from Site 32/2 at the Plesetsk Cosmodrome. Following its successful launch, the satellite was given its Kosmos designation, along with international designator 1986-097A, and Satellite Catalog Number 17191. By 9 January 1987, the satellite was in an orbit with a perigee of 634 kilometres (394 mi), an apogee of 662 kilometres (411 mi), 82.5 degrees of inclination, and an orbital period of 97.68 minutes.

== Near-collision with Fermi Space Observatory ==
On April 30, 2013, it was announced that Fermi space observatory narrowly avoided a collision with Kosmos 1805 one year previous, in April 2012. Orbital predictions several days earlier indicated that the two satellites were expected to occupy the same point in space within 30 milliseconds of each other. On April 3, 2012, telescope operators decided to stow the satellite's high-gain parabolic antenna, rotate the solar panels out of the way and fire Fermi's rocket thrusters for one second to move it out of the way. Even though the thrusters had been idle since the telescope had been placed in orbit nearly five years earlier, they worked correctly. After the danger passed, Fermi initiated a one-second thruster burn to return to position.

== See also ==
- 1986 in spaceflight
- List of Kosmos satellites (1751–2000)
