= Kosmos 1792 =

1986 Soviet reconnaissance satellite

- Mission type: Reconnaissance (Film Photography)
- COSPAR ID: 1986-087A
- SATCAT no.: 17068
- Mission duration: 2 months

Spacecraft properties
- Spacecraft type: Yantar-4K2
- Launch mass: 7,000 kilograms (15,000 lb)

Start of mission
- Launch date: 13 November 1986, 10:59 UTC
- Rocket: Soyuz-U
- Launch site: Baikonur

End of mission
- Disposal: Recovered
- Landing date: 5 January 1987

Orbital parameters
- Reference system: Geocentric
- Regime: Low Earth
- Perigee altitude: 168 kilometres (104 mi)
- Apogee altitude: 309 kilometres (192 mi)
- Inclination: 64.9 degrees
- Period: 89.27 minutes
- Epoch: 20 November 1986

Kosmos 1792 was a Soviet reconnaissance satellite which was launched in 1986. A Yantar-4K2 satellite, it operated for almost two months before being deorbited and recovered.

Launched at 10:59 UTC on November 13, 1986 using a Soyuz-U rocket flying from the Baikonur Cosmodrome, Kosmos 1792 was operated in low Earth orbit until it was recovered on January 5, 1987. In addition to the main spacecraft, two separable film capsules were also returned during the satellite's mission. The satellite had a mass of approximately 7,000 kilograms (15,000 lb).

In November 1987, other spacecraft that launched that month besides Kosmos 1792 included Kosmos 1790, Kosmos 1791, Molinya 1-68, Gorizont No.22L, Kosmos 1793, eight Strela-1M satellites designated Kosmos 1794 to 1801, Kosmos 1802 and Mech-K No.303 - which failed to achieve orbit.

== See also ==
- 1986 in spaceflight
- List of Kosmos satellites (1751–2000)
- Yantar (satellite)
