= Kosmos 1894 =

Soviet military early warning satellite

- Mission type: Early warning
- Operator: VKS
- COSPAR ID: 1987-091A
- SATCAT no.: 18443
- Mission duration: 2 years

Spacecraft properties
- Spacecraft type: US-KS (74Kh6)
- Manufacturer: Lavochkin
- Launch mass: 2,400 kilograms (5,300 lb)

Start of mission
- Launch date: 28 October 1987, 15:15:00 UTC
- Rocket: Proton-K/DM-2
- Launch site: Baikonur 200/40

End of mission
- Deactivated: 22 December 1991

Orbital parameters
- Reference system: Geocentric
- Regime: Geostationary

Instruments
- Optical telescope with 50 centimetres (20 in) aperture Infrared sensor/s Smaller telescopes

Kosmos 1894 (Russian: Космос 1894 meaning Cosmos 1894) is a Soviet US-KS missile early warning satellite which was launched in 1987 as part of the Oko programme. The satellite is designed to identify missile launches using optical telescopes and infrared sensors.

Kosmos 2155 was launched from Site 200/40 at Baikonur Cosmodrome in the Kazakh SSR. A Proton-K carrier rocket with a DM-2 upper stage was used to perform the launch, which took place at 15:15 UTC on 28 October 1987. The launch successfully placed the satellite into geostationary orbit. It subsequently received its Kosmos designation, and the international designator 1987-091A. The United States Space Command assigned it the Satellite Catalog Number 18443.

It was operational for about 2 years.

== See also ==
- List of Kosmos satellites (1751–2000)
