= Early warning system =

System for early identification of hazards

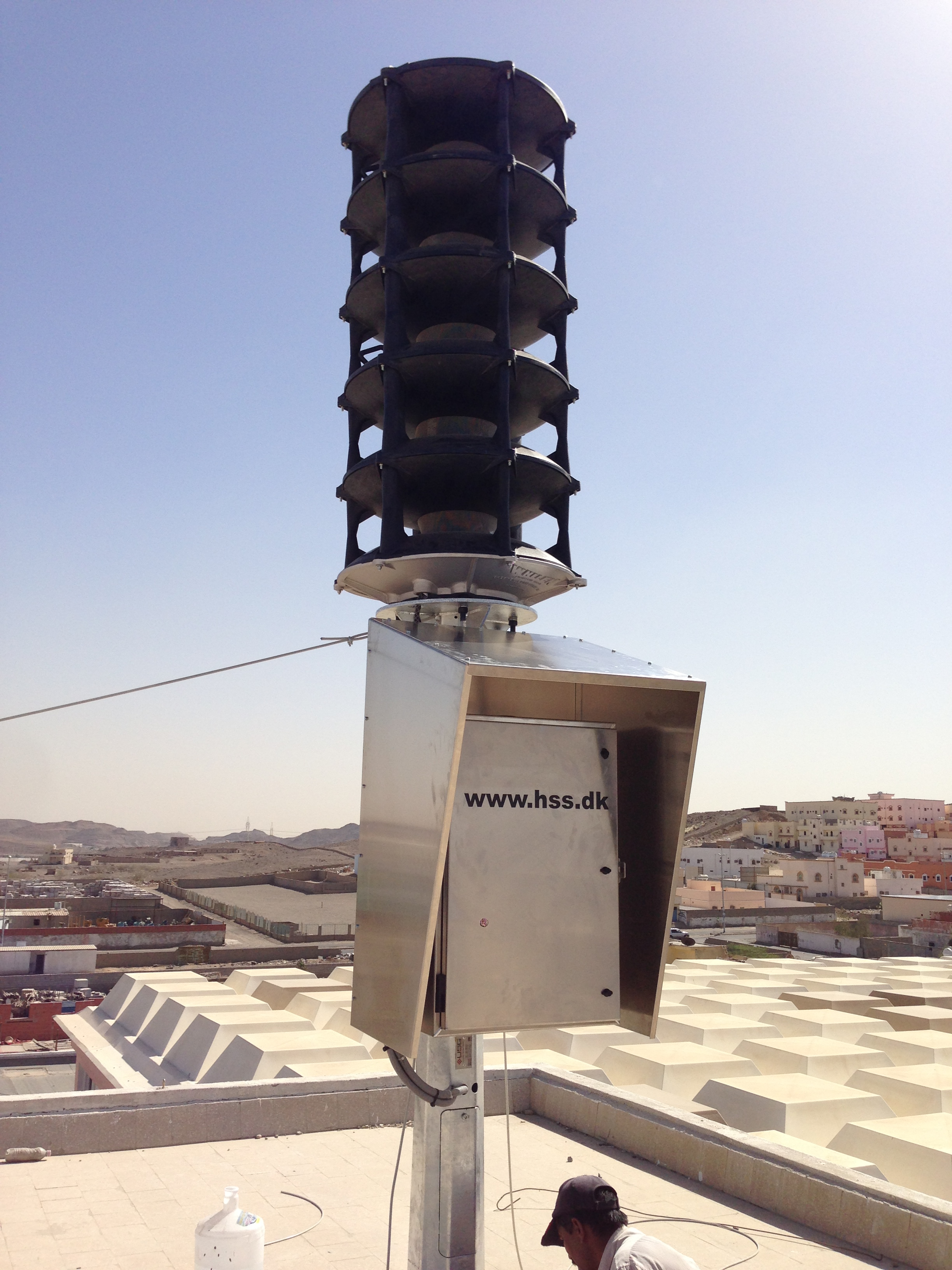
A HSS Engineering TWS 295 electronic Civil Defense siren.

An early warning system is a warning system that can be implemented as a chain of information communication systems and comprises sensors, event detection and decision subsystems for early identification of hazards. They work together to forecast and signal disturbances that adversely affect the stability of the physical world, providing time for the response system to prepare for the adverse event and to minimize its impact.

To be effective, early warning systems need to actively involve the communities at risk, facilitate public education and awareness of risks, effectively disseminate alerts, and warnings and ensure there is constant state of preparedness. A complete and effective early warning system supports four main functions: risk analysis, monitoring and warning; dissemination and communication; and a response capability.

== Application ==
Risk analysis involves systematically collecting data and undertaking risk assessments of predefined hazards and vulnerabilities. Monitoring and warning involves a study of the factors that indicate a disaster is imminent, as well as the methods used to detect these factors. Dissemination and communication concerns communicating the risk information and warnings to reach those in danger in a way that is clear and understandable. Finally, an adequate response capability requires the building of national and community response plan, testing of the plan, and the promotion of readiness to ensure that people know how to respond to warnings.

An early warning system is more than a warning system, which is simply a means by which an alert can be disseminated to the public.

=== In defense ===
Early-warning radars, early warning satellites, and Airborne early warning and control are systems used for detecting potential missile attacks. Throughout human history the warning systems that use such have malfunctioned several times, including some nuclear-weapons-related false alarms. Due to the massive availability of information through (social) media, early-warning systems that use these vast amounts of information are also developed to potentially detect risks of terrorism and novel terror attacks. This builds on the assumption that aggregated news coverage functions as a wisdom-of-the-crowd mechanism, where aggregated (and quantified) information can provide a reliable and cost-effective source of information for more accurate and precise predictions.

The easiest or most likely artificial signals from Earth to be detectable from around distant stars are brief pulses transmitted by such anti-ballistic missile (ABM) early-warning and space-surveillance radars during the Cold War and later astronomical and military radars.

=== For natural disasters ===
Scientists are researching and developing systems to predict eruptions of volcanoes, earthquakes and other natural disasters.

==== Earthquakes ====
An animation detailing how earthquake warning systems work: When P waves are detected, the readings are analysed immediately, and, if needed, the warning information is distributed to advanced users and cell phones, radio, television, sirens, and PA systems/fire alarm systems before the arrival of S waves.

An earthquake early warning (EEW) system is a system of accelerometers, seismometers, communication, computers, and alarms that is devised for rapidly notifying adjoining regions of a substantial earthquake once one begins. This is not the same as earthquake prediction, which is currently not capable of producing decisive event warnings.

=== For diseases ===
Early warning systems could be developed and used to prevent and mitigate pandemics, e.g. before they spillover from other animals to humans, and disease outbreaks.

=== For climate adaptation ===
Because of changes in extreme weather and sea level rise, due to climate change, the UN has recommended early warning systems as key elements of climate change adaptation and climate risk management. Flooding, cyclones and other rapidly changing weather events can make communities in coastal areas, along flood zones and reliant on agriculture very vulnerable to extreme events. To this end the UN is running a partnership titled "Climate Risk and Early Warning Systems" to aid high risk countries with neglected warning systems in developing them.

European countries have also seen early warning systems help communities adapt to drought, heat waves, disease, fire, and other related effects of climate change. Similarly the WHO recommends early warning systems to prevent increases in heatwave related morbidity and disease outbreaks.

=== Monitoring attempts at solar radiation modification ===
U.S. government agencies are operating an airborne early warning system for detecting small concentrations of aerosols to detect where other countries might be carrying out geoengineering attempts. Solar radiation modification is thought to have unpredictable effects on climate.

=== For chemical concerns ===
A large number of chemical substances (approximately 350,000) have been created and used without full understanding of the hazards and risks that they each pose. Chemicals have the potential to cause environmental degradation and harm to human health. Chemical prioritisation and early warning systems are being created to help understand which chemicals should be focused upon for regulatory interventions.

The Environment Agency in England have set up a National scale Prioritisation and Early Warning System (PEWS) for contaminants of emerging concern.

== History ==
Since the Indian Ocean tsunami of 26 December 2004, there has been a surge of interest in developing early warning systems. However, early warning systems can be used to detect a wide range of events, such as vehicular collisions, missile launches, disease outbreaks, and so forth. See warning system for a wider list of applications that also can be supported by early warning systems.

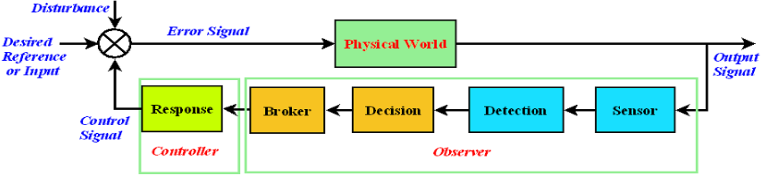
EWS Observer Controller Model and the Subsystem

== See also ==
- Bioindicator — a species that reveals the status of the environment
- Emergency communication system
