= Blok 2BL =

The Blok 2BL was a Russian rocket stage, a member of Blok L family, used as an upper stage on some versions of the Molniya-M carrier rocket. It was used as a fourth stage to launch the Oko missile early warning defence spacecraft. It was in use between 1972 and 2010.
