= Molniya-M =

Soviet space launcher rocket

Molniya-M (R-7 8K78M)
- Drawing of the Molniya-M carrier rocket
- Function: Medium-lift launch vehicle
- Manufacturer: TsSKB-Progress
- Country of origin: Soviet Union · Russia

Size
- Height: 43.4 m (142.3 ft)
- Diameter: 2.95 m (9.67 ft)
- Mass: 305,000 kg (672,000 lb)
- Stages: 3

Associated rockets
- Family: R-7
- Comparable: Soyuz-2/Fregat

Launch history
- Status: Retired
- Launch sites: Baikonur, Sites 1/5 & 31/6; Plesetsk, Sites 16/2, 41/1 & 43
- Total launches: 297
- Success(es): 276
- Failure(s): 21
- First flight: 4 October 1965
- Last flight: 30 September 2010

The Molniya-M (Russian: Молния, lit. 'lightning', GRAU index: 8K78M) was a Soviet and Russian launch vehicle derived from the R-7 Semyorka Intercontinental ballistic missile (ICBM).

The original 8K78 booster had been the product of a rushed development program and its launch record was no better than the 8K72 Luna booster of 1958–1960. As 1962 ended, there had been 12 launches of 8K78s, ten of which failed (five Block L failures, four Block I failures, and one failure caused by the Block A core stage).

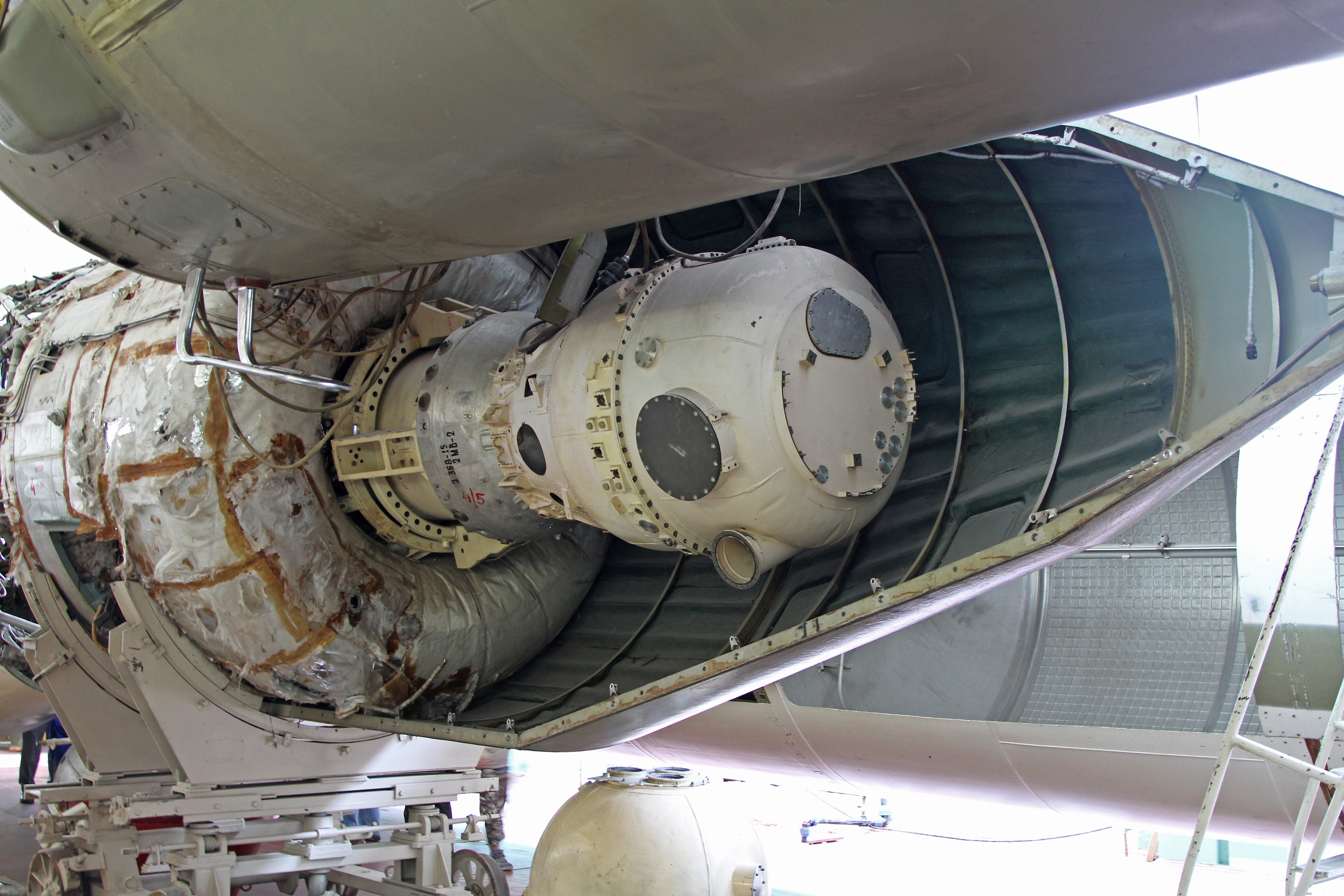
Block L and 2MV planetary probe

The two successful launches had had their probes (Venera 1 and Mars 1) fail en route to their respective planetary targets. As such, work began at the Korolev Bureau to improve the basic 8K78 vehicle. The core and strap-ons received the up-rated 8D74M engines and the Kosberg Bureau completely redesigned the Block I stage. The Block L engine was also slightly enhanced. The first six 8K78Ms built used RD-0108 engines in the Block I stage, which was also used in the two crewed Voskhod boosters, all subsequent 8K78Ms using RD-0110 engines which were shared with the Soyuz booster. Molniya boosters flown after the adaption of the new 11A511U core in 1973 used the improved 11D511 first stage engines. While 11A511U cores flown on other R-7 vehicles switched to a shorter instrument packet, the Molniya continued using the old "long" instrument packet.

The 8K78M first flew on 4 October 1965 when it launched Luna 7 but the existing stock of 8K78s had not been used up yet and they continued to fly until 1967. By 1966, the 8K78M hardware was standardized across the board for all R-7 based vehicles with the exception of Voskhod boosters that used the less powerful RD-0107 engine. It made 297 launches and experienced 21 failures. The 8K78M was a generally reliable vehicle with most failures caused by the Block L and no Block I's malfunctioned on a launch after 1968. There was only a single failure of the first two stages, which occurred in 2005 on one of the last 8K78Ms flown. That 21 June, an attempted launch of a Molniya satellite from Plesetsk went awry. The launch went entirely according to plan until T+298 seconds when the Block I shut down after just eight seconds of operation. The launcher, which was at an altitude of 180 km (111 miles), reentered the atmosphere, broke up, and impacted near the town of Tobolsk. Initial speculation was that the Block I either malfunctioned or staging had failed in a similar manner to Soyuz 18-1 in 1975. The investigation ultimately found a quite different cause. The Block A experienced a racing fuel regulator starting at T+26 seconds that caused premature RP-1 depletion and turbopump overspeed from the pump running empty. The pump disintegrated, tearing up the engine compartment. By coincidence, this happened simultaneous with the scheduled Block A staging at T+290 seconds, but the shock from the pump disintegration prevented the separation command from being sent. Block I ignited while still attached to Block A but the dead weight of the spent core stage dragged it off course and the AVD system, sensing the improper flight trajectory, issued an automatic shutdown command. The final flight of a Molniya-M lofted an Oko early warning satellite from Plesetsk on 30 September 2010 despite some apprehension that the launch vehicle, manufactured in 2005, had exceeded its storage life. It was replaced by the Soyuz-2/Fregat.

Although originally developed for planetary probes, those had switched to the larger Proton booster by the 1970s due to increasing mass and complexity. For most of its operational life, the Molniya-M was used to launch its namesake Molniya and also Oko satellites into Molniya orbits, orbits of high eccentricity that allow satellites to dwell over polar regions.

== Variants ==
There were four main variants of the Molniya-M, which varied in terms of their upper stage. Originally, the Block L stage was used (Molniya-M (Blok-L)); however, uprated versions replaced this with more powerful, or specialized, stages, for different missions. The Molniya-M (Blok-2BL), used to launch Oko missile defense spacecraft, had a Block 2BL upper stage, The Molniya-M (Blok-ML) had a Block ML upper stage, and the Molniya-M (Blok-SO-L) had a Block SO-L stage.

Molniya-M 8K78M Variants
Version	Strap-ons	Stage 1	Stage 2	Stage 3
Molniya-M (Blok-L)	Blok-B,V,G,D / 4 × RD-107MM	Blok-A / RD-108MM	Blok-I / RD-0110	Blok-L / S1.5400
Molniya-M (Blok-ML)	Blok-B,V,G,D / 4 × RD-107MM	Blok-A / RD-108MM	Blok-I / RD-0110	Blok-ML / S1.5400
Molniya-M (Blok-VL)	Blok-B,V,G,D / 4 × RD-107MM	Blok-A / RD-108MM	Blok-I / RD-0110	Blok-VL / S1.5400
Molniya-M (Blok-MVL)	Blok-B,V,G,D / 4 × RD-107MM	Blok-A / RD-108MM	Blok-I / RD-0110	Blok-MVL / S1.5400
Molniya-M (Blok-2BL)	Blok-B,V,G,D / 4 × RD-107MM	Blok-A / RD-108MM	Blok-I / RD-0110	Blok-2BL / S1.5400
Molniya-M (Blok-SO-L)	Blok-B,V,G,D / 4 × RD-107MM	Blok-A / RD-108MM	Blok-I / RD-0110	Blok-SO-L / S1.5400

== Retirement ==
The Molniya-M (Blok-ML) was scheduled to be the last variant to fly, with two launches of Molniya spacecraft scheduled to occur in 2008; however, they were cancelled in light of the launch failure in 2005, in favour of the Meridian spacecraft. The Molniya-M was believed to have been retired on 23 October 2007 after launching an Oko spacecraft Kosmos 2430; however, this later proved to have been incorrect, when a Molniya-M was used to launch another Oko satellite, Kosmos 2446, on 2 December 2008. Following a launch of Kosmos 2469 on 30 September 2010, the Russian Space Forces confirmed that it had been retired from service.

== See also ==
- Molniya
