= Progress 29 =

Soviet uncrewed Progress cargo spacecraft

- A Progress 7K-TG spacecraft
- Mission type: Mir resupply
- COSPAR ID: 1987-034A
- SATCAT no.: 17878

Spacecraft properties
- Spacecraft: Progress (No.127)
- Spacecraft type: Progress 7K-TG
- Manufacturer: NPO Energia

Start of mission
- Launch date: 21 April 1987, 15:14:17 UTC
- Rocket: Soyuz-U2
- Launch site: Baikonur, Site 1/5

End of mission
- Disposal: Deorbited
- Decay date: 11 May 1987, 07:51:16 UTC

Orbital parameters
- Reference system: Geocentric
- Regime: Low Earth
- Perigee altitude: 189 km
- Apogee altitude: 237 km
- Inclination: 51.6°
- Period: 88.8 minutes
- Epoch: 21 April 1987

Docking with Mir
- Docking port: Kvant-1 aft
- Docking date: 21 April 1987, 15:14:17 UTC
- Undocking date: 11 May 1987, 03:10:01 UTC

Progress 29 (Russian: Прогресс 29) was a Soviet uncrewed Progress cargo spacecraft, which was launched in April 1987 to resupply the Mir space station.

== Launch ==
Progress 29 launched on 21 April 1987 from the Baikonur Cosmodrome in the Kazakh SSR. It used a Soyuz-U2 rocket.

== Docking ==
Progress 29 docked with the aft port of the Kvant-1 module of Mir on 21 April 1987 at 15:14:17 UTC, and was undocked on 11 May 1987 at 03:10:01 UTC.

== Decay ==
It remained in orbit until 11 May 1987, when it was deorbited. The deorbit burn occurred at 07:51:16 UTC and the mission ended at 08:28 UTC.

== See also ==
- 1987 in spaceflight
- List of Progress missions
- List of uncrewed spaceflights to Mir
