= Progress 39 =

Soviet uncrewed Progress cargo spacecraft

- A Progress 7K-TG spacecraft
- Mission type: Mir resupply
- COSPAR ID: 1988-114A
- SATCAT no.: 19728

Spacecraft properties
- Spacecraft: Progress (No.147)
- Spacecraft type: Progress 7K-TG
- Manufacturer: NPO Energia

Start of mission
- Launch date: 25 December 1988, 04:11:37 UTC
- Rocket: Soyuz-U2
- Launch site: Baikonur, Site 1/5

End of mission
- Disposal: Deorbited
- Decay date: 7 February 1989, 13:49 UTC

Orbital parameters
- Reference system: Geocentric
- Regime: Low Earth
- Perigee altitude: 187 km
- Apogee altitude: 238 km
- Inclination: 51.6°
- Period: 88.8 minutes
- Epoch: 25 December 1988

Docking with Mir
- Docking port: Kvant-1 aft
- Docking date: 27 December 1988, 05:35:10 UTC
- Undocking date: 7 February 1989, 06:45:34 UTC

Progress 39 (Russian: Прогресс 39) was a Soviet unmanned Progress cargo spacecraft, which was launched in December 1988 to resupply the Mir EO-4 expedition aboard the Mir space station.

== Launch ==
Progress 39 launched on 25 December 1988 from the Baikonur Cosmodrome in the Kazakh SSR. It used a Soyuz-U2 rocket.

== Docking ==
Progress 39 docked with the aft port of the Kvant-1 module of Mir on 27 December 1988 at 05:35:10 UTC, and was undocked on 7 February 1989 at 06:45:34 UTC.

== Decay ==
It remained in orbit until 7 February 1989, when it was deorbited. The deorbit burn occurred at around 12:49 UTC and the mission ended at 13:49 UTC.

== See also ==
- 1988 in spaceflight
- List of Progress missions
- List of uncrewed spaceflights to Mir
