= Progress 35 =

Soviet uncrewed Progress cargo spacecraft

- A Progress 7K-TG spacecraft
- Mission type: Mir resupply
- COSPAR ID: 1988-024A
- SATCAT no.: 18992

Spacecraft properties
- Spacecraft: Progress (No.143)
- Spacecraft type: Progress 7K-TG
- Manufacturer: NPO Energia

Start of mission
- Launch date: 23 March 1988, 21:05:12 UTC
- Rocket: Soyuz-U2
- Launch site: Baikonur, Site 1/5

End of mission
- Disposal: Deorbited
- Decay date: 5 May 1988, 06:01:30 UTC

Orbital parameters
- Reference system: Geocentric
- Regime: Low Earth
- Perigee altitude: 185 km
- Apogee altitude: 262 km
- Inclination: 51.6°
- Period: 89 minutes
- Epoch: 23 March 1988

Docking with Mir
- Docking port: Kvant-1 aft
- Docking date: 25 March 1988, 22:21:35 UTC
- Undocking date: 5 May 1988, 01:36:03 UTC

Progress 35 (Russian: Прогресс 35) was a Soviet uncrewed Progress cargo spacecraft, which was launched in March 1988 to resupply the Mir space station.

== Launch ==
Progress 35 launched on 23 March 1988 from the Baikonur Cosmodrome in the Kazakh SSR. It used a Soyuz-U2 rocket.

== Docking ==
Progress 35 docked with the aft port of the Kvant-1 module of Mir on 25 March 1988 at 22:21:35 UTC, and was undocked on 5 May 1988 at 01:36:03 UTC.

== Decay ==
It remained in orbit until 5 May 1988, when it was deorbited. The deorbit burn occurred at 06:01:30 UTC and the mission ended at 06:56:19 UTC.

== See also ==
- 1988 in spaceflight
- List of Progress missions
- List of uncrewed spaceflights to Mir
