= Progress 31 =

Soviet uncrewed Progress cargo spacecraft

- A Progress 7K-TG spacecraft
- Mission type: Mir resupply
- COSPAR ID: 1987-066A
- SATCAT no.: 18283

Spacecraft properties
- Spacecraft: Progress (No.138)
- Spacecraft type: Progress 7K-TG
- Manufacturer: NPO Energia

Start of mission
- Launch date: 3 August 1987, 20:44:11 UTC
- Rocket: Soyuz-U2
- Launch site: Baikonur, Site 1/5

End of mission
- Disposal: Deorbited
- Decay date: 23 September 1987, 00:22:00 UTC

Orbital parameters
- Reference system: Geocentric
- Regime: Low Earth
- Perigee altitude: 187 km
- Apogee altitude: 250 km
- Inclination: 51.6°
- Period: 88.9 minutes
- Epoch: 3 August 1987

Docking with Mir
- Docking port: Kvant-1 aft
- Docking date: 5 August 1987, 22:27:35 UTC
- Undocking date: 21 September 1987, 23:57:41 UTC

Progress 31 (Russian: Прогресс 31) was a Soviet uncrewed Progress cargo spacecraft, which was launched in August 1987 to resupply the Mir space station.

== Launch ==
Progress 31 launched on 3 August 1987 from the Baikonur Cosmodrome in the Kazakh SSR. It used a Soyuz-U2 rocket.

== Docking ==
Progress 31 docked with the aft port of the Kvant-1 module of Mir on 5 August 1987 at 22:27:35 UTC, and was undocked on 21 September 1987 at 23:57:41 UTC.

== Decay ==
It remained in orbit until 23 September 1987, when it was deorbited. The deorbit burn occurred at 00:22:00 UTC and the mission ended at 01:02 UTC.

== See also ==
- 1987 in spaceflight
- List of Progress missions
- List of uncrewed spaceflights to Mir
