= Progress 33 =

Soviet uncrewed Progress cargo spacecraft

- A Progress 7K-TG spacecraft
- Mission type: Mir resupply
- COSPAR ID: 1987-094A
- SATCAT no.: 18568

Spacecraft properties
- Spacecraft: Progress (No.140)
- Spacecraft type: Progress 7K-TG
- Manufacturer: NPO Energia

Start of mission
- Launch date: 20 November 1987, 23:47:12 UTC
- Rocket: Soyuz-U2
- Launch site: Baikonur, Site 1/5

End of mission
- Disposal: Deorbited
- Decay date: 19 December 1987, 12:56:00 UTC

Orbital parameters
- Reference system: Geocentric
- Regime: Low Earth
- Perigee altitude: 326 km
- Apogee altitude: 343 km
- Inclination: 51.6°
- Period: 91.2 minutes
- Epoch: 20 November 1987

Docking with Mir
- Docking port: Kvant-1 aft
- Docking date: 23 November 1987, 01:39:13 UTC
- Undocking date: 19 December 1987, 08:15:46 UTC

Progress 33 (Russian: Прогресс 33) was a Soviet uncrewed Progress cargo spacecraft, which was launched in November 1987 to resupply the Mir space station.

== Launch ==
Progress 33 launched on 20 November 1987 from the Baikonur Cosmodrome in the Kazakh SSR. It used a Soyuz-U2 rocket.

== Docking ==
Progress 33 docked with the aft port of the Kvant-1 module of Mir on 23 November 1987 at 01:39:13 UTC, and was undocked on 19 December 1987 at 08:15:46 UTC.

== Decay ==
It remained in orbit until 19 December 1987, when it was deorbited. The deorbit burn occurred at 12:56:00 UTC and the mission ended at 13:37 UTC.

== See also ==
- 1987 in spaceflight
- List of Progress missions
- List of uncrewed spaceflights to Mir
