= Progress 30 =

Soviet uncrewed Progress cargo spacecraft

- A Progress 7K-TG spacecraft
- Mission type: Mir resupply
- COSPAR ID: 1987-044A
- SATCAT no.: 17999

Spacecraft properties
- Spacecraft: Progress (No.128)
- Spacecraft type: Progress 7K-TG
- Manufacturer: NPO Energia

Start of mission
- Launch date: 19 May 1987, 04:02:10 UTC
- Rocket: Soyuz-U2
- Launch site: Baikonur, Site 1/5

End of mission
- Disposal: Deorbited
- Decay date: 19 July 1987, 05:00:00 UTC

Orbital parameters
- Reference system: Geocentric
- Regime: Low Earth
- Perigee altitude: 341 km
- Apogee altitude: 365 km
- Inclination: 51.6°
- Period: 91.6 minutes
- Epoch: 19 May 1987

Docking with Mir
- Docking port: Kvant-1 aft
- Docking date: 21 May 1987, 05:50:38 UTC
- Undocking date: 19 July 1987, 00:19:51 UTC

Progress 30 (Russian: Прогресс 30) was a Soviet uncrewed Progress cargo spacecraft, which was launched in May 1987 to resupply the Mir space station.

== Launch ==
Progress 30 launched on 19 May 1987 from the Baikonur Cosmodrome in the Kazakh SSR. It used a Soyuz-U2 rocket.

== Docking ==
Progress 30 docked with the aft port of the Kvant-1 module of Mir on 21 May 1987 at 05:50:38 UTC, and was undocked on 19 July 1987 at 00:19:51 UTC.

== Decay ==
It remained in orbit until 19 July 1987, when it was deorbited. The deorbit burn occurred at 05:00:00 UTC and the mission ended at 05:42 UTC.

== See also ==
- 1987 in spaceflight
- List of Progress missions
- List of uncrewed spaceflights to Mir
