= Progress 34 =

Soviet uncrewed Progress cargo spacecraft

- A Progress 7K-TG spacecraft
- Mission type: Mir resupply
- COSPAR ID: 1988-003A
- SATCAT no.: 18795

Spacecraft properties
- Spacecraft: Progress (No.142)
- Spacecraft type: Progress 7K-TG
- Manufacturer: NPO Energia

Start of mission
- Launch date: 20 January 1988, 22:51:54 UTC
- Rocket: Soyuz-U2
- Launch site: Baikonur, Site 1/5

End of mission
- Disposal: Deorbited
- Decay date: 4 March 1988, 06:45:00 UTC

Orbital parameters
- Reference system: Geocentric
- Regime: Low Earth
- Perigee altitude: 329 km
- Apogee altitude: 347 km
- Inclination: 51.6°
- Period: 91.3 minutes
- Epoch: 20 January 1988

Docking with Mir
- Docking port: Kvant-1 aft
- Docking date: 23 January 1988, 00:09:09 UTC
- Undocking date: 4 March 1988, 03:40:09 UTC

Progress 34 (Russian: Прогресс 34) was a Soviet uncrewed Progress cargo spacecraft, which was launched in January 1988 to resupply the Mir space station.

== Launch ==
Progress 34 launched on 20 January 1988 from the Baikonur Cosmodrome in the Kazakh SSR. It used a Soyuz-U2 rocket.

== Docking ==
Progress 34 docked with the aft port of the Kvant-1 module of Mir on 23 January 1988 at 00:09:09 UTC, and was undocked on 4 March 1988 at 03:40:09 UTC.

== Decay ==
It remained in orbit until 4 March 1988, when it was deorbited. The deorbit burn occurred at 06:45:00 UTC and the mission ended at 07:29:30 UTC.

== See also ==
- 1988 in spaceflight
- List of Progress missions
- List of uncrewed spaceflights to Mir
