= Progress 37 =

Soviet spacecraft

- A Progress 7K-TG spacecraft
- Mission type: Mir resupply
- COSPAR ID: 1988-061A
- SATCAT no.: 19322

Spacecraft properties
- Spacecraft: Progress (No.145)
- Spacecraft type: Progress 7K-TG
- Manufacturer: NPO Energia

Start of mission
- Launch date: 18 July 1988, 21:13:09 UTC
- Rocket: Soyuz-U2
- Launch site: Baikonur, Site 1/5

End of mission
- Disposal: Deorbited
- Decay date: 12 August 1988, 12:51:30 UTC

Orbital parameters
- Reference system: Geocentric
- Regime: Low Earth
- Perigee altitude: 189 km
- Apogee altitude: 256 km
- Inclination: 51.6°
- Period: 89 minutes
- Epoch: 18 July 1988

Docking with Mir
- Docking port: Kvant-1 aft
- Docking date: 20 July 1988, 22:33:40 UTC
- Undocking date: 12 August 1988, 08:31:54 UTC

Progress 37 (Russian: Прогресс 37) was a Soviet uncrewed Progress cargo spacecraft, which was launched in July 1988 to resupply the Mir space station.

== Launch ==
Progress 37 launched on 18 July 1988 from the Baikonur Cosmodrome in the Kazakh SSR. It used a Soyuz-U2 rocket.

== Docking ==
Progress 37 docked with the aft port of the Kvant-1 module of Mir on 20 July 1988 at 22:33:40 UTC, and was undocked on 12 August 1988 at 08:31:54 UTC.

== Decay ==
It remained in orbit until 12 August 1988, when it was deorbited. The deorbit burn occurred at 12:51:30 UTC and the mission ended at 13:45:40 UTC.

== See also ==
- 1988 in spaceflight
- List of Progress missions
- List of uncrewed spaceflights to Mir
