= Progress 32 =

Soviet uncrewed Progress cargo spacecraft

- A Progress 7K-TG spacecraft
- Mission type: Mir resupply
- COSPAR ID: 1987-082A
- SATCAT no.: 18376

Spacecraft properties
- Spacecraft: Progress (No.139)
- Spacecraft type: Progress 7K-TG
- Manufacturer: NPO Energia

Start of mission
- Launch date: 23 September 1987, 23:43:54 UTC
- Rocket: Soyuz-U2
- Launch site: Baikonur, Site 1/5

End of mission
- Disposal: Deorbited
- Decay date: 19 November 1987, 00:10:00 UTC

Orbital parameters
- Reference system: Geocentric
- Regime: Low Earth
- Perigee altitude: 295 km
- Apogee altitude: 355 km
- Inclination: 51.6°
- Period: 91.0 minutes
- Epoch: 23 September 1987

Docking with Mir
- Docking port: Kvant-1 aft
- Docking date: 26 September 1987, 01:08:15 UTC
- Undocking date: 10 November 1987, 04:09:10 UTC

Docking with Mir
- Docking port: Kvant-1 aft
- Docking date: 10 November 1987, 05:47:25 UTC
- Undocking date: 17 November 1987, 19:24:37 UTC

Progress 32 (Russian: Прогресс 32) was a Soviet uncrewed Progress cargo spacecraft, which was launched in September 1987 to resupply the Mir space station.

== Launch ==
Progress 32 launched on 23 September 1987 from the Baikonur Cosmodrome in the Kazakh SSR. It used a Soyuz-U2 rocket.

== Docking ==
Progress 32 docked with the aft port of the Kvant-1 module of Mir on 26 September 1987 at 01:08:15 UTC, and was undocked on 10 November 1987 at 04:09:10 UTC. The vehicle was redocked at 05:47:25 UTC the same day and finally undocked on 17 November 1987 at 19:24:37 UTC.

== Decay ==
It remained in orbit until 19 November 1987, when it was deorbited. The deorbit burn occurred at 00:10:00 UTC and the mission ended at 00:58 UTC.

== See also ==
- 1987 in spaceflight
- List of Progress missions
- List of uncrewed spaceflights to Mir
