= Progress 36 =

Soviet uncrewed Progress cargo spacecraft

- A Progress 7K-TG spacecraft
- Mission type: Mir resupply
- COSPAR ID: 1988-038A
- SATCAT no.: 19117

Spacecraft properties
- Spacecraft: Progress (No.144)
- Spacecraft type: Progress 7K-TG
- Manufacturer: NPO Energia

Start of mission
- Launch date: 13 May 1988, 00:30:25 UTC
- Rocket: Soyuz-U2
- Launch site: Baikonur, Site 1/5

End of mission
- Disposal: Deorbited
- Decay date: 5 June 1988, 20:28:00 UTC

Orbital parameters
- Reference system: Geocentric
- Regime: Low Earth
- Perigee altitude: 185 km
- Apogee altitude: 246 km
- Inclination: 51.7°
- Period: 88.8 minutes
- Epoch: 13 May 1988

Docking with Mir
- Docking port: Kvant-1 aft
- Docking date: 15 May 1988, 02:13:26 UTC
- Undocking date: 5 June 1988, 11:11:55 UTC

Progress 36 (Russian: Прогресс 36) was a Soviet uncrewed Progress cargo spacecraft, which was launched in May 1988 to resupply the Mir space station.

== Launch ==
Progress 36 launched on 13 May 1988 from the Baikonur Cosmodrome in the Kazakh SSR. It used a Soyuz-U2 rocket.

== Docking ==
Progress 36 docked with the aft port of the Kvant-1 module of Mir on 15 May 1988 at 02:13:26 UTC, and was undocked on 5 June 1988 at 11:11:55 UTC.

== Decay ==
It remained in orbit until 5 June 1988, when it was deorbited. The deorbit burn occurred at 20:28:00 UTC and the mission ended at 21:18:40 UTC.

== See also ==
- 1988 in spaceflight
- List of Progress missions
- List of uncrewed spaceflights to Mir
