= Progress 38 =

Soviet uncrewed Progress cargo spacecraft

- A Progress 7K-TG spacecraft
- Mission type: Mir resupply
- COSPAR ID: 1988-083A
- SATCAT no.: 19486

Spacecraft properties
- Spacecraft: Progress (No.146)
- Spacecraft type: Progress 7K-TG
- Manufacturer: NPO Energia

Start of mission
- Launch date: 9 September 1988, 23:33:40 UTC
- Rocket: Soyuz-U2
- Launch site: Baikonur, Site 1/5

End of mission
- Disposal: Deorbited
- Decay date: 23 November 1988, 18:26:00 UTC

Orbital parameters
- Reference system: Geocentric
- Regime: Low Earth
- Perigee altitude: 187 km
- Apogee altitude: 248 km
- Inclination: 51.6°
- Period: 88.9 minutes
- Epoch: 9 September 1988

Docking with Mir
- Docking port: Kvant-1 aft
- Docking date: 12 September 1988, 01:22:28 UTC
- Undocking date: 23 November 1988, 12:12:46 UTC

Progress 38 (Russian: Прогресс 38) was a Soviet uncrewed Progress cargo spacecraft, which was launched in September 1988 to resupply the Mir space station.

== Launch ==
Progress 38 launched on 9 September 1988 from the Baikonur Cosmodrome in the Kazakh SSR. It used a Soyuz-U2 rocket.

== Docking ==
Progress 38 docked with the aft port of the Kvant-1 module of Mir on 12 September 1988 at 01:22:28 UTC, and was undocked on 23 November 1988 at 12:12:46 UTC.

== Decay ==
It remained in orbit until 23 November 1988, when it was deorbited. The deorbit burn occurred at 18:26:00 UTC and the mission ended at 19:06:58 UTC.

== See also ==
- 1988 in spaceflight
- List of Progress missions
- List of uncrewed spaceflights to Mir
