= Progress 27 =

Soviet uncrewed Progress cargo spacecraft

- A Progress 7K-TG spacecraft
- Mission type: Mir resupply
- COSPAR ID: 1987-005A
- SATCAT no.: 17299

Spacecraft properties
- Spacecraft: Progress (No.135)
- Spacecraft type: Progress 7K-TG
- Manufacturer: NPO Energia

Start of mission
- Launch date: 16 January 1987, 06:06:23 UTC
- Rocket: Soyuz-U2
- Launch site: Baikonur, Site 1/5

End of mission
- Disposal: Deorbited
- Decay date: 25 February 1987, 15:16:45 UTC

Orbital parameters
- Reference system: Geocentric
- Regime: Low Earth
- Perigee altitude: 183 km
- Apogee altitude: 263 km
- Inclination: 51.6°
- Period: 89.0 minutes
- Epoch: 16 January 1987

Docking with Mir
- Docking port: Mir Core Module aft
- Docking date: 18 January 1987, 07:26:50 UTC
- Undocking date: 23 February 1987, 11:29:01 UTC

Progress 27 (Russian: Прогресс 27) was a Soviet uncrewed Progress cargo spacecraft, which was launched in January 1987 to resupply the Mir space station.

== Launch ==
Progress 27 launched on 16 January 1987 from the Baikonur Cosmodrome in the Kazakh SSR. It used a Soyuz-U2 rocket.

== Docking ==
Progress 27 docked with the aft port of the Mir Core Module on 18 January 1987 at 07:26:50 UTC, and was undocked on 23 February 1987 at 11:29:01 UTC.

== Decay ==
It remained in orbit until 25 February 1987, when it was deorbited. The deorbit burn occurred at 15:16:45 UTC and the mission ended at 16:05 UTC.

== See also ==
- 1987 in spaceflight
- List of Progress missions
- List of uncrewed spaceflights to Mir
