= Progress 28 =

Soviet uncrewed Progress cargo spacecraft

- A Progress 7K-TG spacecraft
- Mission type: Mir resupply
- COSPAR ID: 1987-023A
- SATCAT no.: 17564

Spacecraft properties
- Spacecraft: Progress (No.137)
- Spacecraft type: Progress 7K-TG
- Manufacturer: NPO Energia

Start of mission
- Launch date: 3 March 1987, 11:14:05 UTC
- Rocket: Soyuz-U2
- Launch site: Baikonur, Site 1/5

End of mission
- Disposal: Deorbited
- Decay date: 28 March 1987, 03:01:01 UTC

Orbital parameters
- Reference system: Geocentric
- Regime: Low Earth
- Perigee altitude: 185 km
- Apogee altitude: 254 km
- Inclination: 51.6°
- Period: 88.9 minutes
- Epoch: 3 March 1987

Docking with Mir
- Docking port: Mir Core Module aft
- Docking date: 5 March 1987, 12:42:36 UTC
- Undocking date: 26 March 1987, 05:06:48 UTC

Progress 28 (Russian: Прогресс 28) was a Soviet uncrewed Progress cargo spacecraft, which was launched in March 1987 to resupply the Mir space station.

== Launch ==
Progress 28 launched on 3 March 1987 from the Baikonur Cosmodrome in the Kazakh SSR. It used a Soyuz-U2 rocket.

== Docking ==
Progress 28 docked with the aft port of the Mir Core Module on 5 March 1987 at 12:42:36 UTC, and was undocked on 26 March 1987 at 05:06:48 UTC.

== Decay ==
It remained in orbit until 28 March 1987, when it was deorbited. The deorbit burn occurred at 03:01:01 UTC and the mission ended at 03:49 UTC.

== See also ==
- 1987 in spaceflight
- List of Progress missions
- List of uncrewed spaceflights to Mir
