= List of Progress missions =

Uncrewed Russian cargo spacecraft

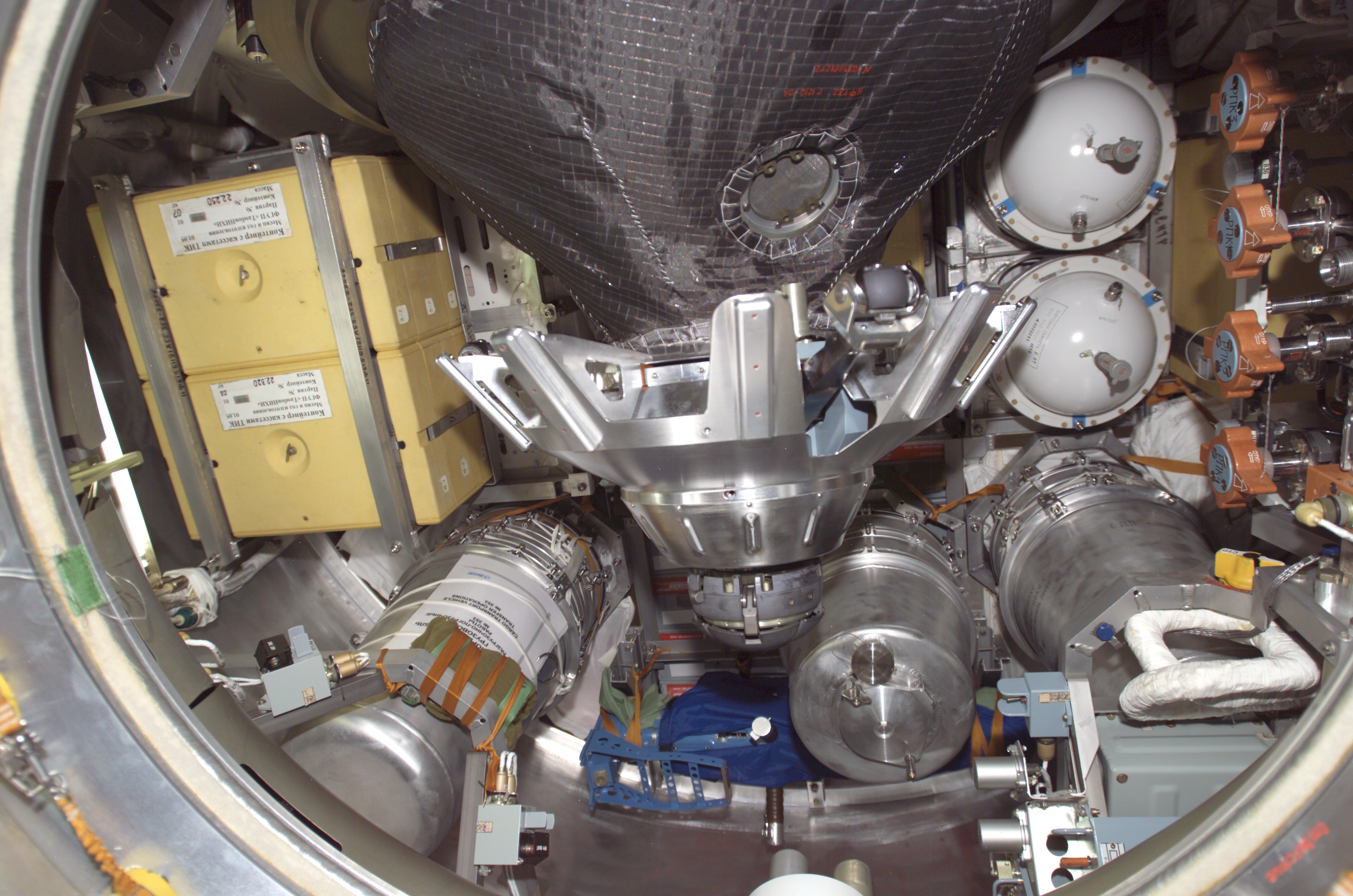
For more than three decades, over 167 Progress robot spacecraft have provided logistical support to the Soviet/Russian space program in low Earth orbit.

This is a list of missions conducted by Progress automated spacecraft. Progress is an uncrewed Russian (previously Soviet) cargo spacecraft which has been used since 1978 to deliver supplies to Soviet space stations Salyut 6, Salyut 7, Mir, and later to the International Space Station. All launches have occurred from the Baikonur Cosmodrome.

More than 178 flights have been launched, all except Progress M-12M, Progress M-27M and Progress MS-04/65P have reached their destinations, with no injuries or loss of life after launch; Progress M-12M and MS-04 failed during launch, whereas Progress M-27M experienced a spacecraft loss of attitude control while in orbit. The Progress M-24 spacecraft collided with Mir during a failed docking attempt in 1994, and Progress M-34 caused serious damage to the Spektr module when it drifted off course during a docking test in 1997.

The spacecraft uses the automatic Kurs docking system for rendezvous with its destination space station, where crew are used in supervisory roles, only intervening using the manual TORU system when problems occur. Five variants of the Progress spacecraft have been flown so far: Progress 7K-TG (1978–1990), Progress-M 11F615A55 (1989–2009), Progress-M1 (2000–2004), Progress-М 11F615A60 (2008–2015) and Progress-MS (since 2015). In addition, three custom Progress M variants were launched to deliver ISS modules Pirs in 2001, Poisk in 2009 and Prichal in late 2021.

== Flights ==
=== Flights to Salyut 6 ===
All Progress spacecraft traveling to Salyut 6 were launched by the Soyuz-U, and dockings were to the rear port of the station. Progress 7 deployed the KRT-10 astronomy satellite.

=== Flights to Salyut 7 ===
Kosmos 1669 is the only Progress spacecraft to have received a Kosmos designation, which is usually reserved for the military, experimental and failed spacecraft.

Veteran enthusiast Robert Christy suggests this may have been an error due to confusion with a TKS spacecraft which later became Kosmos 1686. Astronautix.com suggests that the spacecraft may have gone out of control shortly after launch, but then been recovered after the Kosmos designation had been applied. Alternatively, it could have been given the designation as it was used to test modifications that would be used on future Progress missions. Some news agencies reported that it was a free-flying Progress-derived spacecraft, or that it was a new type of spacecraft derived from the Progress.

=== Flights to Mir ===
The small capsule called Raduga was used for recovery of materials from the Mir station.

=== Flights to ISS ===
Currently, resupply missions often use the Russian Progress spacecraft. As of 2020, Progress spacecraft have flown most of the uncrewed missions to the ISS.

== Missions ==
No.	Spacecraft	S/N	Launch (UTC)	Carrier rocket	Launch pad	Docking			Deorbit (UTC)	Remarks
No.	Spacecraft	S/N	Launch (UTC)	Carrier rocket	Launch pad	Station/ Port	Docking (UTC)	Undocking (UTC)	Deorbit (UTC)	Remarks
1	Progress 1	102	20 January 1978; 08:25	Soyuz-U	Site 31/6	Salyut 6 rear	22 January; 10:12:14	6 February; 05:54:00	8 February; 02:00:00	Maiden flight of the Progress spacecraft. First Progress flight to Salyut 6. First flight of the Progress 7K-TG version. First refuel in orbit, from Progress to Salyut (Feb 2002).
2	Progress 2	101	7 July 1978; 11:26	Soyuz-U	Site 31/6	Salyut 6 rear	9 July; 12:58:59	2 August; 04:57:44	4 August; 01:31:07	
3	Progress 3	103	8 August 1978; 22:31	Soyuz-U	Site 31/6	Salyut 6 rear	9 August; 23:59:30	21 August; 15:42:50	23 August; 16:45:00	
4	Progress 4	105	4 October 1978; 23:09	Soyuz-U	Site 1/5	Salyut 6 rear	6 October; 01:00:15	24 October; 13:01:52	26 October; 16:28:13	
5	Progress 5	104	12 March 1979; 05:47	Soyuz-U	Site 31/6	Salyut 6 rear	14 March; 07:19:21	3 April; 16:10:00	5 April; 00:10:22	Served as a receptacle for contaminated fuel from the damaged Salyut 6 propulsion system.
6	Progress 6	106	13 May 1979; 04:17	Soyuz-U	Site 31/6	Salyut 6 rear	15 May; 06:19:22	8 June; 07:59:41	9 June; 18:52:46	
7	Progress 7	107	28 June 1979; 09:25	Soyuz-U	Site 31/6	Salyut 6 rear	30 June; 11:18:22	18 July; 03:49:55	20 July; 01:57:30	Transported the KRT-10 radio telescope to Salyut 6.
8	Progress 8	108	27 March 1980; 18:53	Soyuz-U	Site 31/6	Salyut 6 rear	29 March; 20:01:00	25 April; 08:04:00	26 April; 06:54:00	Docked with an uncrewed Salyut 6.
9	Progress 9	109	27 April 1980; 06:24	Soyuz-U	Site 1/5	Salyut 6 rear	29 April; 08:09:19	20 May; 18:51:00	22 May; 00:44:00	
10	Progress 10	110	29 June 1980; 04:41	Soyuz-U	Site 1/5	Salyut 6 rear	1 July; 05:53:00	17 July; 22:21:00	19 July; 01:47:00	
11	Progress 11	111	28 September 1980; 15:10	Soyuz-U	Site 1/5	Salyut 6 rear	30 September; 17:03:00	9 December; 10:23:00	11 December; 14:00:00	
12	Progress 12	113	24 January 1981; 14:18	Soyuz-U	Site 1/5	Salyut 6 rear	26 January; 15:56:00	19 March; 18:14:00	20 March; 16:59:00	Docked with an uncrewed Salyut 6. Last Progress flight to Salyut 6.
13	Progress 13	114	23 May 1982; 05:57	Soyuz-U	Site 1/5	Salyut 7	25 May; 07:56:36	4 June; 06:31:00	6 June; 00:05:00	First Progress flight to Salyut 7.
14	Progress 14	117	10 July 1982; 19:58	Soyuz-U	Site 1/5	Salyut 7	12 July; 11:41:00	10 August; 22:11:00	13 August; 01:29:00	
15	Progress 15	112	18 September 1982; 04:59	Soyuz-U	Site 1/5	Salyut 7	20 September; 06:12:00	14 October; 13:46:00	16 October; 17:08:00	
16	Progress 16	115	31 October 1982; 11:20	Soyuz-U	Site 1/5	Salyut 7	2 November; 13:22:00	13 December; 15:32:00	14 December; 17:17:00	
17	Progress 17	119	17 August 1983; 12:08	Soyuz-U	Site 1/5	Salyut 7	19 August; 13:47:00	17 September; 11:44:00	17 September; 23:43:00	
18	Progress 18	118	20 October 1983; 09:59	Soyuz-U	Site 31/6	Salyut 7	22 October; 11:34:00	13 November; 03:08:00	16 November; 04:18:00	
19	Progress 19	120	21 February 1984; 06:46:05	Soyuz-U	Site 31/6	Salyut 7	23 February; 08:21:00	31 March; 09:40:00	1 April; 18:18:00	
20	Progress 20	116	15 April 1984; 08:12:53	Soyuz-U2	Site 31/6	Salyut 7	17 April; 09:22:00	6 May; 17:46:00	7 May; 00:32:51	Delivered parts and tools for the Salyut 7 propulsion system
21	Progress 21	121	7 May 1984; 22:47:15	Soyuz-U	Site 31/6	Salyut 7	10 May; 00:10:00	26 May; 09:41:00	26 May; 15:00:30	Delivered second set of three solar array extensions
22	Progress 22	124	28 May 1984; 14:12:52	Soyuz-U	Site 31/6	Salyut 7	30 May; 15:47:00	15 July; 13:36:00	15 July; 18:52:00	
23	Progress 23	123	14 August 1984; 06:28:15	Soyuz-U	Site 1/5	Salyut 7	16 August; 08:11:00	26 August; 16:13:00	28 August; 01:28:00	
24	Progress 24	125	21 June 1985; 00:39:41	Soyuz-U	Site 1/5	Salyut 7	23 June; 02:54:00	15 July; 12:28:00	15 July; 22:33:31	Delivered replacement parts to help a repair crew rescue Salyut 7, which had lost power and frozen.
25	Kosmos 1669	126	19 July 1985; 13:05:08	Soyuz-U	Site 1/5	Salyut 7	21 July; 15:05:00	28 August; 21:50:00	30 August; 01:20:00	Only Progress flight to have been given a Kosmos designation. Last Progress flight to Salyut 7.
26	Progress 25	127	19 March 1986; 10:08:25	Soyuz-U2	Site 1/5	Mir	21 March; 11:16:02	20 April; 19:24:08	21 April; 00:48:30	First Progress flight to Mir.
27	Progress 26	128	23 April 1986; 19:40:05	Soyuz-U2	Site 1/5	Mir	26 April; 21:26:06	22 June; 18:25:00	23 June; 15:41:01	
28	Progress 27	134	16 January 1987; 06:06:23	Soyuz-U2	Site 1/5	Mir	18 January; 07:26:50	23 February; 11:29:01	25 February; 16:05:00	Docked with an uncrewed Mir.
29	Progress 28	135	3 March 1987; 11:14:05	Soyuz-U2	Site 1/5	Mir; Core aft	5 March; 12:42:36	26 March; 05:06:48	28 March; 03:49:00	Backed away and deployed a large (60 m) antenna for geophysical experiments.
30	Progress 29	136	21 April 1987; 15:14:17	Soyuz-U2	Site 1/5	Mir; Kvant-1 aft	23 April; 17:04:51	11 May; 03:10:01	11 May; 08:28:00	
31	Progress 30	137	19 May 1987; 04:02:10	Soyuz-U2	Site 1/5	Mir	21 May; 05:50:38	19 July; 00:19:51	19 July; 05:42:00	
32	Progress 31	138	3 August 1987; 20:44:11	Soyuz-U2	Site 1/5	Mir	5 August; 22:27:35	21 September; 23:57:41	23 September; 01:02:00	
33	Progress 32	139	23 September 1987; 23:43:54	Soyuz-U2	Site 1/5	Mir	26 September; 01:08:15	10 November; 04:09:10	19 November; 00:58:00	
33	Progress 32	139	23 September 1987; 23:43:54	Soyuz-U2	Site 1/5	Mir	10 November; 05:47	17 November; 19:25	19 November; 00:58:00	
34	Progress 33	140	20 November 1987; 23:47:12	Soyuz-U2	Site 1/5	Mir	23 November; 01:39:13	19 December; 08:15:46	19 December; 13:37:00	
35	Progress 34	142	20 January 1988; 22:51:54	Soyuz-U2	Site 1/5	Mir	23 January; 00:09:09	4 March; 03:40:09	4 March; 07:29:30	
36	Progress 35	143	23 March 1988; 21:05:12	Soyuz-U2	Site 1/5	Mir	25 March; 22:21:35	5 May; 01:36:03	5 May; 06:56:19	
37	Progress 36	144	13 May 1988; 00:30:25	Soyuz-U2	Site 1/5	Mir	15 May; 02:13:26	5 June; 11:11:55	5 June; 21:18:40	
38	Progress 37	145	18 July 1988; 21:13:09	Soyuz-U2	Site 1/5	Mir	20 July; 22:33:40	12 August; 08:31:54	12 August; 13:45:40	
39	Progress 38	146	9 September 1988; 23:33:40	Soyuz-U2	Site 1/5	Mir	12 September; 01:22:28	23 November; 12:12:46	23 November; 19:06:58	
40	Progress 39	147	25 December 1988; 04:11:37	Soyuz-U2	Site 1/5	Mir	27 December; 05:35:10	7 February 1989; 06:45:34	7 February; 13:49:00	Greater than average solar activity hastened the decay of the Mir complex from orbit. The engine and fuel supply of this Progress were used to change Mir's orbital parameters to 340 km by 376 km, from 325 km by 353 km.
41	Progress 40	148	10 February 1989; 08:53:52	Soyuz-U2	Site 1/5	Mir	12 February; 10:29:38	3 March; 01:45:52	5 March; 01:59:00	
42	Progress 41	149	16 March 1989; 18:54:15	Soyuz-U2	Site 1/5	Mir	18 March; 20:50:46	21 April; 01:46:15	25 April; 12:12:00	Carried postcards commemorating the 30th anniversary of Luna 1. A possible main engine failure prevented Progress 41 from making the usual controlled destructive reentry. It underwent uncontrolled reentry .
43	Progress M-1	201	23 August 1989; 03:09:32	Soyuz-U2	Site 1/5	Mir	25 August; 05:19:02	1 December; 09:02:23	1 December; 11:21:00	Docked with an uncrewed Mir.
44	Progress M-2	202	20 December 1989; 03:30:50	Soyuz-U2	Site 1/5	Mir	22 December; 05:41:21	9 February 1990; 02:33:07	9 February; 07:56:00	
45	Progress M-3	203	28 February 1990; 23:10:57	Soyuz-U2	Site 1/5	Mir	3 March; 01:04:32	27 April; 20:24:43	28 April; 00:52:00	
46	Progress 42	150	5 May 1990; 20:44:01	Soyuz-U2	Site 1/5	Mir	7 May; 22:45:03	27 May; 07:08:58	27 May; 12:27:30	
47	Progress M-4	204	15 August 1990; 04:00:41	Soyuz-U2	Site 1/5	Mir	17 August; 05:26:13	17 September; 12:42:43	20 September; 11:42:49	
48	Progress M-5	206	27 September 1990; 10:37:42	Soyuz-U2	Site 1/5	Mir	29 September; 12:26:50	28 November; 06:15:46	28 November; 11:04:05	
49	Progress M-6	205	14 January 1991; 14:50:27	Soyuz-U2	Site 1/5	Mir	16 January; 16:35:25	15 March; 12:46:41	15 March; 18:07:26	
50	Progress M-7	208	19 March 1991; 13:05:15	Soyuz-U2	Site 1/5	Mir	28 March; 12:02:28	6 May; 22:59:36	7 May; 17:20:05	Two docking attempts aborted on 21 and 23 March
51	Progress M-8	207	30 May 1991; 08:04:03	Soyuz-U2	Site 1/5	Mir	1 June; 09:44:37	15 August; 22:16:59	16 August; 06:56:32	
52	Progress M-9	210	20 August 1991; 22:54:10	Soyuz-U2	Site 1/5	Mir	23 August; 00:54:17	30 September; 01:53:00	30 September	
53	Progress M-10	211	17 October 1991; 00:05:25	Soyuz-U2	Site 1/5	Mir	21 October; 03:40:50	20 January 1992; 07:13:44	20 January; 12:03:30	Docking attempt on 19 October aborted
54	Progress M-11	212	25 January 1992; 07:50:17	Soyuz-U2	Site 1/5	Mir	27 January; 09:30:43	13 March; 08:43:40	13 March; 15:47:00	
55	Progress M-12	213	19 April 1992; 21:29:25	Soyuz-U2	Site 1/5	Mir	21 April; 23:21:59	27 June; 21:34:44	28 June; 00:02:51	
56	Progress M-13	214	30 June 1992; 16:43:13	Soyuz-U2	Site 31/6	Mir	4 July; 16:55:13	24 July; 04:14:00	24 July; 08:03:35	Docking attempt on 2 July failed
57	Progress M-14	209	15 August 1992; 22:18:32	Soyuz-U2	Site 31/6	Mir; Kvant-1 aft	18 August; 00:20:48	21 October; 16:46:01	21 October; 23:12:00	Delivered the VDU propulsion unit to Mir
58	Progress M-15	215	27 October 1992; 17:19:41	Soyuz-U2	Site 31/6	Mir	29 October; 19:05:51	4 February 1993; 00:44:53	7 February; 06:43:20	
59	Progress M-16	216	21 February 1993; 18:32:33	Soyuz-U2	Site 1/5	Mir	23 February; 20:17:57	26 March; 06:50:00	27 March; 10:25:00	
59	Progress M-16	216	21 February 1993; 18:32:33	Soyuz-U2	Site 1/5	Mir	26 March; 07:06:03	27 March; 04:21:00	27 March; 10:25:00	
60	Progress M-17	217	31 March 1993; 03:34:13	Soyuz-U2	Site 1/5	Mir; Kvant-1 aft	1 April; 05:16:18	11 August; 15:36:42	3 March 1994; 03:28:00	Conducted docked and undocked spacecraft longevity tests
61	Progress M-18	218	22 May 1993; 06:41:47	Soyuz-U2	Site 1/5	Mir; Core forward	24 May; 08:24:44	3 July; 15:58:16	4 July; 17:13:00	
62	Progress M-19	219	10 August 1993; 22:23:45	Soyuz-U	Site 1/5	Mir; Kvant-1 aft	13 August; 00:00:06	13 October; 17:59:06	19 October; 00:22:14	
63	Progress M-20	220	11 October 1993; 21:33:19	Soyuz-U	Site 1/5	Mir; Kvant-1 aft	13 October; 23:24:46	21 November; 02:38:43	21 November	
64	Progress M-21	221	28 January 1994; 02:12:10	Soyuz-U	Site 1/5	Mir; Kvant-1 aft	30 January; 03:56:13	23 March; 01:20:29	23 March; 05:13:00	
65	Progress M-22	222	22 March 1994; 04:54:12	Soyuz-U	Site 1/5	Mir; Kvant-1 aft	24 March; 06:39:37	23 May; 00:58:38	23 May; 04:40:00	
66	Progress M-23	223	22 May 1994; 04:30:04	Soyuz-U	Site 1/5	Mir; Kvant-1 aft	24 May; 06:18:35	2 July; 08:46:39	2 July; 14:57	
67	Progress M-24	224	25 August 1994; 14:25:12	Soyuz-U	Site 1/5	Mir; Core forward	2 September; 13:30:28	4 October; 18:55:52	4 October; 22:43:00	Failed to dock on 27 and 30 August, second attempt resulted in collision with station
68	Progress M-25	225	11 November 1994; 07:21:58	Soyuz-U	Site 1/5	Mir; Kvant-1 aft	13 November; 09:04:29	16 February 1995; 13:03:00	16 February; 16:45:00	
69	Progress M-26	226	15 February 1995; 16:42:28	Soyuz-U	Site 1/5	Mir; Kvant-1 aft	17 February; 18:21:34	15 March; 02:26:38	15 March; 06:15:00	
70	Progress M-27	227	9 April 1995; 19:34:12	Soyuz-U	Site 1/5	Mir; Core forward	11 April; 21:00:44	22 May; 23:42:37	23 May; 03:27:52	
71	Progress M-28	228	20 July 1995; 03:04:41	Soyuz-U	Site 1/5	Mir; Core forward	22 July; 04:39:37	4 September; 05:09:53	4 September; 08:58:55	
72	Progress M-29	229	8 October 1995; 18:50:40	Soyuz-U	Site 1/5	Mir; Kvant-1 aft	10 October; 20:32:40	19 December; 09:15:05	19 December; 16:15:00	
73	Progress M-30	230	18 December 1995; 14:31:35	Soyuz-U	Site 1/5	Mir	20 December; 16:10:15	22 February 1996; 07:30:02	22 February; 11:02:36	
74	Progress M-31	231	5 May 1996; 07:04:18	Soyuz-U	Site 1/5	Mir; Core forward	7 May; 08:54:19	1 August; 16:44:54	1 August; 20:33:03	
75	Progress M-32	232	31 July 1996; 20:00:06	Soyuz-U	Site 1/5	Mir; Core forward	2 August; 22:03:40	18 August; 09:33:45	20 November; 22:42:25	
75	Progress M-32	232	31 July 1996; 20:00:06	Soyuz-U	Site 1/5	Mir; Kvant-1 aft	3 September; 09:35:00	20 November; 19:51:20	20 November; 22:42:25	
76	Progress M-33	233	19 November 1996; 23:20:38	Soyuz-U	Site 1/5	Mir; Kvant-1 aft	22 November; 01:01:30	6 February 1997; 12:13:53	12 March; 03:23:37	Failed to re-dock on 4 March 1997
77	Progress M-34	234	6 April 1997; 16:04:05	Soyuz-U	Site 1/5	Mir; Kvant-1 aft	8 April; 17:30:03	24 June; 10:22:50	2 July; 06:31:50	Collided with the station during a re-docking attempt on 25 June Spektr permanently depressurised
78	Progress M-35	235	5 July 1997; 04:11:54	Soyuz-U	Site 1/5	Mir	7 July; 05:59:24	6 August; 11:46:45	7 October; 17:23:00	
78	Progress M-35	235	5 July 1997; 04:11:54	Soyuz-U	Site 1/5	Mir	18 August; 12:52:48	7 October; 12:03:49	7 October; 17:23:00	
79	Progress M-36	236	5 October 1997; 15:08:57	Soyuz-U	Site 1/5	Mir; Kvant-1 aft	8 October; 17:07:09	17 December; 06:01:53	19 December; 13:20:01	
80	Progress M-37	237	20 December 1997; 08:45:02	Soyuz-U	Site 1/5	Mir; Kvant-1 aft	22 December; 10:22:20	30 January 1998; 12:00:00	15 March; 23:04:00	
80	Progress M-37	237	20 December 1997; 08:45:02	Soyuz-U	Site 1/5	Mir	23 February; 09:42:28	15 March; 19:16:01	15 March; 23:04:00	
81	Progress M-38	238	14 March 1998; 22:45:55	Soyuz-U	Site 1/5	Mir; Kvant-1 aft	16 March; 22:45	15 May; 18:44	15 May; 21:39:00	Carried the VDU 2 propulsion unit to Mir
82	Progress M-39	239	14 May 1998; 22:12:59	Soyuz-U	Site 1/5	Mir; Kvant-1 aft	16 May; 23:51	12 August; 09:28	29 October; 04:14:52	
82	Progress M-39	239	14 May 1998; 22:12:59	Soyuz-U	Site 1/5	Mir; Kvant-1 aft	1 September; 05:34:40	25 October; 23:03:24	29 October; 04:14:52	
83	Progress M-40	240	25 October 1998; 04:14:57	Soyuz-U	Site 1/5	Mir; Kvant-1 aft	27 October; 05:34:41	4 February 1999; 09:59	5 February; 11:10	Carried the Znamya-2.5 experiment
84	Progress M-41	241	2 April 1999; 11:28:43	Soyuz-U	Site 1/5	Mir; Core forward	4 April; 12:46:49	17 July; 11:20	17 July; 19:51	
85	Progress M-42	242	16 July 1999; 16:37:33	Soyuz-U	Site 1/5	Mir; Kvant-1 aft	18 July; 17:53	2 February 2000; 03:11:52	2 February; 06:10:40	
86	Progress M1-1	250	1 February 2000; 06:47:23	Soyuz-U	Site 1/5	Mir; Kvant-1 aft	3 February; 08:02:20	26 April; 16:33	26 April; 19:27	
87	Progress M1-2	252	25 April 2000; 20:08:02	Soyuz-U	Site 1/5	Mir; Kvant-1 aft	27 April; 21:28	15 October; 18:06	15 October; 23:29	
88	Progress M1-3	251	6 August 2000; 18:26:42	Soyuz-U	Site 1/5	ISS; Zvezda aft	8 August; 20:13	1 November; 04:05	1 November; 07:05	ISS-1P Docked with an uncrewed ISS.
89	Progress M-43	243	16 October 2000; 21:27:06	Soyuz-U	Site 1/5	Mir; Kvant-1 aft	18 October; 21:16	25 January 2001; 05:19	29 January; 01:04	Docked with an uncrewed Mir.
90	Progress M1-4	253	16 November 2000 01:32:36	Soyuz-U	Site 1/5	ISS; Zarya nadir	18 November; 03:48	1 December; 16:23	8 February; 13:50	ISS-2P. The automatic Kurs docking system failed, and the manual backup, TORU, was used for the docking. Following undocking, Progress M1-4 spent 25 days in free flight, prior to redocking with the same port.
90	Progress M1-4	253	16 November 2000 01:32:36	Soyuz-U	Site 1/5	ISS; Zarya nadir	26 December; 10:54	8 February 2001; 11:26	8 February; 13:50	ISS-2P. The automatic Kurs docking system failed, and the manual backup, TORU, was used for the docking. Following undocking, Progress M1-4 spent 25 days in free flight, prior to redocking with the same port.
91	Progress M1-5	254	24 January 2001; 04:28:42	Soyuz-U	Site 1/5	Mir; Kvant-1 aft	27 January; 05:33	N/A	23 March; 05:08	Docked with an uncrewed Mir. Was used to deorbit Mir.
92	Progress M-44	244	26 February 2001; 08:09:35	Soyuz-U	Site 1/5	ISS; Zvezda aft	28 February; 09:47	16 April; 08:48	16 April; 13:23	ISS-3P
93	Progress M1-6	255	20 May 2001; 22:32:40	Soyuz-FG	Site 1/5	ISS; Zvezda aft	23 May; 00:24	22 August; 06:01	22 August; 09:00	ISS-4P
94	Progress M-45	245	21 August 2001; 09:23:54	Soyuz-U	Site 1/5	ISS; Zvezda aft	23 August; 09:51	22 November; 16:12:01	22 November; 21:35:23	ISS-5P
95	Progress DC-1	301	14 September 2001; 23:34:55	Soyuz-U	Site 1/5	ISS; Zvezda nadir (Pirs)	17 September; 01:05	26 September; 15:36	26 September; 22:30	Delivered Pirs module ISS-4R
96	Progress M1-7	256	26 November 2001; 18:24:12	Soyuz-FG	Site 1/5	ISS; Zvezda aft	28 November; 19:43	19 March 2002; 17:43	20 March; 01:27	ISS-6P. Hard docking did not occur until 3 December due to debris on the docking port left by the Kolibri-2000 satellite which Progress M-45 deployed on 19 March at 22:28
97	Progress M1-8	257	21 March 2002; 20:13:39	Soyuz-U	Site 1/5	ISS; Zvezda aft	24 March; 20:57	25 June; 08:26	25 June; 12:26	ISS-7P
98	Progress M-46	246	26 June 2002; 05:36:30	Soyuz-U	Site 1/5	ISS; Zvezda aft	29 June; 06:23	24 September; 13:59	14 October; 10:22	ISS-8P
99	Progress M1-9	258	25 September 2002; 16:58:24	Soyuz-FG	Site 1/5	ISS; Zvezda aft	29 September; 17:00	1 February 2003; 16:00	1 February; 20:00	ISS-9P
100	Progress M-47	247	2 February 2003; 12:59:40	Soyuz-U	Site 1/5	ISS; Zvezda aft	4 February; 14:49	27 August; 22:48	28 August; 02:37	ISS-10P, 100th Progress flight
101	Progress M1-10	259	8 June 2003; 10:34:19	Soyuz-U	Site 1/5	ISS; Pirs nadir	11 June; 11:15	4 September; 19:41	3 October; 12:38	ISS-11P
102	Progress M-48	248	29 August 2003; 01:47:59	Soyuz-U	Site 1/5	ISS; Zvezda aft	31 August; 03:40	28 January 2004; 08:35	28 January; 13:57	ISS-12P
103	Progress M1-11	260	29 January 2004; 11:58:08	Soyuz-U	Site 1/5	ISS; Zvezda aft	31 January; 13:13	24 May; 09:19	3 June; 10:36	ISS-13P
104	Progress M-49	249	25 May 2004; 12:34:23	Soyuz-U	Site 1/5	ISS; Zvezda aft	27 May; 13:54	30 July; 06:04	30 July; 11:23	ISS-14P
105	Progress M-50	350	11 August 2004; 05:03:07	Soyuz-U	Site 1/5	ISS; Zvezda aft	14 August; 05:01	22 December; 19:37	22 December; 23:23	ISS-15P
106	Progress M-51	351	23 December 2004; 22:19:34	Soyuz-U	Site 1/5	ISS; Zvezda aft	25 December; 23:57	27 February 2005; 16:06	9 March; 17:03	ISS-16P
107	Progress M-52	352	28 February 2005; 19:09:18	Soyuz-U	Site 1/5	ISS; Zvezda aft	2 March; 20:10	15 June; 20:16	16 June; 00:02	ISS-17P
108	Progress M-53	353	16 June 2005; 23:09:34	Soyuz-U	Site 1/5	ISS; Zvezda aft	19 June; 00:41	7 September; 10:25	7 September; 14:12	ISS-18P, TORU docking
109	Progress M-54	354	8 September 2005; 13:07:54	Soyuz-U	Site 1/5	ISS; Zvezda aft	10 September; 14:42	3 March 2006; 10:06	3 March; 13:52	ISS-19P
110	Progress M-55	355	21 December 2005; 18:38:20	Soyuz-U	Site 1/5	ISS; Pirs nadir	23 December; 19:46	19 June 2006; 14:06	19 June; 17:53	ISS-20P
111	Progress M-56	356	24 April 2006; 16:03:25	Soyuz-U	Site 1/5	ISS; Zvezda aft	26 April; 17:41	19 September; 00:28	19 September; 04:14	ISS-21P
112	Progress M-57	357	24 June 2006; 15:08:18	Soyuz-U	Site 1/5	ISS; Pirs nadir	26 June; 16:25	16 January 2007; 23:23	17 January; 03:15	ISS-22P
113	Progress M-58	358	23 October 2006; 13:40:36	Soyuz-U	Site 1/5	ISS; Zvezda aft	26 October; 14:28	27 March 2007; 18:11	27 March; 23:30	ISS-23P
114	Progress M-59	359	18 January 2007; 02:12:13	Soyuz-U	Site 1/5	ISS; Pirs nadir	20 January; 01:59	1 August; 14:07	1 August; 19:26	ISS-24P
115	Progress M-60	360	12 May 2007; 03:25:36	Soyuz-U	Site 1/5	ISS; Zvezda aft	15 May; 05:10	19 September; 00:36	25 September; 19:47	ISS-25P
116	Progress M-61	361	2 August 2007; 17:33:47	Soyuz-U	Site 1/5	ISS; Pirs nadir	5 August; 18:40	22 December; 03:59	22 January 2008; 19:51	ISS-26P
117	Progress M-62	362	23 December 2007; 07:12:41	Soyuz-U	Site 1/5	ISS; Pirs nadir	26 December; 08:14	4 February 2008; 10:32	15 February; 13:29	ISS-27P
118	Progress M-63	363	5 February 2008; 13:02:57	Soyuz-U	Site 1/5	ISS; Pirs nadir	7 February; 14:38	7 April; 08:49	7 April; 12:36	ISS-28P
119	Progress M-64	364	14 May 2008; 20:22:56	Soyuz-U	Site 1/5	ISS; Zarya nadir	16 May; 21:39	1 September; 19:46	8 September; 21:33	ISS-29P
120	Progress M-65	365	10 September 2008; 19:50:02	Soyuz-U	Site 1/5	ISS; Zvezda aft	17 September; 18:43	15 November; 16:19	8 December; 08:49	ISS-30P
121	Progress M-01M	401	26 November 2008; 12:38:38	Soyuz-U	Site 1/5	ISS; Pirs nadir	30 November; 12:28	6 February 2009; 04:10	8 February; 08:20	ISS-31P
122	Progress M-66	366	10 February 2009; 05:49:46	Soyuz-U	Site 31/6	ISS; Pirs nadir	13 February; 07:18	6 May; 15:18	18 May; 15:14	ISS-32P
123	Progress M-02M	402	7 May 2009; 18:37:09	Soyuz-U	Site 1/5	ISS; Pirs nadir	12 May; 19:24	30 June; 18:29	13 July; 16:28	ISS-33P
124	Progress M-67	367	24 July 2009; 10:56:56	Soyuz-U	Site 1/5	ISS; Zvezda aft	29 July; 11:12	21 September; 07:25	27 September; 10:19	ISS-34P
125	Progress M-03M	403	15 October 2009; 01:14:37	Soyuz-U	Site 1/5	ISS; Pirs nadir	18 October; 01:40	22 April 2010; 18:32	27 April; 18:07	ISS-35P
126	Progress M-MIM2	302	10 November 2009; 14:22:04	Soyuz-U	Site 1/5	ISS; Zvezda zenith (Poisk)	12 November; 15:41	8 December; 00:16	8 December; 05:27	Delivered Poisk module ISS-5R
127	Progress M-04M	404	3 February 2010; 03:45:29	Soyuz-U	Site 1/5	ISS; Zvezda aft	5 February; 04:26	10 May; 11:16	1 July; 13:54	ISS-36P
128	Progress M-05M	405	28 April 2010; 17:15:09	Soyuz-U	Site 1/5	ISS; Pirs nadir	1 May; 18:30	25 October; 14:22	15 November; 08:50	ISS-37P
129	Progress M-06M	406	30 June 2010; 15:35:14	Soyuz-U	Site 1/5	ISS; Zvezda aft	4 July; 16:17	31 August; 11:22	6 September; 13:13	ISS-38P. First docking attempt on 2 July 2010 failed. Second attempt on 4 July 2010 was successful.
130	Progress M-07M	407	10 September 2010; 10:22:57	Soyuz-U	Site 31/6	ISS; Zvezda aft	12 September; 11:57	20 February 2011; 13:58	20 February; 15:46	ISS-39P
131	Progress M-08M	408	27 October 2010; 15:11:50	Soyuz-U	Site 1/5	ISS; Pirs nadir	30 October; 16:36	24 January 2011; 00:42	24 January; 06:07	ISS-40P
132	Progress M-09M	409	28 January 2011; 01:31:39	Soyuz-U	Site 1/5	ISS; Pirs nadir	30 January; 02:39	22 April; 12:38	26 April; 13:23	ISS-41P
133	Progress M-10M	410	27 April 2011; 13:05:21	Soyuz-U	Site 1/5	ISS; Pirs nadir	29 April; 14:29	29 October; 9:04	29 October; 12:54	ISS-42P
134	Progress M-11M	411	21 June 2011; 14:38:15	Soyuz-U	Site 1/5	ISS; Zvezda aft	23 June; 16:37	23 August; 09:34	1 September	ISS-43P
135	Progress M-12M	412	24 August 2011; 13:00:08	Soyuz-U	Site 1/5	ISS; Zvezda aft	N/A		24 August; 13:25	ISS-44P. Failed to reach orbit due to rocket third stage premature cutoff, impacted in the Choisk Region of Russia's Altai Republic.
136	Progress M-13M	413	30 October 2011; 10:11:12	Soyuz-U	Site 1/5	ISS; Pirs nadir	2 November; 11:41	23 January 2012; 22:10	25 January	ISS-45P
137	Progress M-14M	414	25 January 2012; 23:06:40	Soyuz-U	Site 1/5	ISS; Pirs nadir	28 January; 00:08:57	19 April; 11:04	28 April	ISS-46P
138	Progress M-15M	415	20 April 2012; 12:50:24	Soyuz-U	Site 31/6	ISS; Pirs nadir	22 April; 14:39	22 July; 20:27	20 August	ISS-47P
138	Progress M-15M	415	20 April 2012; 12:50:24	Soyuz-U	Site 31/6	ISS; Pirs nadir	29 July; 01:00	30 July; 21:16	20 August	ISS-47P
139	Progress M-16M	416	1 August 2012; 19:35:13	Soyuz-U	Site 1/5	ISS; Pirs nadir	2 August; 01:18	9 February 2013; 13:12	9 February; 16:19	ISS-48P
140	Progress M-17M	417	31 October 2012; 07:41:18	Soyuz-U	Site 1/5	ISS; Zvezda aft	31 October; 13:33	15 April 2013; 12:02	21 April; 14:59	ISS-49P
141	Progress M-18M	418	11 February 2013; 14:41:47	Soyuz-U	Site 1/5	ISS; Pirs nadir	12 February; 20:35	25 July; 20:43	26 July; 00:42	ISS-50P
142	Progress M-19M	419	24 April 2013; 10:12:16	Soyuz-U	Site 1/5	ISS; Zvezda aft	26 April; 12:25	11 June; 13:58	19 June; 13:39	ISS-51P
143	Progress M-20M	420	27 July 2013; 20:45:08	Soyuz-U	Site 31/6	ISS; Pirs nadir	28 July; 02:26	3 February 2014; 16:21	11 February; 15:55	ISS-52P
144	Progress M-21M	421	25 November 2013; 20:53:00	Soyuz-U	Site 31/6	ISS; Zvezda aft	29 November; 22:30:20	9 June 2014; 12:29	9 June; 17:26	ISS-53P
145	Progress M-22M	422	5 February 2014; 16:23:32	Soyuz-U	Site 1/5	ISS; Pirs nadir	5 February; 22:22:00	7 April; 13:58	18 April; 15:46	ISS-54P
146	Progress M-23M	427	9 April 2014; 15:26:27	Soyuz-U	Site 1/5	ISS; Pirs nadir	9 April; 21:14	21 July; 21:44	31 July; 22:42	ISS-55P
147	Progress M-24M	423	23 July 2014; 21:44:44	Soyuz-U	Site 1/5	ISS; Pirs nadir	24 July, 03:31	27 October; 06:38	19 November; 23:46	ISS-56P
148	Progress M-25M	424	29 October 2014; 07:09:43	Soyuz-2.1a	Site 31/6	ISS; Pirs nadir	29 October; 13:08	25 April 2015; 06:41	26 April; 13:00	ISS-57P
149	Progress M-26M	425	17 February 2015; 11:00:17	Soyuz-U	Site 1/5	ISS; Zvezda aft	17 February; 16:57	14 August; 10:19	14 August; 14:17	ISS-58P
150	Progress M-27M	426	28 April 2015; 07:09:50	Soyuz-2.1a	Site 31/6	ISS; Pirs nadir	Docking attempt cancelled		8 May; 02:04	ISS-59P. Spacecraft damaged during launch and attitude control and telemetry lost shortly after entering orbit. Mission failure with the spacecraft never attempted to dock with the ISS.
151	Progress M-28M	428	3 July 2015; 04:55:48	Soyuz-U	Site 1/5	ISS; Pirs nadir	5 July; 07:11	19 December; 07:35	19 December; 11:28	ISS-60P
152	Progress M-29M	429	1 October 2015; 16:49	Soyuz-U	Site 1/5	ISS; Zvezda aft	1 October; 22:52	30 March 2016; 14:15	8 April; 13:31	ISS-61P
153	Progress MS-01	431	21 December 2015; 08:44:39	Soyuz-2.1a	Site 31/6	ISS; Pirs nadir	23 December; 10:27	2 July 2016; 23:48	3 July; 07:03	ISS-62P
154	Progress MS-02	432	31 March 2016; 16:23:57	Soyuz-2.1a	Site 31/6	ISS; Zvezda aft	2 April; 17:58	14 October; 09:37	14 October	ISS-63P
155	Progress MS-03	433	16 July 2016; 21:41:45	Soyuz-U	Site 31/6	ISS; Pirs nadir	19 July; 00:20	31 January 2017; 14:25	31 January; 17:34	ISS-64P
156	Progress MS-04	434	1 December 2016; 14:51:52	Soyuz-U	Site 1/5	ISS Zvezda aft (Planned)	N/A		1 December (Failed to reach orbit)	ISS-65P. Soyuz third stage anomaly resulting an inconsistent telemetry. Vehicle lost 190 km over Tuva. Failed to reach orbit. Note: This is also the second-to-last flight of Soyuz-U
157	Progress MS-05	435	22 February 2017; 05:58:33	Soyuz-U	Site 1/5	ISS; Pirs nadir	24 February; 08:30	20 July; 12:00	20 July	ISS-66P
158	Progress MS-06	436	14 June 2017; 09:20:13	Soyuz-2.1a	Site 31/6	ISS; Zvezda aft	16 June; 11:37	28 December; 01:03	28 December	ISS-67P
159	Progress MS-07	437	14 October 2017; 08:47	Soyuz-2.1a	Site 31/6	ISS; Pirs nadir	16 October; 11:37	28 March 2018; 13:50	26 April	ISS-68P
160	Progress MS-08	438	13 February 2018; 08:13:33	Soyuz-2.1a	Site 31/6	ISS Zvezda aft	15 February; 10:38	23 August; 02:16	30 August	ISS-69P
161	Progress MS-09	439	9 July 2018; 21:51:33	Soyuz-2.1a	Site 31/6	ISS Pirs nadir	10 July; 01:31	25 January 2019; 12:55	25 January	ISS-70P. It took just 3 hours and 40 minutes to dock the spacecraft to the ISS after the rocket's launch.
162	Progress MS-10	440	16 November 2018; 18:14:08	Soyuz-FG	Site 31/6	ISS Zvezda aft	18 November; 19:28	4 June 2019; 08:40	4 June	ISS-71P
163	Progress MS-11	441	4 April 2019; 11:01:35	Soyuz-FG	Site 31/6	ISS Pirs nadir	4 April; 14:25	29 July; 10:44	29 July	ISS-72P
164	Progress MS-12	442	31 July 2019; 12:10:46	Soyuz-2.1a	Site 31/6	ISS Pirs nadir	31 July; 15:29	29 November; 10:25	29 November; 14:19	ISS-73P
165	Progress MS-13	443	6 December 2019 09:34:11	Soyuz-2.1a	Site 31/6	ISS Pirs nadir	9 December; 10:35:11	8 July 2020; 18:22:00	8 July; 22:05	ISS-74P
166	Progress MS-14	448	25 April 2020; 01:51:41	Soyuz-2.1a	Site 31/6	ISS Zvezda aft	25 April; 05:12:00	27 April 2021; 23:11:00	29 April; 00:42	ISS-75P
167	Progress MS-15	444	23 July 2020; 14:26:22	Soyuz-2.1a	Site 31/6	ISS Pirs nadir	23 July 17:45:00	9 February 2021; 05:21:00	9 February; 09:13	ISS-76P
168	Progress MS-16	445	15 February 2021; 04:45:06	Soyuz-2.1a	Site 31/6	ISS Pirs nadir/ ISS Zvezda nadir	17 February; 06:27:00	26 July; 10:55:00 with Pirs	26 July; 14:51 with Pirs	ISS-77P removed Pirs ISS-4R from ISS
169	Progress MS-17	446	30 June 2021; 23:27:20	Soyuz-2.1a	Site 31/6	ISS Poisk zenith	2 July; 00:59:00	20 October; 23:42:00 with Nauka nadir port passive docking adapter	25 November; 14:34 with Nauka nadir port passive docking adapter	ISS-78P removed Nauka Module nadir port passive docking adapter from ISS
169	Progress MS-17	446	30 June 2021; 23:27:20	Soyuz-2.1a	Site 31/6	ISS Nauka nadir	22 October; 04:21:00	25 November; 11:22:00 with Nauka nadir port passive docking adapter	25 November; 14:34 with Nauka nadir port passive docking adapter	ISS-78P removed Nauka Module nadir port passive docking adapter from ISS
170	Progress MS-18	447	28 October 2021; 00:00:32	Soyuz-2.1a	Site 31/6	ISS Zvezda aft	30 October; 01:31:00	1 June 2022; 08:03	1 June; 11:51	ISS-79P, Delivered LCCS part of MLM Means of Attachment of Large payloads to ISS
171	Progress M-UM	303	24 November 2021; 13:06:35	Soyuz-2.1b	Site 31/6	ISS Nauka nadir (Prichal)	26 November; 15:19:00	22 December; 23:03:00	23 December; 04:30:54	Delivered Prichal module ISS-6R
172	Progress MS-19	449	15 February 2022; 04:25:40	Soyuz-2.1a	Site 31/6	ISS Poisk zenith	17 February; 07:03:20	23 October; 22:45:34	24 October; 01:51	ISS-80P
173	Progress MS-20	450	3 June 2022; 09:03	Soyuz-2.1a	Site 31/6	ISS Zvezda aft	3 June; 13:02	7 February 2023; 05:01	7 February; 08:37	ISS-81P
174	Progress MS-21	451	26 October 2022; 00:20	Soyuz-2.1a	Site 31/6	ISS Poisk zenith	28 October; 02:49	18 February 2023; 02:26	19 February; 03:15	ISS-82P
175	Progress MS-22	452	9 February 2023; 06:15	Soyuz-2.1a	Site 31/6	ISS Zvezda aft	11 February; 08:45	20 August; 23:50	21 August; 02:58	ISS-83P
176	Progress MS-23	453	24 May 2023; 12:56	Soyuz-2.1a	Site 31/6	ISS Poisk zenith	24 May; 16:19	29 November; 07:55	29 November; 11:02	ISS-84P
177	Progress MS-24	454	23 August 2023; 01:08	Soyuz-2.1a	Site 31/6	ISS Zvezda aft	25 August; 03:50	13 February 2024; 02:09	13 February; 05:16	ISS-85P
178	Progress MS-25	455	1 December 2023; 09:25	Soyuz-2.1a	Site 31/6	ISS Poisk zenith	3 December; 11:18	28 May 2024; 08:39	29 May; 11:48	ISS-86P
179	Progress MS-26	456	15 February 2024; 03:25	Soyuz-2.1a	Site 31/6	ISS Zvezda aft	17 February; 06:06	13 August; 02:00	13 August; 05:49	ISS-87P
180	Progress MS-27	457	30 May 2024; 09:43	Soyuz-2.1a	Site 31/6	ISS Poisk zenith	1 June; 11:43	19 November; 12:53	19 November; 16:51	ISS-88P
181	Progress MS-28	458	15 August 2024; 03:20:17	Soyuz-2.1a	Site 31/6	ISS Zvezda aft	17 August; 05:53	25 February 2025; 20:17:33	25 February; 23:23	ISS-89P
182	Progress MS-29	459	21 November 2024; 12:22:23	Soyuz-2.1a	Site 31/6	ISS Poisk zenith	23 November; 14:31:16	1 July 2025; 18:43	1 July; 22:30	ISS-90P
183	Progress MS-30	460	27 February 2025; 21:24:27	Soyuz-2.1a	Site 31/6	ISS Zvezda aft	1 March; 23:02:30	9 September 2025; 15:45:30	9 September 2025; 19:59	ISS-91P
184	Progress MS-31	461	3 July 2025; 19:32	Soyuz-2.1a	Site 31/6	ISS Poisk zenith	5 July; 21:27	16 March 2026; 13:24	16 March; 17:21	ISS-92P
185	Progress MS-32	462	11 September 2025; 15:54:06	Soyuz-2.1a	Site 31/6	ISS Zvezda aft	13 September 2025; 17:23	20 April 2026; 22:08:30	21 April 2026; 02:05	ISS-93P
186	Progress MS-33	463	22 March 2026; 11:59:51	Soyuz-2.1a	Site 31/6	ISS Poisk zenith	24 March 2026; 13:40:47	7 September 2026; 15:18	7 September 2026; 18:27	ISS-94P

=== Current spaceflights ===
This is a list of current spaceflights to the International Space Station.

No.	Spacecraft	S/N	Launch (UTC)	Carrier rocket	Launch pad	Docking			Deorbit (UTC)	Remarks
No.	Spacecraft	S/N	Launch (UTC)	Carrier rocket	Launch pad	Station/ port	Docking (UTC)	Undocking (UTC)	Deorbit (UTC)	Remarks
187	Progress MS-34	464	25 April 2026; 22:21:47	Soyuz-2.1a	Site 31/6	ISS Zvezda aft	28 April 2026; 00:00:46	22 November 2026 (planned)	22 November 2026 (planned)	ISS-95P
188	Progress MS-35	465	16 September 2026; 13:33	Soyuz-2.1b	Site 31/6	ISS Poisk zenith	19 September 2026; 13:44	February 2027 (planned)	February 2027 (planned)	ISS-96P
189	Progress MS-36	466	24 November 2026; 09:03 (planned)	Soyuz-2.1b	Site 31/6	ISS Zvezda aft	26 November 2026 (planned)	2027 (planned)	2027 (planned)	ISS-97P
190	Progress MS-37	467	February 2027 (planned)	Soyuz-2.1b	Site 31/6	ISS Poisk zenith	February 2027 (planned)	2027 (planned)	2027 (planned)	ISS-98P

== See also ==
- List of Soviet human spaceflight missions, with all Soviet Vostok, Voskhod, and Soyuz missions
- List of Russian human spaceflight missions, with all Russian Soyuz missions
- List of human spaceflights to Mir
- List of uncrewed spaceflights to Mir
- List of human spaceflights to the International Space Station
- Uncrewed spaceflights to the International Space Station
