= Progress M-17 =

Russian cargo spacecraft

- Mission type: Mir resupply
- COSPAR ID: 1993-019A
- SATCAT no.: 22588

Spacecraft properties
- Spacecraft type: Progress-M 11F615A55
- Manufacturer: NPO Energia
- Launch mass: 7,250 kilograms (15,980 lb)

Start of mission
- Launch date: 31 March 1993, 03:34:13 UTC
- Rocket: Soyuz-U2
- Launch site: Baikonur Site 1/5

End of mission
- Disposal: Deorbited
- Decay date: 3 March 1994, 03:28 UTC

Orbital parameters
- Reference system: Geocentric
- Regime: Low Earth
- Perigee altitude: 391 kilometres (243 mi)
- Apogee altitude: 391 kilometres (243 mi)
- Inclination: 51.6 degrees

Docking with Mir
- Docking port: Kvant-1 Aft
- Docking date: 1 April 1993, 05:16:18 UTC
- Undocking date: 11 August 1993, 15:36:42 UTC
- Time docked: 132 days
- Progress Mir Resupply

Progress M-17 (Russian: Прогресс М-17) was a Russian uncrewed cargo spacecraft which was launched in 1993 to resupply the Mir space station. The thirty-fifth of sixty-four Progress spacecraft to visit Mir, it used the Progress-M 11F615A55 configuration, and had the serial number 217. In addition to delivering cargo, Progress M-17 was also used to demonstrate extended duration Progress missions; remaining in orbit for almost a year with a docked phase lasting 132 days.

== Launch and docking ==
Progress M-17 was launched at 03:34:13 GMT on 31 March 1993, atop a Soyuz-U2 carrier rocket flying from Site 1/5 at the Baikonur Cosmodrome. It docked with the aft port of the Kvant-1 module at 05:16:18 GMT on 1 April, less than 26 hours after launch. The rocket had the serial number N15000-069.

The spacecraft carried supplies including food, water and oxygen for the EO-13 and EO-14 crews aboard Mir, as well as equipment for conducting scientific research, and fuel for adjusting the station's orbit and performing manoeuvres. In all, Progress M-17 delivered 2,604 kilograms (5,741 lb) of cargo to Mir. It carried the seventh VBK-Raduga recoverable capsule, however due to the extended duration mission this was returned by Progress M-18.

== Extended mission ==
Progress M-17 was originally scheduled to conduct a normal length mission, however it remained docked with Mir for 132 days because of a longer than usual gap between missions requiring its docking port. Soyuz TM-16 had docked with the Kristall module in order to test the APAS-89 docking system ahead of its use in the Shuttle-Mir programme, leaving the forward port free for Progress M-18, whose docking marked the first time two Progress spacecraft had been docked to a station simultaneously. It undocked from Mir at 15:36:42 GMT on 11 August.

Due to its extended mission, the spacecraft did not have sufficient fuel remaining to deorbit, and it was therefore kept in orbit for 205 days of free flight, until its orbit had decayed sufficiently for a deorbit burn to be conducted with what fuel remained. During this time, Progress M-17 was used for further tests of the spacecraft's longevity. After being manoeuvred into an orbit away from the station, its systems were deactivated and it was kept in a low-power configuration. On 2 March the spacecraft was reactivated and successfully completed a series of manoeuvres to prove that it could still operate after having been in orbit for so long. The next day, Progress M-17 was deorbited and reentered the atmosphere over the South America, breaking up at around 03:28 GMT.

== See also ==
- 1993 in spaceflight
- 1994 in spaceflight
- List of Progress flights
- List of uncrewed spaceflights to Mir
