= List of uncrewed spaceflights to Mir =

This is a list of uncrewed spaceflights to Mir. Components of the space station are indicated in green.

Spacecraft	Mission	Carrier rocket	Launch (UTC)	Port	Docked (UTC)	Undocked (UTC)	Time docked	Deorbit (UTC)	Remarks
Mir Core	Module	Proton-K	19 February 1986; 21:28	N/A			15 y, 31 d, 8 h, 31 m^{[A]}^{[B]}	23 March 2001; 05:07^{[C]}	
Progress 25	Logistics	Soyuz-U2	19 March 1986; 10:08	Core +X	21 March 1986; 11:16	20 April 1986; 19:24	30 d, 8 h, 8 m	21 April 1986; 00:00	
Progress 26	Logistics	Soyuz-U2	23 April 1986; 19:40	Core +X	26 April 1986; 21:26	22 June 1986; 18:25	56 d, 20 h, 59 m	23 June 1986; 18:41	
Soyuz TM-1	Test	Soyuz-U2	21 May 1986; 08:21	Core -X	23 May 1986; 10:11	29 May 1986; 09:22	5 d, 23 h, 11 m	30 May 1986; 04:26	
Progress 27	Logistics	Soyuz-U2	16 January 1987; 06:06	Core +X	18 January 1987; 07:26	23 February 1987; 11:29	36 d, 4 h, 3 m	25 February 1987; 15:16	Docked with an uncrewed Mir.
Progress 28	Logistics	Soyuz-U2	3 March 1987; 11:14	Core +X	5 March 1987; 12:42	26 March 1987; 05:06	22 d, 16 h, 24 m	27 March 1987; 03:01	
Kvant-1	Module	Proton-K	31 March 1987; 00:06	Core +X	9 April 1987; 00:35	N/A	13 y, 348 d, 5 h, 24 m^{[A]}	23 March 2001; 05:07^{[C]}	
Kvant FSM	Delivery tug	Proton-K	31 March 1987; 00:06	Core +X	9 April 1987; 00:35	12 April 1987; 20:18	3 d, 19 h, 43 m	25 August 1988^{[D]}	
Progress 29	Logistics	Soyuz-U2	21 April 1987; 15:14	Kvant-1	23 April 1987; 17:04	11 May 1987; 03:10	17 d, 10 h, 6 m	11 May 1987; 07:51	
Progress 30	Logistics	Soyuz-U2	19 May 1987; 04:02	Kvant-1	21 May 1987; 05:50	19 July 1987; 00:19	58 d, 23 h, 10 m	19 July 1987; 05:00	
Progress 31	Logistics	Soyuz-U2	3 August 1987; 20:44	Kvant-1	5 August 1987; 22:27	21 September 1987; 23:57	47 d, 1 h, 30 m	23 September 1987; 00:22	
Progress 32	Logistics	Soyuz-U2	23 September 1987; 23:43	Kvant-1	26 September 1987; 01:08	10 November 1987; 04:09	46 d, 3 h, 1 m	19 November 1987; 00:10	
Progress 32	Logistics	Soyuz-U2	23 September 1987; 23:43	Kvant-1	10 November 1987; 05:47	17 November 1987; 19:24	7 d, 13 h, 37 m	19 November 1987; 00:10	
Progress 33	Logistics	Soyuz-U2	20 November 1987; 23:47	Kvant-1	23 November 1987; 01:39	19 December 1987; 08:15	29 d, 6 h, 36 m	19 December 1987; 12:56	
Progress 34	Logistics	Soyuz-U2	20 January 1988; 22:51	Kvant-1	23 January 1988; 00:09	4 March 1988; 03:40	41 d, 3 h, 31 m	4 March 1988; 06:45	
Progress 35	Logistics	Soyuz-U2	23 March 1988; 21:05	Kvant-1	25 March 1988; 22:21	5 May 1988; 01:36	40 d, 3 h, 15 m	5 May 1988; 06:01	
Progress 36	Logistics	Soyuz-U2	13 May 1988; 00:30	Kvant-1	15 May 1988; 02:13	5 June 1988; 11:11	27 d, 8 h, 58 m	5 June 1988; 20:28	
Progress 37	Logistics	Soyuz-U2	18 July 1988; 21:13	Kvant-1	20 July 1988; 22:33	12 August 1988; 08:31	22 d, 9 h, 58 m	12 August 1988; 12:51	
Progress 38	Logistics	Soyuz-U2	9 September 1988; 23:33	Kvant-1	12 September 1988; 01:22	23 November 1988; 12:12	72 d, 10 h, 50 m	23 November 1988; 18:26	
Progress 39	Logistics	Soyuz-U2	25 December 1988; 04:11	Kvant-1	27 December 1988; 05:35	7 February 1989; 06:45	42 d, 1 h, 10 m	7 February 1989; 12:49	
Progress 40	Logistics	Soyuz-U2	10 February 1989; 08:53	Kvant-1	12 February 1989; 10:29	3 March 1989; 01:45	18 d, 15 h, 16 m	5 March 1989; 01:08	
Progress 41	Logistics	Soyuz-U2	16 March 1989; 18:54	Kvant-1	18 March 1989; 20:50	21 April 1989; 01:46	33 d, 4 h, 56 m	25 April 1989^{[D]}	Ran out of fuel before deorbiting
Progress M-1	Logistics	Soyuz-U2	23 August 1989; 03:09	Core -X	25 August 1989; 05:19	1 December 1989; 09:02	98 d, 3 h, 43 m	1 December 1989; 10:32	
Kvant-2	Module	Proton-K	26 November 1989; 13:01	Core -X	6 December 1989; 12:21	8 December 1989; 07:19	1 d, 19 h, 2 m	23 March 2001; 05:07^{[C]}	
Kvant-2	Module	Proton-K	26 November 1989; 13:01	Core +Y	8 December 1989; 08:19	N/A	11 y, 104 d, 21 h, 40 m^{[A]}	23 March 2001; 05:07^{[C]}	
Progress M-2	Logistics	Soyuz-U2	20 December 1989; 03:30	Kvant-1	22 December 1989; 05:41	9 February 1990; 02:33	47 d, 20 h, 52 m	9 February 1990; 07:97	
Progress M-3	Logistics	Soyuz-U2	28 February 1990; 23:10	Kvant-1	3 March 1990; 01:04	27 April 1990; 20:24	55 d, 19 h, 20 m	28 April 1990; 00:00	
Progress 42	Logistics	Soyuz-U2	5 May 1990; 20:44	Kvant-1	7 May 1990; 22:45	27 May 1990; 07:08	19 d, 8 h, 23 m	27 May 1990; 11:40	
Kristall	Module	Proton-K	31 May 1990; 10:33	Core -X	10 June 1990; 10:47	11 June 1990	1 d	23 March 2001; 05:07^{[C]}	
Kristall	Module	Proton-K	31 May 1990; 10:33	Core -Y	11 June 1990	26 May 1995; 23:07	5 y, 349 d	23 March 2001; 05:07^{[C]}	
Kristall	Module	Proton-K	31 May 1990; 10:33	Core -X	27 May 1995; 00:36	29 May 1995	2 d	23 March 2001; 05:07^{[C]}	
Kristall	Module	Proton-K	31 May 1990; 10:33	Core -Z	29 May 1995	10 June 1995	12 d	23 March 2001; 05:07^{[C]}	
Kristall	Module	Proton-K	31 May 1990; 10:33	Core -X	10 June 1995	17 July 1995; 02:51	37 d	23 March 2001; 05:07^{[C]}	
Kristall	Module	Proton-K	31 May 1990; 10:33	Core -Z	17 July 1995; 04:20	N/A	5 y, 249 d, 1 h, 39 m^{[A]}	23 March 2001; 05:07^{[C]}	
Progress M-4	Logistics	Soyuz-U2	15 August 1990; 04:00	Core -X	17 August 1990; 05:26	17 September 1990; 12:42	31 d, 7 h, 16 m	20 September 1990; 11:04	
Progress M-5	Logistics	Soyuz-U2	27 September 1990; 10:37	Core -X	29 September 1990; 12:26	28 November 1990; 06:15	59 d, 17 h, 49 m	28 November 1990; 10:24	Carried VBK-Raduga
Progress M-6	Logistics	Soyuz-U2	14 January 1991; 14:50	Kvant-1	16 January 1991; 16:35	15 March 1991; 12:46	57 d, 20 h, 11 m	15 March 1991; 17:14	
Progress M-7	Logistics	Soyuz-U2	19 March 1991; 13:05	Core -X	28 March 1991; 12:02	6 May 1991; 22:59	39 d, 10 h, 57 m	7 May 1991; 16:24	First docking attempt with Kvant-1 failed. Carried VBK-Raduga, recovery failed.
Progress M-8	Logistics	Soyuz-U2	30 May 1991; 08:04	Core -X	1 June 1991; 09:44	15 August 1991; 22:16	75 d, 12 h, 32 m	16 August 1991	
Progress M-9	Logistics	Soyuz-U2	10 August 1991; 22:54	Core -X	23 August 1991; 00:54	30 September 1991; 01:53	38 d, 59 m	30 September 1991; 07:45	Carried VBK-Raduga
Progress M-10	Logistics	Soyuz-U2	17 October 1991; 00:05	Core -X	21 October 1991; 03:40	20 January 1992; 07:13	91 d, 3 h, 33 m	20 January 1992	Carried VBK-Raduga
Progress M-11	Logistics	Soyuz-U2	25 January 1992; 07:50	Core -X	27 January 1992; 09:30	13 March 1992; 08:43	45 d, 23 h, 13 m	13 March 1992	
Progress M-12	Logistics	Soyuz-U2	19 April 1992; 21:29	Core -X	21 April 1992; 23:21	27 June 1992; 21:34	66 d, 22 h, 13 m	27 June 1992	
Progress M-13	Logistics	Soyuz-U2	30 June 1992; 16:43	Core -X	4 July 1992; 16:55	24 July 1992; 04:14	19 d, 11 h, 19 m	24 July 1992	
Progress M-14	Logistics	Soyuz-U2	15 August 1992; 22:18	Kvant-1	18 August 1992; 00:20	21 October 1992; 16:46	64 d, 16 h, 26 m	21 October 1992	Carried VBK-Raduga
Progress M-15	Logistics	Soyuz-U2	27 October 1992; 17:19	Kvant-1	29 October 1992; 19:05	7 February 1993; 00:44	100 d, 5 h, 39 m	7 February 1993	
Progress M-16	Logistics	Soyuz-U2	21 February 1993; 18:32	Kvant-1	23 February 1993; 20:17	26 March 1993; 06:50	30 d, 10 h, 33 m	27 March 1993; 10:25	
Progress M-16	Logistics	Soyuz-U2	21 February 1993; 18:32	Kvant-1	26 March 1993; 07:06	27 March 1993; 04:21	21 h, 15 m	27 March 1993; 10:25	
Progress M-17	Logistics	Soyuz-U2	31 March 1993; 03:34	Kvant-1	1 April 1993; 05:16	11 August 1993; 15:36	132 d, 10 h, 20 m	3 March 1994^{[D]}	Carried VBK-Raduga, returned by Progress M-18
Progress M-18	Logistics	Soyuz-U2	22 May 1993; 06:41	Core -X	24 May 1993; 08:34	3 July 1993; 15:58	40 d, 7 h, 24 m	4 July 1993	Returned VBK-Raduga launched on Progress M-17
Progress M-19	Logistics	Soyuz-U	10 August 1993; 22:23	Kvant-1	13 August 1993; 00:00	12 October 1993; 17:59	60 d, 17 h, 59 m	12 October 1993	Carried VBK-Raduga
Progress M-20	Logistics	Soyuz-U	11 October 1993; 21:33	Kvant-1	13 October 1993; 23:24	21 November 1993; 02:38	38 d, 3 h, 14 m	21 November 1993	Carried VBK-Raduga
Progress M-21	Logistics	Soyuz-U	28 January 1994; 02:12	Kvant-1	30 January 1994; 03:56	23 March 1994; 01:20	51 d, 21 h, 24 m	23 March 1994; 04:23	
Progress M-22	Logistics	Soyuz-U	22 March 1994; 04:54	Kvant-1	24 March 1994; 06:39	23 May 1994; 00:58	59 d, 18 h, 19 m	23 May 1994	
Progress M-23	Logistics	Soyuz-U	22 May 1994; 04:30	Kvant-1	24 May 1994; 06:18	2 July 1994; 08:46	39 d, 2 h, 28 m	2 July 1994; 14:44	Carried VBK-Raduga
Progress M-24	Logistics	Soyuz-U	25 August 1994; 14:25	Core -X	2 September 1994; 13:30	4 October 1994; 18:55	32 d, 5 h, 25 m	4 October 1994; 21:44	First docking attempt failed, collided with station during second attempt
Progress M-25	Logistics	Soyuz-U	11 November 1994; 07:21	Kvant-1	13 November 1994; 09:04	16 February 1995; 13:03	95 d, 3 h, 59 m	16 February 1995; 16:06	
Progress M-26	Logistics	Soyuz-U	15 February 1995; 16:48	Kvant-1	17 February 1995; 18:21	15 March 1995; 02:26	25 d, 8 h, 5 m	15 March 1995; 05:28	
Progress M-27	Logistics	Soyuz-U	9 April 1995; 19:34	Core -X	11 April 1996; 21:00	22 May 1996; 23:42	41 d, 2 h, 42 m	23 May 1996; 02:40	
Spektr	Module	Proton-K	20 May 1995; 03:33	Core -X	1 June 1995; 00:56	3 June 1995; 19:53	2 d, 18 h, 57 m	23 March 2001; 05:07^{[C]}	
Spektr	Module	Proton-K	20 May 1995; 03:33	Core -Y	3 June 1995	N/A	5 y, 293 d^{[A]}	23 March 2001; 05:07^{[C]}	
Progress M-28	Logistics	Soyuz-U	20 July 1995; 03:04	Core -X	22 July 1995; 05:39	4 September 1995; 05:09	43 d, 23 h, 30 m	4 September 1995	
Progress M-29	Logistics	Soyuz-U	8 October 1995; 18:50	Kvant-1	10 October 1995; 20:32	19 December 1995; 09:15	71 d, 12 h, 43 m	19 December 1995; 15:26	
Progress M-30	Logistics	Soyuz-U	18 December 1995; 14:31	Kvant-1	20 December 1995; 16:10	22 February 1996; 07:24	63 d, 15 h, 14 m	22 February 1996; 11:02	
Priroda	Module	Proton-K	23 April 1996; 11:48	Core -X	26 April 1996; 12:42	27 April 1996; 08:32	19 h, 50 m	23 March 2001; 05:07^{[C]}	
Priroda	Module	Proton-K	23 April 1996; 11:48	Core +Z	27 April 1996; 10:06	N/A	4 y, 329 d, 19 h, 53 m^{[A]}	23 March 2001; 05:07^{[C]}	
Progress M-31	Logistics	Soyuz-U	5 May 1996; 07:04	Core -X	7 May 1996; 08:54	1 August 1996; 16:44	86 d, 8 h, 40 m	1 August 1996; 19:44	
Progress M-32	Logistics	Soyuz-U	21 July 1996; 20:00	Core -X	2 August 1996; 22:03	18 August 1996; 09:33	15 d, 11 h, 30 m	20 November 1996; 22:42	
Progress M-32	Logistics	Soyuz-U	21 July 1996; 20:00	Kvant-1	3 September 1996; 09:35	20 November 1996; 19:51	78 d, 10 h, 16 m	20 November 1996; 22:42	
Progress M-33	Logistics	Soyuz-U	19 November 1996; 23:20	Kvant-1	22 November 1996; 01:01	6 February 1997; 12:13	76 d, 11 h, 12 m	12 March 1997; 02:35	Redocking attempt on 4 March 1997 failed
Progress M-34	Logistics	Soyuz-U	6 April 1997; 16:04	Kvant-1	8 April 1997; 17:30	24 June 1997; 10:22	78 d, 16 h, 52 m	2 July 1997; 05:34	Collided with Spektr during redocking attempt on 25 June, resulting in permanent depressurisation of module
Progress M-35	Logistics	Soyuz-U	5 July 1997; 04:11	Kvant-1	7 July 1997; 05:59	6 August 1997; 11:46	30 d, 5 h, 47 m	7 October 1997; 16:41	
Progress M-35	Logistics	Soyuz-U	5 July 1997; 04:11	Kvant-1	18 August 1997; 12:52	7 October 1997; 12:03	49 d, 23 h, 11 m	7 October 1997; 16:41	
Progress M-36	Logistics	Soyuz-U	5 October 1997; 15:08	Kvant-1	8 October 1997; 17:07	17 December 1997; 06:01	69 d, 12 h, 54 m	19 December 1997; 13:20	
Progress M-37	Logistics	Soyuz-U	20 December 1997; 08:45	Kvant-1	22 December 1997; 10:22	30 January 1998; 12:53	39 d, 2 h, 31 m	15 March 1998; 22:14	
Progress M-37	Logistics	Soyuz-U	20 December 1997; 08:45	Kvant-1	23 February 1998; 09:42	15 March 1998; 19:16	20 d, 9 h, 34 m	15 March 1998; 22:14	
Progress M-38	Logistics	Soyuz-U	14 March 1998; 22:45	Kvant-1	17 March 1998; 00:31	15 May 1998; 18:43	59 d, 18 h, 12 m	15 May 1998; 21:39	
Progress M-39	Logistics	Soyuz-U	14 May 1998; 22:12	Kvant-1	16 May 1998; 23:50	12 August 1998; 09:28	87 d, 9 h, 38 m	29 October 1998; 03:27	
Progress M-39	Logistics	Soyuz-U	14 May 1998; 22:12	Kvant-1	1 September 1998; 05:34	27 October 1998; 23:03	56 d, 17 h, 49 m	29 October 1998; 03:27	
Progress M-40	Logistics	Soyuz-U	25 October 1998; 04:14	Kvant-1	27 October 1998; 05:34	4 February 1999; 09:59	100 d, 4 h, 25 m	5 February 1999; 10:16	
Progress M-41	Logistics	Soyuz-U	2 April 1999; 11:28	Kvant-1	4 April 1999; 12:46	17 July 1999; 11:24	103 d, 22 h, 38 m	17 July 1999	
Progress M-42	Logistics	Soyuz-U	16 July 1999; 16:37	Kvant-1	18 July 1999; 17:53	2 February 2000; 03:11	198 d, 9 h, 18 m	2 February 2000; 06:10	
Progress M1-1	Logistics	Soyuz-U	1 February 2000; 06:47	Kvant-1	3 February 2000; 08:02	26 April 2000; 16:32	83 d, 8 h, 30 m	26 April 2000; 19:26	Docked with an uncrewed Mir.
Progress M1-2	Logistics	Soyuz-U	25 April 2000; 20:08	Kvant-1	27 April 2000; 21:28	15 October 2000; 18:06	170 d, 20 h, 38 m	16 October 2000	
Progress M-43	Logistics	Soyuz-U	16 October 2000; 21:27	Kvant-1	20 October 2000; 21:16	27 January 2001; 05:19	98 d, 8 h, 3 m	29 January 2001; 02:12	Docked with an uncrewed Mir.
Progress M1-5	Deorbit Tug	Soyuz-U	24 January 2001; 04:28	Kvant-1	27 January 2001; 05:33	N/A	55 d, 26 m^{[A]}	23 March 2001; 05:07^{[C]}	Docked with an uncrewed Mir. Was used to deorbit Mir

- A. ^{1} ^{2} ^{3} ^{4} ^{5} ^{6} ^{7} - Time from docking until debris impact in the Pacific Ocean at approximately 05:59 GMT on 23 March 2001.
- B. ^{1} - From time of launch
- C. ^{1} ^{2} ^{3} ^{4} ^{5} ^{6} ^{7} - Remained attached during deorbit of space station on 23 March 2001.
- D. ^{1} ^{2} ^{3} - Decayed naturally

== See also ==
- Mir
- List of Progress flights
- List of human spaceflights to Mir
- List of human spaceflights to the International Space Station
- Uncrewed spaceflights to the International Space Station
- List of Mir spacewalks
