= Progress M-6 =

1991 Soviet uncrewed cargo spacecraft

- Mission type: Mir resupply
- COSPAR ID: 1991-002A
- SATCAT no.: 21053

Spacecraft properties
- Spacecraft type: Progress-M 11F615A55
- Manufacturer: NPO Energia
- Launch mass: 7,250 kilograms (15,980 lb)

Start of mission
- Launch date: 14 January 1991, 14:50:27 UTC
- Rocket: Soyuz-U2
- Launch site: Baikonur Site 1/5

End of mission
- Disposal: Deorbited
- Decay date: 15 March 1991, 18:07:26 UTC

Orbital parameters
- Reference system: Geocentric
- Regime: Low Earth
- Perigee altitude: 358 kilometres (222 mi)
- Apogee altitude: 388 kilometres (241 mi)
- Inclination: 51.6 degrees

Docking with Mir
- Docking port: Kvant-1 Aft
- Docking date: 16 January 1991, 16:35:25 UTC
- Undocking date: 15 March 1991, 12:46:41 UTC
- Time docked: 58 days

Progress M-6 (Russian: Прогресс М-6) was a Soviet uncrewed cargo spacecraft which was launched in 1991 to resupply the Mir space station. The twenty-fourth of sixty four Progress spacecraft to visit Mir, it used the Progress-M 11F615A55 configuration, and had the serial number 205. It carried supplies including food, water and oxygen for the EO-8 crew aboard Mir, as well as equipment for conducting scientific research, and fuel for adjusting the station's orbit and performing manoeuvres.

Progress M-6 was launched at 14:50:27 GMT on 14 January 1991, on a Soyuz-U2 carrier rocket flying from Site 1/5 at the Baikonur Cosmodrome. Following two days of free flight, it docked with the aft port of the Kvant-1 module of Mir at 16:35:25 GMT on 16 January.

During the 58 days for which Progress M-6 was docked with it, Mir was in an orbit of around 358 by 388 kilometres (193 by 210 nmi), inclined at 51.6 degrees. Progress M-6 undocked from Mir at 12:46:41 GMT on 15 March, and was deorbited a few hours later at 17:14:00. It burned up in the atmosphere over the Pacific Ocean at around 18:07:26.

== See also ==
- 1991 in spaceflight
- List of Progress flights
- List of uncrewed spaceflights to Mir
