= Progress 26 =

Soviet uncrewed Progress cargo spacecraft

- A Progress 7K-TG spacecraft
- Mission type: Mir resupply
- COSPAR ID: 1986-032A
- SATCAT no.: 16687

Spacecraft properties
- Spacecraft: Progress (No.136)
- Spacecraft type: Progress 7K-TG
- Manufacturer: NPO Energia

Start of mission
- Launch date: 23 April 1986, 19:40:05 UTC
- Rocket: Soyuz-U2
- Launch site: Baikonur, Site 1/5

End of mission
- Disposal: Deorbited
- Decay date: 23 June 1986, 18:41:01 UTC

Orbital parameters
- Reference system: Geocentric
- Regime: Low Earth
- Perigee altitude: 184 km
- Apogee altitude: 257 km
- Inclination: 51.6°
- Period: 88.9 minutes
- Epoch: 23 April 1986

Docking with Mir
- Docking port: Mir Core Module aft
- Docking date: 26 April 1986, 21:26:06 UTC
- Undocking date: 22 June 1986, 18:25:00 UTC

Progress 26 (Russian: Прогресс 26) was a Soviet uncrewed Progress cargo spacecraft, which was launched in April 1986 to resupply the Mir space station.

== Launch ==
Progress 26 launched on 23 April 1986 from the Baikonur Cosmodrome in the Kazakh SSR. It used a Soyuz-U2 rocket.

== Docking ==
Progress 26 docked with the aft port of the Mir Core Module on 26 April 1986 at 21:26:06 UTC, and was undocked on 22 June 1986 at 18:25:00 UTC.

== Decay ==
It remained in orbit until 23 June 1986, when it was deorbited. The deorbit burn occurred at 18:41:01 UTC.

== See also ==
- 1986 in spaceflight
- List of Progress missions
- List of uncrewed spaceflights to Mir
