= Progress M-22 =

Russian cargo spacecraft

- A Progress-M spacecraft
- Mission type: Mir resupply
- COSPAR ID: 1994-019A
- SATCAT no.: 23035

Spacecraft properties
- Spacecraft: Progress (No.222)
- Spacecraft type: Progress-M
- Manufacturer: RKK Energia

Start of mission
- Launch date: 22 March 1994, 04:54:12 UTC
- Rocket: Soyuz-U
- Launch site: Baikonur, Site 1/5

End of mission
- Disposal: Deorbited
- Decay date: 23 May 1994, 04:40 UTC

Orbital parameters
- Reference system: Geocentric
- Regime: Low Earth
- Perigee altitude: 192 km
- Apogee altitude: 238 km
- Inclination: 51.7°
- Period: 88.5 minutes
- Epoch: 22 March 1994

Docking with Mir
- Docking port: Kvant-1 aft
- Docking date: 24 March 1994, 06:39:37 UTC
- Undocking date: 23 May 1994, 00:58:38 UTC

Progress M-22 (Russian: Прогресс M-22) was a Russian unmanned Progress cargo spacecraft, which was launched in March 1994 to resupply the Mir space station.

== Launch ==
Progress M-22 launched on 22 March 1994 from the Baikonur Cosmodrome in Kazakhstan. It used a Soyuz-U rocket.

== Docking ==
Progress M-22 docked with the aft port of the Kvant-1 module of Mir on 24 March 1994 at 06:39:37 UTC, and was undocked on 23 May 1994 at 00:58:38 UTC.

== Decay ==
It remained in orbit until 23 May 1994, when it was deorbited. The mission ended at 04:40 UTC.

== See also ==
- 1994 in spaceflight
- List of Progress missions
- List of uncrewed spaceflights to Mir
