= Progress M-8 =

1991 Soviet spacecraft

- Mission type: Mir resupply
- COSPAR ID: 1991-038A
- SATCAT no.: 21395

Spacecraft properties
- Spacecraft type: Progress-M 11F615A55
- Manufacturer: NPO Energia
- Launch mass: 7,250 kilograms (15,980 lb)

Start of mission
- Launch date: 30 May 1991, 08:04:03 UTC
- Rocket: Soyuz-U2
- Launch site: Baikonur Site 1/5

End of mission
- Disposal: Deorbited
- Decay date: 16 August 1991, 06:59:32 UTC

Orbital parameters
- Reference system: Geocentric
- Regime: Low Earth
- Perigee altitude: 391 kilometres (243 mi)
- Apogee altitude: 394 kilometres (245 mi)
- Inclination: 51.6 degrees

Docking with Mir
- Docking port: Core Forward
- Docking date: 1 June 1991, 09:44:37 UTC
- Undocking date: 15 August 1991, 22:16:59 UTC
- Time docked: 75 days

Progress M-8 (Russian: Прогресс М-8) was a Soviet uncrewed cargo spacecraft which was launched in 1991 to resupply the Mir space station. The twenty-sixth of sixty four Progress spacecraft to visit Mir, it used the Progress-M 11F615A55 configuration, and had the serial number 207. It carried supplies including food, water and oxygen for the EO-9 crew aboard Mir, as well as equipment for conducting scientific research, and fuel for adjusting the station's orbit and performing manoeuvres. It also carried the Naduvaniy Hazovoy Ballon satellite, which was subsequently deployed from Mir.

Progress M-8 was launched at 08:04:03 GMT on 30 May 1991, atop a Soyuz-U2 carrier rocket flying from Site 1/5 at the Baikonur Cosmodrome. Following two days of free flight, it docked with the forward port of Mir's core module at 09:44:37 GMT on 1 June.

During the 75 days for which Progress M-8 was docked, Mir was in an orbit of around 391 by 394 kilometres (211 by 213 nmi), inclined at 51.6 degrees. Progress M-8 undocked from Mir at 22:16:59 GMT on 15 August, and was deorbited the next day, to a destructive reentry over the Pacific Ocean at around 06:59:32.

== See also ==
- 1991 in spaceflight
- List of Progress flights
- List of uncrewed spaceflights to Mir
