= Progress M-19 =

Russian uncrewed cargo spacecraft

- A Progress-M spacecraft
- Mission type: Mir resupply
- COSPAR ID: 1993-052A
- SATCAT no.: 22745

Spacecraft properties
- Spacecraft: Progress (No.219)
- Spacecraft type: Progress-M
- Manufacturer: RKK Energia

Start of mission
- Launch date: 10 August 1993, 22:23:45 UTC
- Rocket: Soyuz-U
- Launch site: Baikonur, Site 1/5

End of mission
- Disposal: Deorbited
- Decay date: 19 October 1993, 00:22:14 UTC

Orbital parameters
- Reference system: Geocentric
- Regime: Low Earth
- Perigee altitude: 179 km
- Apogee altitude: 223 km
- Inclination: 51.8°
- Period: 88.5 minutes
- Epoch: 13 August 1993

Docking with Mir
- Docking port: Kvant aft
- Docking date: 13 August 1993, 00:00:06 UTC
- Undocking date: 12 October 1993, 17:59:06 UTC

Progress M-19 (Russian: Прогресс M-19) was a Russian unmanned Progress cargo spacecraft, which was launched in 1993 to resupply the Mir space station.

== Launch ==
Progress M-19 launched on 10 August 1993 from the Baikonur Cosmodrome in Kazakhstan. It used a Soyuz-U rocket.

== Docking ==
Progress M-19 docked with the aft port of the Kvant-1 module of Mir on 13 August 1993 at 00:00:06 UTC, and was undocked on 12 October 1993 at 17:59:06.

== Decay ==
It remained in orbit until 18 October 1993, when it was deorbited. The mission ending occurred at 00:22:14 UTC on 19 October 1993, when the VBK-Raduga 8 capsule landed.

== See also ==
- 1993 in spaceflight
- List of Progress missions
- List of uncrewed spaceflights to Mir
