= Progress M-26 =

Russian cargo spacecraft

- A Progress-M spacecraft
- Mission type: Mir resupply
- COSPAR ID: 1995-005A
- SATCAT no.: 23477

Spacecraft properties
- Spacecraft: Progress (No.226)
- Spacecraft type: Progress-M
- Manufacturer: RKK Energia

Start of mission
- Launch date: 15 February 1995, 16:48:28 UTC
- Rocket: Soyuz-U
- Launch site: Baikonur, Site 1/5

End of mission
- Disposal: Deorbited
- Decay date: 15 March 1995, 06:15 UTC

Orbital parameters
- Reference system: Geocentric
- Regime: Low Earth
- Perigee altitude: 188 km
- Apogee altitude: 224 km
- Inclination: 51.6°
- Period: 88.6 minutes
- Epoch: 15 February 1995

Docking with Mir
- Docking port: Kvant-1 aft
- Docking date: 17 February 1995, 18:21:34 UTC
- Undocking date: 15 March 1995, 02:26:38 UTC

Progress M-26 (Russian: Прогресс M-26) was a Russian unmanned Progress cargo spacecraft, which was launched in February 1995 to resupply the Mir space station.

== Launch ==
Progress M-26 launched on 15 February 1995 from the Baikonur Cosmodrome in Kazakhstan. It used a Soyuz-U rocket.

== Docking ==
Progress M-26 docked with the aft port of the Kvant-1 module of Mir on 17 February 1995 at 18:21:34 UTC, and was undocked on 15 March 1995 at 02:26:38 UTC.

== Decay ==
It remained in orbit until 15 March 1995, when it was deorbited. The deorbit burn occurred at 05:28 UTC and the mission ended at 06:15 UTC.

== See also ==
- 1995 in spaceflight
- List of Progress missions
- List of uncrewed spaceflights to Mir
