= Progress M-25 =

Russian cargo spacecraft

- A Progress-M spacecraft
- Mission type: Mir resupply
- COSPAR ID: 1994-075A
- SATCAT no.: 23348

Spacecraft properties
- Spacecraft: Progress (No.225)
- Spacecraft type: Progress-M
- Manufacturer: RKK Energia

Start of mission
- Launch date: 11 November 1994, 07:21:58 UTC
- Rocket: Soyuz-U
- Launch site: Baikonur, Site 1/5

End of mission
- Disposal: Deorbited
- Decay date: 16 February 1995, 16:45 UTC

Orbital parameters
- Reference system: Geocentric
- Regime: Low Earth
- Perigee altitude: 184 km
- Apogee altitude: 238 km
- Inclination: 51.6°
- Period: 88.7 minutes
- Epoch: 11 November 1994

Docking with Mir
- Docking port: Kvant-1 aft
- Docking date: 13 November 1994, 09:04:29 UTC
- Undocking date: 16 February 1995, 13:03:00 UTC

Progress M-25 (Russian: Прогресс M-25) was a Russian unmanned Progress cargo spacecraft, which was launched in November 1994 to resupply the Mir space station.

== Launch ==
Progress M-25 launched on 11 November 1994 from the Baikonur Cosmodrome in Kazakhstan. It used a Soyuz-U rocket.

== Docking ==
Progress M-25 docked with the aft port of the Kvant-1 module of Mir on 13 November 1994 at 09:04:29 UTC, and was undocked on 16 February 1995 at 13:03:00 UTC.

== Decay ==
It remained in orbit until 16 February 1995, when it was deorbited. The deorbit burn occurred at 16:06:00 UTC and the mission ended at 16:45 UTC.

== See also ==
- 1994 in spaceflight
- List of Progress missions
- List of uncrewed spaceflights to Mir
