= Progress M-42 =

Russian cargo spacecraft

- A Progress-M spacecraft
- Mission type: Mir resupply
- COSPAR ID: 1999-038A
- SATCAT no.: 25858

Spacecraft properties
- Spacecraft: Progress (No.242)
- Spacecraft type: Progress-M
- Manufacturer: RKK Energia

Start of mission
- Launch date: 16 July 1999, 16:37:33 UTC
- Rocket: Soyuz-U
- Launch site: Baikonur, Site 1/5

End of mission
- Disposal: Deorbited
- Decay date: 2 February 2000, 06:10:40 UTC

Orbital parameters
- Reference system: Geocentric
- Regime: Low Earth
- Perigee altitude: 192 km
- Apogee altitude: 249 km
- Inclination: 51.6°
- Period: 88.6 minutes
- Epoch: 16 July 1999

Docking with Mir
- Docking port: Kvant-1 aft
- Docking date: 18 July 1999, 17:53:21 UTC
- Undocking date: 2 February 2000, 03:11:52 UTC

Progress M-42 (Russian: Прогресс M-42) was a Russian uncrewed Progress cargo spacecraft, which was launched in July 1999 to resupply the Mir space station.

== Launch ==
Progress M-42 launched on 16 July 1999 from the Baikonur Cosmodrome in Kazakhstan. It used a Soyuz-U rocket.

== Docking ==
Progress M-42 docked with the aft port of the Kvant-1 module of Mir on 18 July 1999 at 17:53:21 UTC, and was undocked on 2 February 2000 at 03:11:52 UTC.

== Decay ==
It remained in orbit until 2 February 2000, when it was deorbited. The deorbit burn occurred at 06:10:40 UTC and the mission ended at 06:57:20 UTC.

== See also ==
- 1999 in spaceflight
- List of Progress missions
- List of uncrewed spaceflights to Mir
