= 1988 in spaceflight =

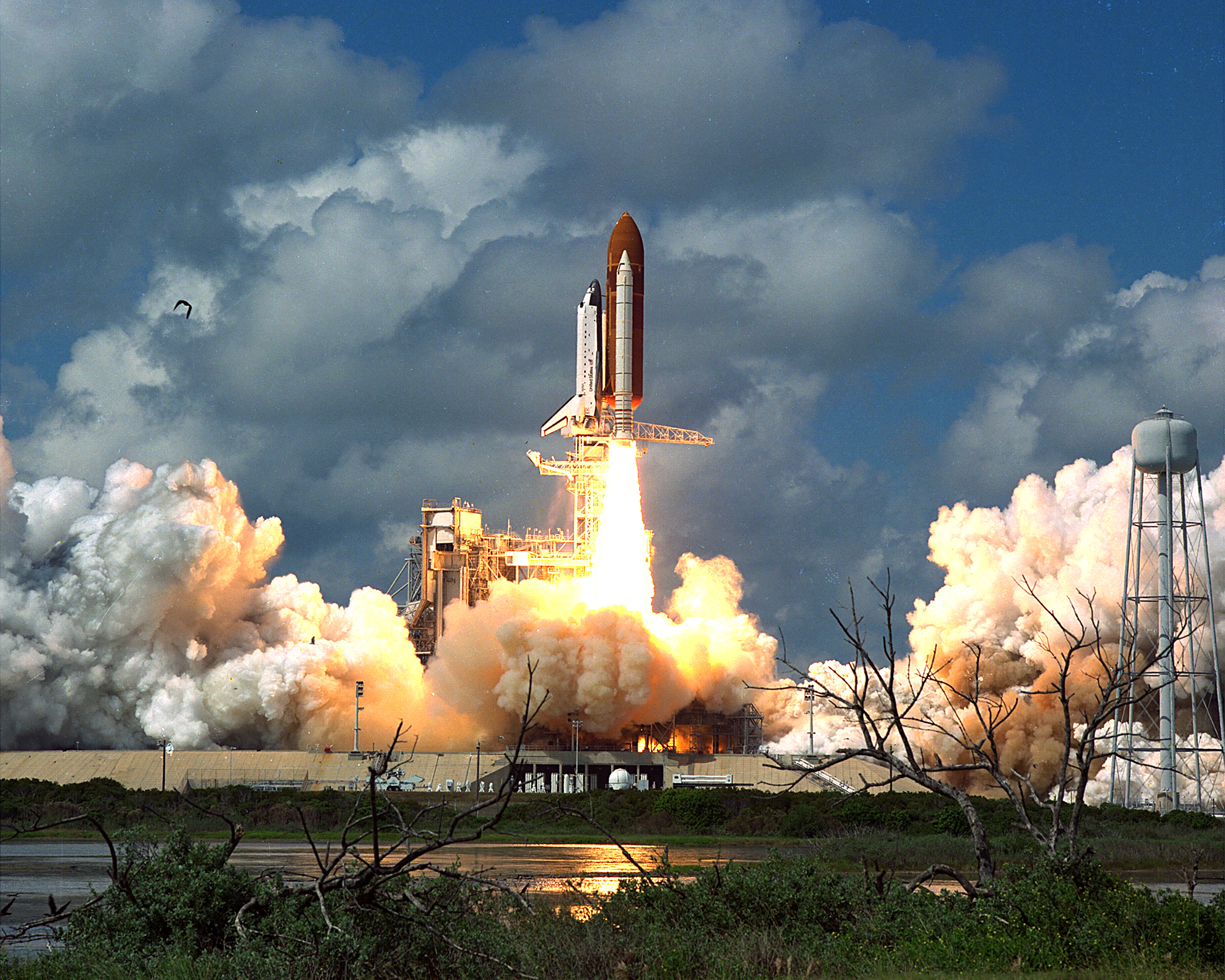
- Space Shuttle Discovery launches on STS-26R, the first US crewed spaceflight after the Challenger accident

Orbital launches
- First: 6 January 1988
- Last: 29 December 1988
- Total: 121
- Catalogued: 116

National firsts
- Satellite: Israel; Luxembourg
- Orbital launch: Israel
- Space traveller: Afghanistan

Rockets
- Maiden flights: Ariane 4 Long March 4A; Shavit
- Retirements: Energia; Titan 34D

Crewed flights
- Orbital: 5
- Total travellers: 19

1988 in spaceflight

The following is an outline of 1988 in spaceflight.

== Shuttle return to flight ==
Space Shuttle Discovery lifted off from Launch Complex 39B, Kennedy Space Center, at 11:37:00 a.m. EDT on September 29, 1988, 975 days after the Challenger disaster.

== Launches ==
- ← Jan
- Feb
- Mar
- Apr
- May
- Jun
- Jul
- Aug
- Sep
- Oct
- Nov
- Dec →

Date and time (UTC)	Rocket	Flight number	Launch site		LSP	
Date and time (UTC)	Payload (⚀ = CubeSat)	Operator	Orbit	Function	Decay (UTC)	Outcome
Date and time (UTC)	Remarks					
25 March	(United States) Scout G-1		(Italy) San Marco mobile range, Kenya		(Italy) ASI	
25 March	(Italy) San Marco-D/L	ASI	Low Earth	Atmospheric research	In orbit	Successful
7 June; 21:38:16	(Soviet Union) Soyuz-U2		(Soviet Union) Baikonur Site 1/5		(Soviet Union)	
7 June; 21:38:16	(Soviet Union) Soyuz TM-5		Low Earth (Mir)	Mir EP-2	7 September; 00:48:38	Successful
7 June; 21:38:16	Crewed flight launching three cosmonauts and landing two, computer problems during deorbit nearly resulted in loss of crew, and delayed landing by one day					
15 June; 11:19	(France) Ariane 4 44LP		(France) Kourou ELA-2		(France) Arianespace	
15 June; 11:19	Meteosat-3	EUMETSAT	GTO	Meteorology	In orbit	Successful
15 June; 11:19	(United States) PAS 1	PanAmSat	GTO	Communications	In orbit	Successful
15 June; 11:19	(Germany) AMSAT-OSCAR-13	AMSAT	Low Earth	Amateur radio	6 December 1996	Successful
15 June; 11:19	Maiden flight of the Ariane 4 rocket					
7 July; 17:38	(Soviet Union) Proton-K		(Soviet Union) Baikonur site LC200/39		(Soviet Union)	
7 July; 17:38	(Soviet Union) Fobos 1		Intended: Areocentric; Actual: Heliocentric	Mars orbiter	In orbit	Spacecraft failure
7 July; 17:38	stationary lander			Phobos lander	In orbit	Never deployed
7 July; 17:38	Loss of communication 2 September 1988 en route to Mars					
12 July; 17:01	(Soviet Union) Proton-K		(Soviet Union) Baikonur site LC200/40		(Soviet Union)	
12 July; 17:01	(Soviet Union) Fobos 2		Areocentric	Mars orbiter	In orbit	Spacecraft failure
12 July; 17:01	stationary lander			Phobos lander	In orbit	Never deployed
12 July; 17:01	"hopping" lander			Phobos lander	In orbit	Never deployed
12 July; 17:01	Loss of communication 27 March 1989 near Phobos					
29 August; 04:23:11	(Soviet Union) Soyuz-U2		(Soviet Union) Baikonur Site 1/5		(Soviet Union)	
29 August; 04:23:11	(Soviet Union) Soyuz TM-6		Low Earth (Mir)	Mir EP-3	21 December; 09:57:00	Successful
29 August; 04:23:11	Crewed flight with three cosmonauts, one remained on Mir as part of EO-3, first Afghan space traveller					
29 September; 15:37:00	(United States) Space Shuttle Discovery		(United States) Kennedy LC-39B		(United States) United Space Alliance	
29 September; 15:37:00	(United States) STS-26R	NASA	Low Earth	Satellite deployment	3 October; 16:37:11	Successful
29 September; 15:37:00	(United States) TDRS-3 (TDRS-C)	NASA	Geosynchronous	Communications	In orbit	Operational
29 September; 15:37:00	Crewed flight with five astronauts, first US crewed spaceflight after the Challenger accident in 1986, TDRS deployed using Inertial Upper Stage					
15 November; 03:00:02	(Soviet Union) Energia		(Soviet Union) Baikonur Site 110/37		(Soviet Union)	
15 November; 03:00:02	(Soviet Union) Buran 1K1		Low Earth	Test flight	06:26	Successful
15 November; 03:00:02	(Soviet Union) 37KB No.3770		Low Earth (Buran)	Test flight	06:26	Successful
15 November; 03:00:02	Uncrewed test, only flight of Buran and final flight of Energia					
26 November; 14:49:34	(Soviet Union) Soyuz-U2		(Soviet Union) Baikonur Site 1/5		(Soviet Union)	
26 November; 14:49:34	(Soviet Union) Soyuz TM-7		Low Earth (Mir)	Mir EO-4/EP-4	27 April 1989; 02:57:58	Successful
26 November; 14:49:34	Crewed flight with three cosmonauts					
2 December; 14:30:34	(United States) Space Shuttle Atlantis		(United States) Kennedy LC-39B		(United States) United Space Alliance	
2 December; 14:30:34	(United States) STS-27R	NASA/NRO	Low Earth	Satellite deployment	6 December; 23:30:39	Successful
2 December; 14:30:34	(United States) USA-34 (Lacrosse)	NRO/CIA	Low Earth	Radar imaging	25 March 1997	Successful
2 December; 14:30:34	Crewed flight with five astronauts					
11 December; 00:33	(France) Ariane 4 44LP		(France) Kourou ELA-2		(France) Arianespace	
11 December; 00:33	(United Kingdom) Skynet 4B	UK Ministry of Defence	GTO	Communications	In orbit	Successful
11 December; 00:33	(Luxembourg) Astra 1A	SES Astra	GTO	Communications	In orbit	Successful

== Deep-space rendezvous ==
There were no deep-space rendezvous in 1988.
