= 1987 in spaceflight =

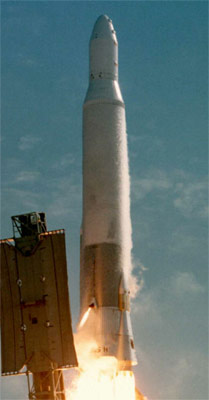
- The Atlas H launches on its final flight

Orbital launches
- First: 5 January
- Last: 29 December
- Total: 115
- Catalogued: 110

National firsts
- Space traveller: Syria

Rockets
- Maiden flights: ASLV; Energia
- Retirements: Atlas H N-II; Titan III(34)B

Crewed flights
- Orbital: 3
- Total travellers: 8

1987 in spaceflight

The following is an outline of 1987 in spaceflight.

== Launches ==
- ← Jan
- Feb
- Mar
- Apr
- May
- Jun
- Jul
- Aug
- Sep
- Oct
- Nov
- Dec →

Date and time (UTC)	Rocket	Flight number	Launch site		LSP	
Date and time (UTC)	Payload (⚀ = CubeSat)	Operator	Orbit	Function	Decay (UTC)	Outcome
Date and time (UTC)	Remarks					
5 February; 21:38:16	(Soviet Union) Soyuz-U2		(Soviet Union) Baikonur Site 1/5		(Soviet Union)	
5 February; 21:38:16	(Soviet Union) Soyuz TM-2		Low Earth (Mir)	Mir EO-2	30 July; 01:04:12	Successful
5 February; 21:38:16	Crewed flight launching two cosmonauts and landing three, first crewed flight of Soyuz-TM					
12 February; 06:40	(United States) Titan 34B/Agena-D		(United States) Vandenberg SLC-4W		(United States) U.S. Air Force	
12 February; 06:40	(United States) SDS-1 F-6	U.S. Air Force	Molniya	Communications	In orbit	Successful
12 February; 06:40	Final flight of the Titan IIIB rocket. Final use of the RM-81 Agena upper stage in any rocket.					
26 February; 23:05	(United States) Delta 3914		(United States) Cape Canaveral LC-17A		(United States)	
26 February; 23:05	(United States) GOES 7	NOAA	Geostationary	Weather	In orbit	Successful
20 March; 23:05	(United States) Delta-3920		(United States) Cape Canaveral LC-17		(United States)	
20 March; 23:05	(Indonesia) Palapa B2-P	PT Pasifik Satelit Nusantara	?	Communications	In orbit	Successful
31 March; 00:16:16	(Soviet Union) Proton-K		(Soviet Union) Baikonur Site 200/39		(Soviet Union)	
31 March; 00:16:16	(Soviet Union) Kvant-1	1991–2001: Roskosmos	Low Earth (Mir)	Mir module	23 March 2001; 05:59:36	Successful
31 March; 00:16:16	(Soviet Union) Kvant FSB		Low Earth (Kvant-1)	Space tug	25 August 1988	Successful
15 May; 17:30:01	(Soviet Union) Energia		(Soviet Union) Baikonur Site 250		(Soviet Union)	
15 May; 17:30:01	(Soviet Union) Polyus		Intended: Low Earth	Weapons tests Technology	15 May	Launch failure
15 May; 17:30:01	Maiden flight of Energia, computer error resulted in spacecraft attempting to perform circularisation burn in a retrograde orientation, failed to orbit					
8 June	(India) RH-300 Mk II		(India) Sriharikota		(India) ISRO	
8 June	(India)	ISRO	Suborbital	Engineering test	8 June	Successful
8 June	First flight of the RH-300 Mk II, reached an altitude of 130 km (80 miles)					
22 July; 01:59:17	(Soviet Union) Soyuz-U2		(Soviet Union) Baikonur Site 1/5		(Soviet Union)	
22 July; 01:59:17	(Soviet Union) Soyuz TM-3		Low Earth (Mir)	Mir EP-1	29 December; 09:16:15	Successful
22 July; 01:59:17	Crewed flight with three cosmonauts, first Syrian in space, carried replacement for ill EO-2 crewmember					
24 August; 16:30	(United Kingdom) Skylark 7		(Australia) Woomera Test Range LA2 D		(West Germany) MORABA	
24 August; 16:30	(West Germany) Supernova (W-GR-147)	DFVLR	Suborbital	X-ray astronomy	24 August	Successful
24 August; 16:30	Apogee: ~270 km					
8 October	(Brazil) Sonda IV		(Brazil) Barreira do Inferno Launch Center		(Brazil) IAE	
8 October	(Brazil)	IAE	Suborbital	Engineering test	8 October	Successful
8 October	"Operation Petrópolis". R&D launch for the VLS program. 510 kg payload. 570 km apogee.					
21 November; 02:19:00	(France) Ariane 2		(France) Kourou ELA-2		(France) Arianespace	
21 November; 02:19:00	(West Germany) TV-SAT 1	Deutsche Bundespost	Current: Graveyard; Operational: Geosynchronous	Communications	In orbit	Spacecraft failure
21 November; 02:19:00	Immediately after launch, one of its solar panels failed to deploy, and as a result of this the main uplink antenna, which was located behind the solar panel, could not deploy either. Briefly used to verify the systems of the Spacebus 300 satellite bus before being retired to a graveyard orbit.					
21 December; 11:18:03	(Soviet Union) Soyuz-U2		(Soviet Union) Baikonur Site 1/5		(Soviet Union)	
21 December; 11:18:03	(Soviet Union) Soyuz TM-4		Low Earth (Mir)	Mir EO-3	17 June 1988; 10:12:32	Successful
21 December; 11:18:03	Crewed flight with three cosmonauts					

== Deep-space rendezvous ==
There were no deep-space rendezvous in 1987.
