= Kvant-1 =

Soviet space module

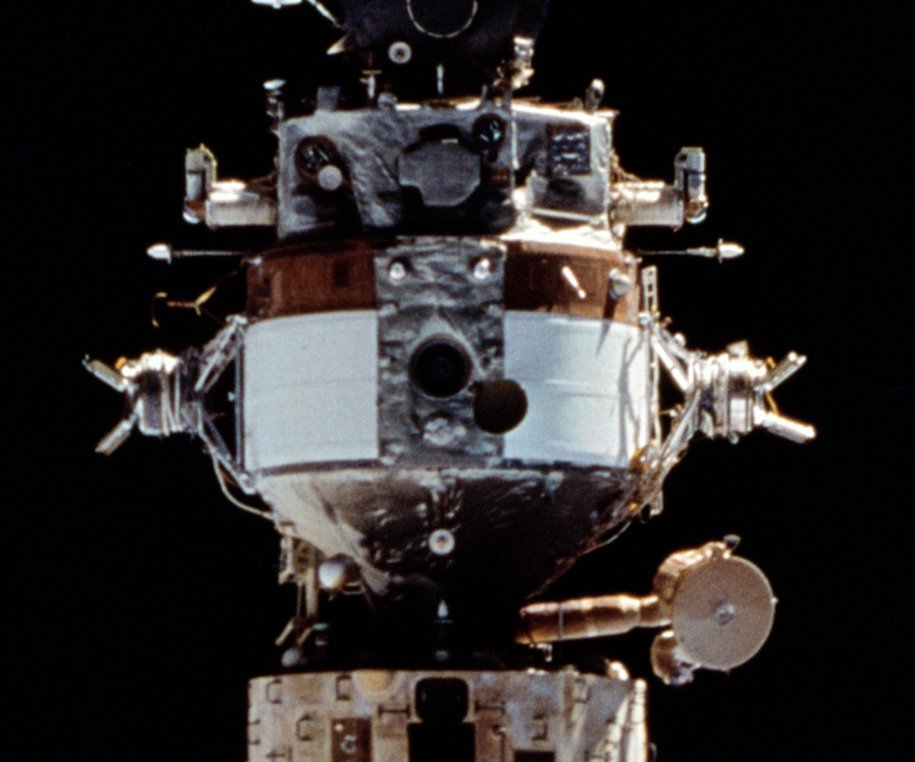

Module statistics
- COSPAR ID: 1987-030A
- Part of: Mir
- Launch date: March 31, 1987 (UTC)
- Reentry: March 23, 2001
- Length: 5.3 m (17 ft)
- Diameter: 4.35 m (14.3 ft)
- Pressurised volume: 40 m^{3} (1,400 cu ft)

Configuration
- Diagram of Kvant-1, in its original configuration.

Kvant-1 (Russian: Квант-1; English: Quantum-1) (37KE) was the first module to be attached in 1987 to the Mir Core Module, which formed the core of the Soviet space station Mir. It remained attached to Mir until the entire space station was deorbited in 2001.

The Kvant-1 module contained scientific instruments for astrophysical observations and materials science experiments. It was used to conduct research into the physics of active galaxies, quasars and neutron stars and it was uniquely positioned for studies of the Supernova SN 1987A. Furthermore, it supported biotechnology experiments in anti-viral preparations and fractions. Some additions to Kvant-1 during its lifetime were solar arrays and the Sofora and Rapana girders.

The Kvant-1 module was based on the TKS spacecraft and was the first, experimental version of a planned series of '37K' type modules. The 37K modules featured a jettisonable TKS-E type propulsion module, also called the Functional Service Module (FSM). The control system of Kvant-1 had been developed by NPO "Electropribor" (Kharkiv, Ukraine).

After previous engineering tests with the Salyut 6 and Salyut 7 space stations (and temporarily attached TKS-derived space station modules like Kosmos 1267, Kosmos 1443 and Kosmos 1686) it became the first space station module to be attached semi-permanently to the first modular space station in the history of space flight. Kvant-1 was originally planned to be docked to the Salyut 7 space station, the plans however evolved to launch to Mir, initially considered on board the Soviet Buran shuttle, which finally changed to a launch to Mir by the Proton-K rocket.

== Background ==
Kvant-1 docked to the Mir Core Module, with Soyuz TM-3 docked to its aft port.

The Kvant spacecraft represented the first use of a new kind of Soviet space station module, designated 37K. An order authorising the beginning of development was issued on 17 September 1979. The basic 37K design consisted of a 4.2 m diameter pressurised cylinder with a docking port at the forward end. It was not equipped with its own propulsion system. The original authorisation was for a total of eight 37K's of various configurations:

- One experimental 37KE (using a surplus FGB module of the cancelled Chelomei TKS crewed ferry as a tug) which would be docked to the front port of the Salyut 7 space station.
- Four 37KS modules for Mir. These would be delivered and docked to the station by a new lighter-weight FGO tug.
- Three 37KB modules. These would be carried in the payload bay of the Buran space shuttle. They could remain attached to the bay or (modified to the 37KBI configuration) be docked to the Mir or Mir-2 space stations using the Buran manipulator arm.

The 37KE was designated Kvant and was equipped with an astrophysics payload. It also used the Salyut-5B digital flight control computer and Gyrodyne flywheel orientation system developed for Almaz. As the module neared completion Salyut 7 experienced numerous technical problems and Kvant was retargeted for docking with Mir. But at that time Mir was planned to be in a 65-degree orbit, and Kvant was 800 kg too heavy for the Proton launch vehicle to place in such an orbit. In January 1985 Mir was changed to a 51.6-degree orbit, which solved one problem. But now it was planned that Kvant would dock with the rear port of Mir, requiring the addition of lines to conduct rocket propellant from the Progress tanker spacecraft to Mir's storage tanks. This increased weight again, forcing the FGB to have its propellant load reduced to 60% in the high-pressure tanks and empty low-pressure tanks. With a reported total launch weight varying between 20,600 and 22,797 kilograms (45,415 and 50,259 lb), Kvant-1 was supposedly at that time the heaviest payload lifted by Proton, requiring special custom modifications to its launch vehicle.

== Description ==
Kvant-1 consisted of two pressurized working compartments, one unpressurized experiment compartment and one small airlock for access to the telescopes and film change and retrieval. It also carried additional life support systems including an Elektron oxygen generator and equipment for removing carbon dioxide from the air.

Scientific equipment on board Kvant-1 included:

- The Roentgen X-ray astronomy telescope suite with four instruments:
  - TTM, a coded mask imaging spectrometer / wide-angle camera (Dutch/British)
  - Sirene 2, a gas scintillation proportional spectrometer (ESA)
  - HEXE, the High Energy X-ray Experiment (German)
  - Pulsar X-1, an X-ray/gamma ray (20-1300 keV) detector
- Glazar, an ultraviolet telescope
- Mariya, a magnetic spectrometer
- Svetlana, an electrophoresis unit
- and finally Arfa-E, installed on the exterior of the module in January 1990 to investigate the Earth's ionosphere and magnetosphere

To allow astronomical observations, Kvant-1 carried – in addition to two Earth horizon sensors, two star sensors, and three star trackers – six gyrodines which permitted extremely accurate pointing of the entire Mir complex. As the gyrodines were powered by electricity, they also reduced significantly the amount of attitude control propellant needed by the Mir base block's control thrusters – saving 15 tons of propellant in the first two years. They did, however, use a great deal of electricity – the average consumption of the Kvant-1 module was estimated to have been 6.90 kW.

== Launch and docking ==
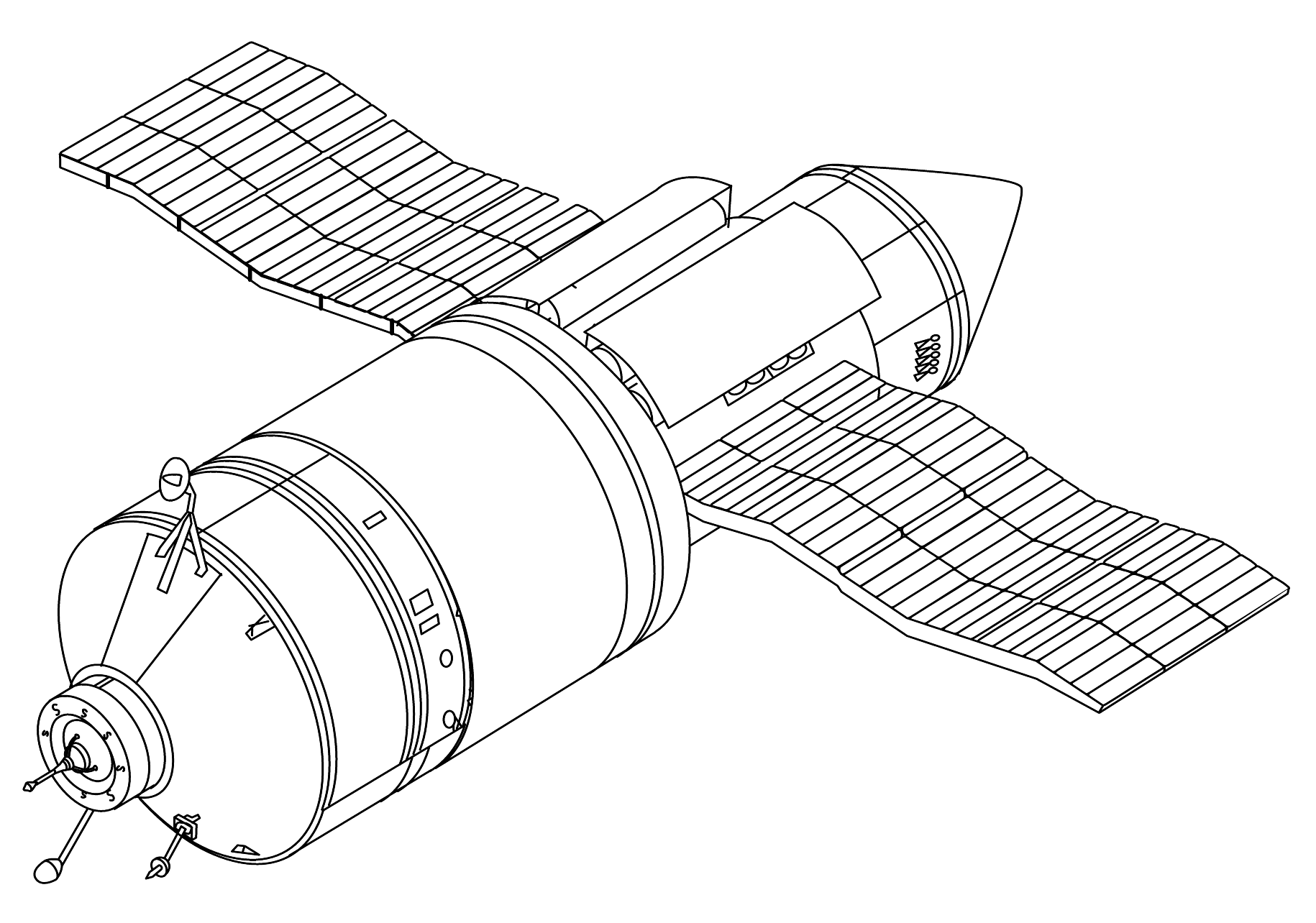
Kvant-1 (on the left) attached to the FSM orbital tug.

Kvant-1 was originally intended to be launched and docked to Salyut 7, but delays forced it to be launched to Mir instead. Kvant-1 did not have any propulsion systems of its own and to reach Mir, Kvant-1 was mated with a Functional Service Module (FSM) – carrying propulsion and electrical systems – to act as a space tug. The FSM was derived from the TKS spacecraft, which would later form the basis for the Functional Cargo Block of the Kvant-2, Kristall, Spektr, and Priroda modules.

Kvant-1 and its FSM were launched on March 30, 1987 – at the time of the launch, the Mir station was staffed by the EO-2 crew, which had already docked on the front port with the Soyuz TM-2 spacecraft. On April 9, Kvant-1 achieved a soft dock with the aft port on Mir. However, the Kvant-1 was not able to achieve a hard dock which meant that the two spacecraft were only loosely connected – in this configuration, Mir could not orient itself or else damage would occur.

The EO-2 crew conducted an emergency EVA on April 11 to investigate the problem. The crew found a piece of debris, probably a trash bag, that was left by Progress 28. After removing it, Kvant-1 was finally able to achieve a hard dock with the station on the same day. The Kvant-FSM, which contained the now unneeded propulsion of the Kvant-1 module, was finally jettisoned on April 12, revealing Kvant-1's rear docking port.

== Initial operation ==
After finally achieving hard-dock and jettisoning of the Kvant-FSM, tests of the onboard systems of Kvant-1 were conducted until the end of April. May was spent in preparation for the extension of the electrical power with activities which required little electricity, like medical experiments and Earth resources photography – much-needed additional electrical power would enable experiments like the Korund 1-M kiln, which was used to conduct melts lasting several days, and to power Kvant-1's gyrodines, needed for astronomical observations. For this, Kvant had carried stowed solar arrays, which were attached to the Mir base block during an EVA on June 12.

With the testing of Kvant-1 concluded, additional solar panels installed and Kvant's gyrodines available, a major step in the construction of the Mir space station was achieved. The X-ray telescope onboard Kvant-1 could start with a bang: it was uniquely placed to study Supernova SN 1987A in the Large Magellanic Cloud, the peak of its light reaching Earth in May 1987. The cosmonauts onboard Mir could examine the exploding star during 115 sessions between June and September 1987.

== Later modifications ==
In January 1991, support structures that were designed to hold solar arrays were installed on Kvant-1. In July 1991, the crew constructed the Sofora girder during four EVAs. The Sofora girder was designed to test new construction techniques, mount a propulsion unit, and act as a place to hold experiments outside the station. In September 1992, the crew installed the VDU propulsion unit on the end of the Sofora girder. It was delivered earlier by Progress M-14. The VDU was designed to increase the station's attitude control capability. The then-six-year-old VDU propulsion unit was finally replaced in April 1998 by a new one that was delivered by Progress M-38.

In September 1993, the Rapana girder was constructed on Kvant-1 during two EVAs. The Rapana girder was designed to test girder assembly experiments for a possible Mir 2 space station. External experiments were also later held on the Rapana girder. In June, 1996, the Rapana girder was extended during an EVA.

On May 22, 1995, one of Kristall's solar panels was redeployed on Kvant-1. In May 1996, the Mir Cooperative Solar Array, which was delivered with the Mir Docking Module, was deployed on Kvant-1. In November 1997, Kristall's old solar panel that was attached to Kvant-1 was disposed of and the all-Russian solar array, which was also delivered with the Docking Module, was attached in its place.

== 1997 fire ==
On February 23, 1997, a backup solid-fuel oxygen canister caught fire in the Kvant-1 module. The fire spewed molten metal, and the crew was concerned that it could melt through the hull of the space station. Smoke filled the station, and the crew donned respirators to continue breathing, although some respirators were faulty and did not supply oxygen. After burning for fourteen minutes and using up three fire extinguishers, the fire died out. The smoke remained thick for forty-five minutes after the fire was extinguished. After the respirators ran out of oxygen and the smoke began to clear the crew switched to using filter masks.
