= Soyuz-U2 =

Carrier rocket

- Function: Orbital carrier rocket
- Manufacturer: Samara Progress
- Country of origin: Soviet Union

Size
- Height: 34.54 metres (113.3 ft)
- Diameter: 2.95 metres (9 ft 8 in)
- Mass: 297,800 kilograms (656,500 lb)
- Stages: 2

Capacity

Payload to LEO
- Mass: 7,050 kilograms (15,540 lb)

Associated rockets
- Family: R-7 (Soyuz)

Launch history
- Status: Retired
- Launch sites: LC-1/5 & 31/6, Baikonur
- Total launches: 72
- Success(es): 72
- Failure: 0
- First flight: 23 December 1982
- Last flight: 3 September 1995
- Carries passengers or cargo: Soyuz crew Progress cargo Zenit, Orlets spy satellites Gamma telescope

The Soyuz-U2 (GRAU index 11A511U2) was a Soviet, later Russian, carrier rocket. It was derived from the Soyuz-U, and a member of the R-7 family of rockets. It featured increased performance compared with the baseline Soyuz-U, due to the use of syntin propellant, as opposed to RP-1 paraffin, used on the Soyuz-U.

The increased payload of the Soyuz-U2 allowed heavier spacecraft to be launched, while lighter spacecraft could be placed in higher orbits, compared to those launched by Soyuz-U rockets. In 1996, it was announced that the Soyuz-U2 had been retired, as the performance advantage gained through the use of syntin did not justify the additional cost of its production. The final flight, Soyuz TM-22, occurred on 3 September 1995 from Gagarin's Start in Baikonur.

The Soyuz-U2 was first used to launch four Zenit reconnaissance satellites, then it delivered crewed Soyuz spacecraft to space stations Salyut 7 and Mir: missions Soyuz T-12 to T-15 and Soyuz TM-1 to TM-22. It also supplied the stations with Progress cargo spacecraft: Progress 20 to Salyut 7, Progress 25 to 42 to Mir, followed by the new generation Progress M-1 to M-18 and finally M-23. Other missions included the Gamma telescope and three Orlets reconnaissance satellites. In total, Soyuz-U2 was launched 72 times and experienced no failures over its operational lifetime.

== See also ==
- List of R-7 launches
