= List of R-7 launches (1990–1994) =

This is a list of launches made by the R-7 Semyorka ICBM, and its derivatives between 1990 and 1994. All launches are orbital satellite launches, unless stated otherwise.

Date and time (GMT)	Configuration	Serial number	Launch site	Result	Payload	Remarks
== 1990 ==
17 January 1990, 14:45	Soyuz-U (11A511U)		LC-43/3, Plesetsk	Successful	Kosmos 2055 (Zenit-8)	
23 January 1990, 02:52	Molniya-M (8K78M)		LC-43/4, Plesetsk	Successful	Molniya 3-37	
25 January 1990, 17:15	Soyuz-U (11A511U)		LC-16/2, Plesetsk	Successful	Kosmos 2057 (Yantar-4K2)	
11 February 1990, 06:16	Soyuz-U2 (11A511U2)		LC-1/5, Baikonur	Successful	Soyuz TM-9	Crewed orbital flight, 2 cosmonauts Docked to Mir
28 February 1990, 23:10	Soyuz-U2 (11A511U2)		LC-1/5, Baikonur	Successful	Progress M-3	Mir Logistics
22 March 1990, 07:20	Soyuz-U (11A511U)		LC-43/4, Plesetsk	Successful	Kosmos 2062 (Zenit-8)	
27 March 1990, 16:40	Molniya-M (8K78M)		LC-43/3, Plesetsk	Successful	Kosmos 2063 (Oko)	
3 April 1990, 12:02	Soyuz-U (11A511U)		LC-43/4, Plesetsk	Failure	Yantar-4K2	Blok I orientation sensor failed. Automatic shutoff command T+358 seconds.
11 April 1990, 17:00	Soyuz-U (11A511U)		LC-43/3, Plesetsk	Successful	Foton-3	
13 April 1990, 18:53	Soyuz-U (11A511U)		LC-1/5, Baikonur	Successful	Kosmos 2072 (Yantar-4KS1)	
17 April 1990, 08:00	Soyuz-U (11A511U)		LC-43/3, Plesetsk	Successful	Kosmos 2073 (Zenit-8)	
26 April 1990, 01:37	Molniya-M (8K78M)		LC-43/4, Plesetsk	Successful	Molniya 1-77	
28 April 1990, 11:37	Molniya-M (8K78M)		LC-16/2, Plesetsk	Successful	Kosmos 2076 (Oko)	
5 May 1990, 20:44	Soyuz-U2 (11A511U2)		LC-1/5, Baikonur	Successful	Progress 42	Mir Logistics
7 May 1990, 18:39	Soyuz-U (11A511U)		LC-16/2, Plesetsk	Successful	Kosmos 2077 (Yantar-4K2)	
15 May 1990, 09:55	Soyuz-U (11A511U)		LC-1/5, Baikonur	Successful	Kosmos 2078 (Yantar-1KFT)	
29 May 1990, 07:19	Soyuz-U (11A511U)		LC-43/4, Plesetsk	Successful	Resurs F-6	
13 June 1990, 01:07	Molniya-M (8K78M)		LC-43/3, Plesetsk	Successful	Molniya 3-38	
19 June 1990, 08:45	Soyuz-U (11A511U)		LC-16/2, Plesetsk	Successful	Kosmos 2083 (Zenit-8)	
21 June 1990, 20:45	Molniya-M (8K78M)		LC-43/3, Plesetsk	Partial Failure	Kosmos 2084 (Oko)	Excessive vibration during Blok L firing results in tumbling of the stage
3 July 1990, 19:20	Soyuz-U (11A511U)		LC-16/2, Plesetsk	Failure	Yantar-4K2	Electromagnetic interference at strap-on separation results in malfunction of the booster guidance system. Automatic shutdown command issued T+123 seconds.
11 July 1990, 10:00	Soyuz-U2 (11A511U2)		LC-1/5, Baikonur	Successful	Gamma	
17 July 1990, 09:29	Soyuz-U (11A511U)		LC-43/3, Plesetsk	Successful	Resurs F-7	
20 July 1990, 08:40	Soyuz-U (11A511U)		LC-43/3, Plesetsk	Successful	Kosmos 2086 (Zenit-8)	
25 July 1990, 18:13	Molniya-M (8K78M)		LC-16/2, Plesetsk	Successful	Kosmos 2087 (Oko)	
1 August 1990, 09:32	Soyuz-U2 (11A511U2)		LC-1/5, Baikonur	Successful	Soyuz TM-10	Crewed orbital flight, 2 cosmonauts Docked to Mir
3 August 1990, 19:45	Soyuz-U (11A511U)		LC-16/2, Plesetsk	Successful	Kosmos 2089 (Yantar-4K2)	
10 August 1990, 20:18	Molniya-M (8K78M)		LC-43/4, Plesetsk	Successful	Molniya 1-78	
15 August 1990, 04:00	Soyuz-U2 (11A511U2)		LC-1/5, Baikonur	Successful	Progress M-4	Mir Logistics
16 August 1990, 09:54	Soyuz-U (11A511U)		LC-43/4, Plesetsk	Successful	Resurs F-8	
28 August 1990, 07:49	Molniya-M (8K78M)		LC-43/4, Plesetsk	Successful	Kosmos 2097 (Oko)	
31 August 1990, 08:00	Soyuz-U (11A511U)		LC-43/3, Plesetsk	Successful	Kosmos 2099 (Zenit-8)	
7 September 1990, 11:59	Soyuz-U (11A511U)		LC-16/2, Plesetsk	Successful	Resurs F-9	
20 September 1990, 20:16	Molniya-M (8K78M)		LC-43/4, Plesetsk	Successful	Molniya 3-39	
27 September 1990, 10:37	Soyuz-U2 (11A511U2)		LC-1/5, Baikonur	Successful	Progress M-5	Mir Logistics
1 October 1990, 11:00	Soyuz-U2 (11A511U2)		LC-1/5, Baikonur	Successful	Kosmos 2101 (Don)	
16 October 1990, 19:00	Soyuz-U (11A511U)		LC-16/2, Plesetsk	Successful	Kosmos 2102 (Yantar-4K2)	
16 November 1990, 16:30	Soyuz-U (11A511U)		LC-43/4, Plesetsk	Successful	Kosmos 2104 (Zenit-8)	
20 November 1990, 02:33	Molniya-M (8K78M)		LC-16/2, Plesetsk	Successful	Kosmos 2105 (Oko)	
23 November 1990, 03:51	Molniya-M (8K78M)		LC-43/3, Plesetsk	Successful	Molniya 1-79	
2 December 1990, 08:13	Soyuz-U2 (11A511U2)		LC-1/5, Baikonur	Successful	Soyuz TM-11	Crewed orbital flight, 3 cosmonauts Docked to Mir
4 December 1990, 18:30	Soyuz-U (11A511U)		LC-43/4, Plesetsk	Successful	Kosmos 2108 (Yantar-4K2)	
21 December 1990, 06:20	Soyuz-U (11A511U)		LC-1/5, Baikonur	Successful	Kosmos 2113 (Yantar-4KS1)	
26 December 1990, 11:10	Soyuz-U (11A511U)		LC-16/2, Plesetsk	Successful	Kosmos 2120 (Zenit-8)	
== 1991 ==
14 January 1991, 14:50	Soyuz-U2 (11A511U2)		LC-1/5, Baikonur	Successful	Progress M-6	Mir Logistics
17 January 1991, 10:30	Soyuz-U (11A511U)		LC-16/2, Plesetsk	Successful	Kosmos 2121 (Zenit-8)	
7 February 1991, 18:15	Soyuz-U (11A511U)		LC-16/2, Plesetsk	Successful	Kosmos 2124 (Yantar-4K2)	
15 February 1991, 09:30	Soyuz-U (11A511U)		LC-1/5, Baikonur	Successful	Kosmos 2134 (Yantar-1KFT)	
15 February 1991, 15:19	Molniya-M (8K78M)		LC-43/3, Plesetsk	Successful	Molniya 1-80	
6 March 1991, 15:30	Soyuz-U (11A511U)		LC-16/2, Plesetsk	Successful	Kosmos 2136 (Zenit-8)	
19 March 1991, 13:05	Soyuz-U2 (11A511U2)		LC-1/5, Baikonur	Successful	Progress M-7	Mir Logistics
22 March 1991, 12:19	Molniya-M (8K78M)		LC-43/4, Plesetsk	Successful	Molniya 3-55L	
26 March 1991, 13:45	Soyuz-U (11A511U)		LC-16/2, Plesetsk	Successful	Kosmos 2138 (Yantar-4K2)	
18 May 1991, 12:50	Soyuz-U2 (11A511U2)		LC-1/5, Baikonur	Successful	Soyuz TM-12	Crewed orbital flight, 3 cosmonauts Docked to Mir
21 May 1991, 09:00	Soyuz-U (11A511U)		LC-43/4, Plesetsk	Successful	Resurs F-10	
24 May 1991, 15:29	Soyuz-U (11A511U)		LC-43/3, Plesetsk	Successful	Kosmos 2149 (Yantar-4K2)	
30 May 1991, 08:04	Soyuz-U2 (11A511U2)		LC-1/5, Baikonur	Successful	Progress M-8	Mir Logistics
18 June 1991, 09:09	Molniya-M (8K78M)		LC-43/4, Plesetsk	Successful	Molniya 1-81	
28 June 1991, 08:09	Soyuz-U (11A511U)		LC-43/3, Plesetsk	Successful	Resurs F-11	
9 July 1991, 09:40	Soyuz-U (11A511U)		LC-43/4, Plesetsk	Successful	Kosmos 2152 (Zenit-8)	
10 July 1991, 14:00	Soyuz-U (11A511U)		LC-31/6, Baikonur	Successful	Kosmos 2153 (Yantar-4KS1M)	
23 July 1991, 09:05	Soyuz-U (11A511U)		LC-43/3, Plesetsk	Successful	Resurs F-12	
1 August 1991, 11:53	Molniya-M (8K78M)		LC-43/4, Plesetsk	Successful	Molniya 1-82	
20 August 1991, 22:54	Soyuz-U2 (11A511U2)		LC-1/5, Baikonur	Successful	Progress M-9	Mir Logistics
21 August 1991, 10:50	Soyuz-U (11A511U)		LC-43/3, Plesetsk	Successful	Resurs F-2	
29 August 1991, 06:48	Vostok-2M (8A92M)		LC-31/6, Baikonur	Successful	IRS-1B	Final flight of Vostok-2M 8A92M
17 September 1991, 20:01	Molniya-M (8K78M)		LC-43/4, Plesetsk	Successful	Molniya 3-48L	
19 September 1991, 16:20	Soyuz-U (11A511U)		LC-43/3, Plesetsk	Successful	Kosmos 2156 (Yantar-4K2)	
2 October 1991, 05:59	Soyuz-U2 (11A511U2)		LC-1/5, Baikonur	Successful	Soyuz TM-13	Crewed orbital flight, 3 cosmonauts Docked to Mir
4 October 1991, 18:10	Soyuz-U (11A511U)		LC-43/4, Plesetsk	Successful	Foton-4	
9 October 1991, 13:15	Soyuz-U2 (11A511U2)		LC-1/5, Baikonur	Successful	Kosmos 2163 (Ortlets)	
17 October 1991, 00:05	Soyuz-U2 (11A511U2)		LC-1/5, Baikonur	Successful	Progress M-10	Mir Logistics
20 November 1991, 19:15	Soyuz-U (11A511U)		LC-43/3, Plesetsk	Successful	Kosmos 2171 (Yantar-4K2)	
17 December 1991, 11:00	Soyuz-U (11A511U)		LC-31/6, Baikonur	Successful	Kosmos 2174 (Yantar-1KFT)	
== 1992 ==
21 January 1992, 15:00	Soyuz-U (11A511U)		LC-43/3, Plesetsk	Successful	Kosmos 2175 (Yantar)	
24 January 1992, 01:18	Molniya-M (8K78M)		LC-43/3, Plesetsk	Successful	Kosmos 2176 (Oko)	
25 January 1992, 07:50	Soyuz-U2 (11A511U2)		LC-1/5, Baikonur	Successful	Progress M-11	Mir Logistics
4 March 1992, 04:27	Molniya-M (8K78M)		LC-43/4, Plesetsk	Successful	Molniya 1-83	
17 March 1992, 10:54	Soyuz-U2 (11A511U2)		LC-1/5, Baikonur	Successful	Soyuz TM-14	Crewed orbital flight, 3 cosmonauts Docked to Mir
1 April 1992, 14:18	Soyuz-U (11A511U)		LC-16/2, Plesetsk	Successful	Kosmos 2182 (Yantar-4K2)	
8 April 1992, 12:20	Soyuz-U (11A511U)		LC-31/6, Baikonur	Successful	Kosmos 2183 (Yantar-4K2)	
19 April 1992, 21:29	Soyuz-U2 (11A511U2)		LC-1/5, Baikonur	Successful	Progress M-12	Mir Logistics
29 April 1992, 09:00	Soyuz-U (11A511U)		LC-43/4, Plesetsk	Successful	Resurs F-14	
29 April 1992, 10:10	Soyuz-U (11A511U)		LC-1/5, Baikonur	Successful	Kosmos 2185 (Yantar-1KFT)	
28 May 1992, 19:09	Soyuz-U (11A511U)		LC-16/2, Plesetsk	Successful	Kosmos 2186 (Yantar-4K2)	
23 June 1992, 08:00	Soyuz-U (11A511U)		LC-43/3, Plesetsk	Successful	Resurs F-15	
30 June 1992, 16:43	Soyuz-U2 (11A511U2)		LC-31/6, Baikonur	Successful	Progress M-13	Mir Logistics
8 July 1992, 09:53	Molniya-M (8K78M)		LC-43/3, Plesetsk	Successful	Kosmos 2196 (Oko)	
24 July 1992, 19:40	Soyuz-U (11A511U)		LC-43/3, Plesetsk	Successful	Kosmos 2203 (Yantar-4K2)	
27 July 1992, 06:08	Soyuz-U2 (11A511U2)		LC-1/5, Baikonur	Successful	Soyuz TM-15	Crewed orbital flight, 3 cosmonauts Docked to Mir
30 July 1992, 11:00	Soyuz-U (11A511U)		LC-43/4, Plesetsk	Successful	Kosmos 2207 (Zenit-8)	
6 August 1992, 19:30	Molniya-M (8K78M)		LC-43/3, Plesetsk	Successful	Molniya 1-84	
15 August 1992, 22:18	Soyuz-U2 (11A511U2)		LC-31/6, Baikonur	Successful	Progress M-14	Mir Logistics
19 August 1992, 10:20	Soyuz-U (11A511U)		LC-16/2, Plesetsk	Successful	Resurs F-16	
22 September 1992, 16:10	Soyuz-U (11A511U)		LC-16/2, Plesetsk	Successful	Kosmos 2210 (Yantar-4K2)	
8 October 1992, 19:00	Soyuz-U (11A511U)		LC-43/4, Plesetsk	Successful	Foton-5	
14 October 1992, 19:58	Molniya-M (8K78M)		LC-43/3, Plesetsk	Successful	Molniya 3-50L	
21 October 1992, 10:21	Molniya-M (8K78M)		LC-16/2, Plesetsk	Successful	Kosmos 2217 (Oko)	
27 October 1992, 17:19	Soyuz-U2 (11A511U2)		LC-31/6, Baikonur	Successful	Progress M-15	Mir Logistics
15 November 1992, 21:45	Soyuz-U (11A511U)		LC-16/2, Plesetsk	Successful	Resurs-500	
20 November 1992, 15:29	Soyuz-U (11A511U)		LC-43/4, Plesetsk	Successful	Kosmos 2220 (Yantar-4K2)	
25 November 1992, 12:18	Molniya-M (8K78M)		LC-43/3, Plesetsk	Successful	Kosmos 2222 (Oko)	
2 December 1992, 01:57	Molniya-M (8K78M)		LC-43/3, Plesetsk	Successful	Molniya 3-56L	
9 December 1992, 11:25	Soyuz-U (11A511U)		LC-1/5, Baikonur	Successful	Kosmos 2223 (Yantar-4KS1)	
22 December 1992, 12:00	Soyuz-U (11A511U)		LC-31/6, Baikonur	Successful	Kosmos 2225 (Ortlets)	
29 December 1992, 13:30	Soyuz-U (11A511U)		LC-43/3, Plesetsk	Successful	Kosmos 2229 (Bion 10)	
== 1993 ==
13 January 1993, 01:49	Molniya-M (8K78M)		LC-43/3, Plesetsk	Successful	Molniya 1-85	
19 January 1993, 05:58	Soyuz-U2 (11A511U2)		LC-1/5, Baikonur	Successful	Soyuz TM-16	Crewed orbital flight, 2 cosmonauts Docked to Mir
26 January 1993, 15:55	Molniya-M (8K78M)		LC-16/2, Plesetsk	Successful	Kosmos 2232 (Oko)	
21 February 1993, 18:32	Soyuz-U2 (11A511U2)		LC-1/5, Baikonur	Successful	Progress M-16	Mir Logistics
31 March 1993, 03:34	Soyuz-U2 (11A511U2)		LC-1/5, Baikonur	Successful	Progress M-17	Mir Logistics
2 April 1993, 14:30	Soyuz-U (11A511U)		LC-16/2, Plesetsk	Successful	Kosmos 2240 (Yantar-4K2)	
6 April 1993, 19:07	Molniya-M (8K78M)		LC-43/4, Plesetsk	Successful	Kosmos 2241 (Oko)	
21 April 1993, 00:23	Molniya-M (8K78M)		LC-43/4, Plesetsk	Successful	Molniya 3-57L	
27 April 1993, 10:35	Soyuz-U (11A511U)		LC-31/6, Baikonur	Successful	Kosmos 2243 (Yantar-1KFT)	
21 May 1993, 09:15	Soyuz-U (11A511U)		LC-16/2, Plesetsk	Successful	Resurs F-17	
22 May 1993, 06:41	Soyuz-U2 (11A511U2)		LC-1/5, Baikonur	Successful	Progress M-18	Mir Logistics
26 May 1993, 03:23	Molniya-M (8K78M)		LC-43/4, Plesetsk	Successful	Molniya 1-86	
25 June 1993, 08:20	Soyuz-U (11A511U)		LC-16/2, Plesetsk	Successful	Resurs F-18	
1 July 1993, 14:32	Soyuz-U2 (11A511U2)		LC-1/5, Baikonur	Successful	Soyuz TM-17	Crewed orbital flight, 3 cosmonauts Docked to Mir
14 July 1993, 16:40	Soyuz-U (11A511U)		LC-43/3, Plesetsk	Successful	Kosmos 2259 (Yantar-4K2)	
22 July 1993, 08:45	Soyuz-U (11A511U)		LC-43/3, Plesetsk	Successful	Kosmos 2260 (Zenit-8)	
4 August 1993, 00:52	Molniya-M (8K78M)		LC-43/3, Plesetsk	Successful	Molniya 3-58L	
10 August 1993, 14:53	Molniya-M (8K78M)		LC-16/2, Plesetsk	Successful	Kosmos 2261 (Oko)	
10 August 1993, 22:23	Soyuz-U (11A511U)		LC-1/5, Baikonur	Successful	Progress M-19	Mir Logistics
24 August 1993, 10:45	Soyuz-U (11A511U)		LC-16/2, Plesetsk	Successful	Resurs F-19	
7 September 1993, 13:25	Soyuz-U2 (11A511U2)		LC-31/6, Baikonur	Successful	Kosmos 2262 (Don)	
11 October 1993, 21:33	Soyuz-U (11A511U)		LC-1/5, Baikonur	Successful	Progress M-20	Mir Logistics
5 November 1993, 08:25	Soyuz-U (11A511U)		LC-1/5, Baikonur	Successful	Kosmos 2267 (Yantar-4KS1M)	
22 December 1993, 20:37	Molniya-M (8K78M)		LC-43/3, Plesetsk	Successful	Molniya 1-87	
== 1994 ==
8 January 1994, 10:05	Soyuz-U2 (11A511U2)		LC-1/5, Baikonur	Successful	Soyuz TM-18	Crewed orbital flight, 3 cosmonauts Docked to Mir
28 January 1994, 02:12	Soyuz-U (11A511U)		LC-1/5, Baikonur	Successful	Progress M-21	Mir Logistics
17 March 1994, 16:30	Soyuz-U (11A511U)		LC-43/4, Plesetsk	Successful	Kosmos 2274 (Yantar)	
22 March 1994, 04:54	Soyuz-U (11A511U)		LC-1/5, Baikonur	Successful	Progress M-22	Mir Logistics
28 April 1994, 17:14	Soyuz-U2 (11A511U2)		LC-31/6, Baikonur	Successful	Kosmos 2280 (Yantar)	
22 May 1994, 04:30	Soyuz-U (11A511U)		LC-1/5, Baikonur	Successful	Progress M-23	Mir Logistics
22 May 1994, 04:30	Soyuz-U (11A511U)		LC-1/5, Baikonur	Successful	VBK Raduga	
7 June 1994, 07:20	Soyuz-U (11A511U)		LC-16/2, Plesetsk	Successful	Kosmos 2281 (Zenit-8)	
14 June 1994, 16:05	Soyuz-U (11A511U)		LC-43/3, Plesetsk	Successful	Foton-9	
1 July 1994, 12:24	Soyuz-U2 (11A511U2)		LC-1/5, Baikonur	Successful	Soyuz TM-19	Crewed orbital flight, 2 cosmonauts Docked to Mir
20 July 1994, 17:35	Soyuz-U (11A511U)		LC-43/4, Plesetsk	Successful	Kosmos 2283 (Yantar)	
29 July 1994, 09:30	Soyuz-U (11A511U)		LC-31/6, Baikonur	Successful	Kosmos 2284 (Yantar)	
5 August 1994, 01:12	Molniya-M (8K78M)		LC-16/2, Plesetsk	Successful	Kosmos 2286 (Oko)	
23 August 1994, 14:30	Molniya-M (8K78M)		LC-43/4, Plesetsk	Successful	Molniya 3-46	
25 August 1994, 14:25	Soyuz-U (11A511U)		LC-1/5, Baikonur	Successful	Progress M-24	Mir Logistics
3 October 1994, 22:42	Soyuz-U2 (11A511U2)		LC-1/5, Baikonur	Successful	Soyuz TM-20	Crewed orbital flight, 3 cosmonauts Docked to Mir
11 November 1994, 19:15	Soyuz-U (11A511U)		LC-1/5, Baikonur	Successful	Progress M-25	Mir Logistics
14 December 1994, 14:21	Molniya-M (8K78M)		LC-43/4, Plesetsk	Successful	Molniya 1-88	
29 December 1994, 11:30	Soyuz-U2 (11A511U2)		LC-31/6, Baikonur	Successful	Kosmos 2305 (Yantar)	
