= List of Kosmos satellites (2001–2250) =

The designation Kosmos (Russian: Космос meaning Cosmos) is a generic name given to a large number of Soviet, and subsequently Russian, satellites, the first of which was launched in 1962. Satellites given Kosmos designations include military spacecraft, failed probes to the Moon and the planets, prototypes for crewed spacecraft, and scientific spacecraft. This is a list of satellites with Kosmos designations between 2001 and 2250.

Designation	Type	Launch date (GMT)	Carrier rocket	Function	Decay/Destruction*	Remarks
Kosmos 2001	US-K	14 February 1989; 04:21	Molniya-M 8K78M	Missile defence	22 September 2008	
Kosmos 2002	Duga-K	14 February 1989; 17:00	Kosmos-3M 11K65M	Calibration	15 October 1989	
Kosmos 2003	Zenit-8	17 February 1989; 14:59	Soyuz-U 11A511U	Reconnaissance	3 March 1989	
Kosmos 2004	Parus	22 February 1989; 03:28	Kosmos-3M 11K65M	Navigation, Communication	in orbit	
Kosmos 2005	Yantar-4K2	2 March 1989; 18:59	Soyuz-U 11A511U	Reconnaissance	25 April 1989	
Kosmos 2006	Zenit-8	16 March 1989; 14:59	Soyuz-U 11A511U	Reconnaissance	31 March 1989	
Kosmos 2007	Yantar-4KS1	23 March 1989; 12:25	Soyuz-U 11A511U	Reconnaissance	22 September 1989	
Kosmos 2008	Strela-1M	24 March 1989; 13:38	Kosmos-3M 11K65M	Communication	in orbit	
Kosmos 2009	Strela-1M	24 March 1989; 13:38	Kosmos-3M 11K65M	Communication	in orbit	
Kosmos 2010	Strela-1M	24 March 1989; 13:38	Kosmos-3M 11K65M	Communication	in orbit	
Kosmos 2011	Strela-1M	24 March 1989; 13:38	Kosmos-3M 11K65M	Communication	in orbit	
Kosmos 2012	Strela-1M	24 March 1989; 13:38	Kosmos-3M 11K65M	Communication	in orbit	
Kosmos 2013	Strela-1M	24 March 1989; 13:38	Kosmos-3M 11K65M	Communication	in orbit	
Kosmos 2014	Strela-1M	24 March 1989; 13:38	Kosmos-3M 11K65M	Communication	in orbit	
Kosmos 2015	Strela-1M	24 March 1989; 13:38	Kosmos-3M 11K65M	Communication	in orbit	
Kosmos 2016	Parus	4 April 1989; 18:36	Kosmos-3M 11K65M	Navigation, Communication	in orbit	
Kosmos 2017	Zenit-8	6 April 1989; 14:00	Soyuz-U 11A511U	Reconnaissance	19 April 1989	
Kosmos 2018	Yantar-4K2	20 April 1989; 18:29	Soyuz-U 11A511U	Reconnaissance	19 June 1989	
Kosmos 2019	Zenit-8	5 May 1989; 13:00	Soyuz-U 11A511U	Reconnaissance	18 May 1989	
Kosmos 2020	Yantar-4K2	17 May 1989; 13:00	Soyuz-U 11A511U	Reconnaissance	15 July 1989	
Kosmos 2021	Yantar-1KFT	24 May 1989; 10:30	Soyuz-U 11A511U	Reconnaissance	6 July 1989	
Kosmos 2022	Glonass	31 May 1989; 08:31	Proton-K/DM-2 8K72K	Navigation	in orbit	
Kosmos 2023	Glonass	31 May 1989; 08:31	Proton-K/DM-2 8K72K	Navigation	in orbit	
Kosmos 2024	Etalon	31 May 1989; 08:31	Proton-K/DM-2 8K72K	Geodesy	in orbit	
Kosmos 2025	Zenit-8	1 June 1989; 12:59	Soyuz-U 11A511U	Reconnaissance	15 June 1989	
Kosmos 2026	Parus	7 June 1989; 05:12	Kosmos-3M 11K65M	Navigation, Communication	in orbit	
Kosmos 2027	Taifun-1	14 June 1989; 12:30	Kosmos-3M 11K65M	Radar target	14 April 1992	
Kosmos 2028	Zenit-8	16 June 1989; 09:30	Soyuz-U 11A511U	Reconnaissance	6 July 1989	
Kosmos 2029	Zenit-8	5 July 1989; 08:00	Soyuz-U 11A511U	Reconnaissance	19 July 1989	
Kosmos 2030	Yantar-4K2	12 July 1989; 15:00	Soyuz-U 11A511U	Reconnaissance	29 July 1989	
Kosmos 2031	Orlets-1	18 July 1989; 12:10	Soyuz-U2 11A511U2	Reconnaissance	15 September 1989	
Kosmos 2032	Zenit-8	20 July 1989; 08:59	Soyuz-U 11A511U	Reconnaissance	3 August 1989	
Kosmos 2033	US-PM	24 July 1989; 00:00	Tsyklon-2 11K69	Reconnaissance	6 January 1991	
Kosmos 2034	Parus	25 July 1989; 07:48	Kosmos-3M 11K65M	Navigation, Communication	in orbit	
Kosmos 2035	Zenit-8	2 August 1989; 11:29	Soyuz-U 11A511U	Reconnaissance	16 August 1989	
Kosmos 2036	Zenit-8	22 August 1989; 12:59	Soyuz-U 11A511U	Reconnaissance	5 September 1989	
Kosmos 2037	Geo-IK	28 August 1989; 00:14	Tsyklon-3 11K68	Geodesy	in orbit	
Kosmos 2038	Strela-3	14 September 1989; 09:49	Tsyklon-3 11K68	Communication	in orbit	
Kosmos 2039	Strela-3	14 September 1989; 09:49	Tsyklon-3 11K68	Communication	in orbit	
Kosmos 2040	Strela-3	14 September 1989; 09:49	Tsyklon-3 11K68	Communication	in orbit	
Kosmos 2041	Strela-3	14 September 1989; 09:49	Tsyklon-3 11K68	Communication	in orbit	
Kosmos 2042	Strela-3	14 September 1989; 09:49	Tsyklon-3 11K68	Communication	in orbit	
Kosmos 2043	Strela-3	14 September 1989; 09:49	Tsyklon-3 11K68	Communication	in orbit	
Kosmos 2044	Bion	15 September 1989; 06:30	Soyuz-U 11A511U	Biological	29 September 1989	
Kosmos 2045	Zenit-8	22 September 1989; 08:00	Soyuz-U 11A511U	Reconnaissance	2 October 1989	
Kosmos 2046	US-PM	27 September 1989; 16:20	Tsyklon-2 11K69	Reconnaissance	16 April 1991	
Kosmos 2047	Yantar-4K2	3 October 1989; 14:59	Soyuz-U 11A511U	Reconnaissance	21 November 1989	
Kosmos 2048	Zenit-8	17 October 1989; 13:00	Soyuz-U 11A511U	Reconnaissance	26 October 1989	
Kosmos 2049	Yantar-4KS1	17 November 1989; 10:50	Soyuz-U 11A511U	Reconnaissance	19 June 1990	
Kosmos 2050	US-K	23 November 1989; 20:35	Molniya-M 8K78M	Missile defence	in orbit	
Kosmos 2051	US-PM	24 November 1989; 23:22	Tsyklon-2 11K69	Reconnaissance	21 January 1991	
Kosmos 2052	Yantar-4K2	30 November 1989; 15:00	Soyuz-U 11A511U	Reconnaissance	24 January 1990	
Kosmos 2053	Kol'tso	27 December 1989; 00:00	Tsyklon-3 11K68	Calibration	2 September 1997	
Kosmos 2054	Luch	27 December 1989; 11:10	Proton-K/DM-2 8K72K	Communication	in orbit	
Kosmos 2055	Zenit-8	17 January 1990; 14:45	Soyuz-U 11A511U	Reconnaissance	29 January 1990	
Kosmos 2056	Strela-2	18 January 1990; 12:52	Kosmos-3M 11K65M	Communication	in orbit	
Kosmos 2057	Yantar-4K2	25 January 1990; 17:15	Soyuz-U 11A511U	Reconnaissance	19 March 1990	
Kosmos 2058	Tselina-R	30 January 1990; 11:20	Tsyklon-3 11K68	ELINT	in orbit	
Kosmos 2059	Duga-K	6 February 1990; 16:30	Kosmos-3M 11K65M	Calibration	12 November 1990	
Kosmos 2060	US-PM	14 March 1990; 15:27	Tsyklon-2 11K69	Reconnaissance	1 September 1991	
Kosmos 2061	Parus	20 March 1990; 00:25	Kosmos-3M 11K65M	Navigation, Communication	in orbit	
Kosmos 2062	Zenit-8	22 March 1990; 07:20	Soyuz-U 11A511U	Reconnaissance	5 April 1990	
Kosmos 2063	US-K	27 March 1990; 16:40	Molniya-M 8K78M	Missile defence	in orbit	
Kosmos 2064	Strela-1M	6 April 1990; 03:13	Kosmos-3M 11K65M	Communication	in orbit	
Kosmos 2065	Strela-1M	6 April 1990; 03:13	Kosmos-3M 11K65M	Communication	in orbit	
Kosmos 2066	Strela-1M	6 April 1990; 03:13	Kosmos-3M 11K65M	Communication	in orbit	
Kosmos 2067	Strela-1M	6 April 1990; 03:13	Kosmos-3M 11K65M	Communication	in orbit	
Kosmos 2068	Strela-1M	6 April 1990; 03:13	Kosmos-3M 11K65M	Communication	in orbit	
Kosmos 2069	Strela-1M	6 April 1990; 03:13	Kosmos-3M 11K65M	Communication	in orbit	
Kosmos 2070	Strela-1M	6 April 1990; 03:13	Kosmos-3M 11K65M	Communication	in orbit	
Kosmos 2071	Strela-1M	6 April 1990; 03:13	Kosmos-3M 11K65M	Communication	in orbit	
Kosmos 2072	Yantar-4KS1	13 April 1990; 18:53	Soyuz-U 11A511U	Reconnaissance	21 November 1990	
Kosmos 2073	Zenit-8	17 April 1990; 08:00	Soyuz-U 11A511U	Reconnaissance	28 April 1990	
Kosmos 2074	Parus	20 April 1990; 18:41	Kosmos-3M 11K65M	Navigation, Communication	in orbit	
Kosmos 2075	Romb	25 April 1990; 13:00	Kosmos-3M 11K65M	Calibration	20 February 1992	
Kosmos 2076	US-K	28 April 1990; 11:37	Molniya-M 8K78M	Missile defence	in orbit	
Kosmos 2077	Yantar-4K2	7 May 1990; 18:39	Soyuz-U 11A511U	Reconnaissance	4 July 1990	
Kosmos 2078	Yantar-1KFT	15 May 1990; 09:55	Soyuz-U 11A511U	Reconnaissance	28 June 1990	
Kosmos 2079	Glonass	19 May 1990; 08:32	Proton-K/DM-2 8K72K	Navigation	in orbit	
Kosmos 2080	Glonass	19 May 1990; 08:32	Proton-K/DM-2 8K72K	Navigation	in orbit	
Kosmos 2081	Glonass	19 May 1990; 08:32	Proton-K/DM-2 8K72K	Navigation	in orbit	
Kosmos 2082	Tselina-2	22 May 1990; 05:14	Zenit-2 11K77	ELINT	in orbit	
Kosmos 2083	Zenit-8	19 June 1990; 08:45	Soyuz-U 11A511U	Reconnaissance	3 July 1990	
Kosmos 2084	US-K	21 June 1990; 20:45	Molniya-M 8K78M	Missile defence	in orbit	
Kosmos 2085	Potok	18 July 1990; 21:46	Proton-K/DM-2 8K72K	Communication	in orbit	
Kosmos 2086	Zenit-8	20 July 1990; 08:40	Soyuz-U 11A511U	Reconnaissance	3 August 1990	
Kosmos 2087	US-K	25 July 1990; 18:13	Molniya-M 8K78M	Missile defence	in orbit	
Kosmos 2088	Geo-IK	30 July 1990; 00:06	Tsyklon-3 11K68	Geodesy	in orbit	
Kosmos 2089	Yantar-4K2	3 August 1990; 19:45	Soyuz-U 11A511U	Reconnaissance	1 October 1990	
Kosmos 2090	Strela-3	8 August 1990; 04:15	Tsyklon-3 11K68	Communication	in orbit	
Kosmos 2091	Strela-3	8 August 1990; 04:15	Tsyklon-3 11K68	Communication	in orbit	
Kosmos 2092	Strela-3	8 August 1990; 04:15	Tsyklon-3 11K68	Communication	in orbit	
Kosmos 2093	Strela-3	8 August 1990; 04:15	Tsyklon-3 11K68	Communication	in orbit	
Kosmos 2094	Strela-3	8 August 1990; 04:15	Tsyklon-3 11K68	Communication	in orbit	
Kosmos 2095	Strela-3	8 August 1990; 04:15	Tsyklon-3 11K68	Communication	in orbit	
Kosmos 2096	US-PM	23 August 1990; 16:17	Tsyklon-2 11K69	Reconnaissance	30 August 1992	
Kosmos 2097	US-K	28 August 1990; 07:49	Molniya-M 8K78M	Missile defence	in orbit	
Kosmos 2098	Taifun-1	28 August 1990; 15:45	Kosmos-3M 11K65M	Radar target	in orbit	
Kosmos 2099	Zenit-8	31 August 1990; 08:00	Soyuz-U 11A511U	Reconnaissance	14 September 1990	
Kosmos 2100	Parus	14 September 1990; 05:59	Kosmos-3M 11K65M	Navigation, Communication	in orbit	
Kosmos 2101	Orlets-1	1 October 1990; 11:00	Soyuz-U2 11A511U2	Reconnaissance	30 November 1990	
Kosmos 2102	Yantar-4K2	16 October 1990; 19:00	Soyuz-U 11A511U	Reconnaissance	12 December 1990	
Kosmos 2103	US-PM	14 November 1990; 06:33	Tsyklon-2 11K69	Reconnaissance	3 April 1991	
Kosmos 2104	Zenit-8	16 November 1990; 16:30	Soyuz-U 11A511U	Reconnaissance	4 December 1990	
Kosmos 2105	US-K	20 November 1990; 02:33	Molniya-M 8K78M	Missile defence	16 January 2008	
Kosmos 2106	Kol'tso	28 November 1990; 16:33	Tsyklon-3 11K68	Calibration	7 April 2000	
Kosmos 2107	US-PM	4 December 1990; 00:48	Tsyklon-2 11K69	Reconnaissance	5 April 1992	
Kosmos 2108	Yantar-4K2	4 December 1990; 18:30	Soyuz-U 11A511U	Reconnaissance	28 January 1991	
Kosmos 2109	Glonass	8 December 1990; 02:43	Proton-K/DM-2 8K72K	Navigation	in orbit	
Kosmos 2110	Glonass	8 December 1990; 02:43	Proton-K/DM-2 8K72K	Navigation	in orbit	
Kosmos 2111	Glonass	8 December 1990; 02:43	Proton-K/DM-2 8K72K	Navigation	in orbit	
Kosmos 2112	Strela-2	10 December 1990; 07:54	Kosmos-3M 11K65M	Communication	in orbit	
Kosmos 2113	Yantar-4KS1	21 December 1990; 06:20	Soyuz-U 11A511U	Reconnaissance	11 June 1991	
Kosmos 2114	Strela-3	22 December 1990; 07:28	Tsyklon-3 11K68	Communication	in orbit	
Kosmos 2115	Strela-3	22 December 1990; 07:28	Tsyklon-3 11K68	Communication	in orbit	
Kosmos 2116	Strela-3	22 December 1990; 07:28	Tsyklon-3 11K68	Communication	in orbit	
Kosmos 2117	Strela-3	22 December 1990; 07:28	Tsyklon-3 11K68	Communication	in orbit	
Kosmos 2118	Strela-3	22 December 1990; 07:28	Tsyklon-3 11K68	Communication	in orbit	
Kosmos 2119	Strela-3	22 December 1990; 07:28	Tsyklon-3 11K68	Communication	in orbit	
Kosmos 2120	Zenit-8	26 December 1990; 11:10	Soyuz-U 11A511U	Reconnaissance	17 January 1991	
Kosmos 2121	Zenit-8	17 January 1991; 10:30	Soyuz-U 11A511U	Reconnaissance	10 February 1991	
Kosmos 2122	US-PM	18 January 1991; 11:34	Tsyklon-2 11K69	Reconnaissance	28 March 1993	
Kosmos 2123	Tsikada	5 February 1991; 02:36	Kosmos-3M 11K65M	Navigation	in orbit	
Kosmos 2124	Yantar-4K2	7 February 1991; 18:15	Soyuz-U 11A511U	Reconnaissance	7 April 1991	
Kosmos 2125	Strela-1M	12 February 1991; 02:44	Kosmos-3M 11K65M	Communication	in orbit	
Kosmos 2126	Strela-1M	12 February 1991; 02:44	Kosmos-3M 11K65M	Communication	in orbit	
Kosmos 2127	Strela-1M	12 February 1991; 02:44	Kosmos-3M 11K65M	Communication	in orbit	
Kosmos 2128	Strela-1M	12 February 1991; 02:44	Kosmos-3M 11K65M	Communication	in orbit	
Kosmos 2129	Strela-1M	12 February 1991; 02:44	Kosmos-3M 11K65M	Communication	in orbit	
Kosmos 2130	Strela-1M	12 February 1991; 02:44	Kosmos-3M 11K65M	Communication	in orbit	
Kosmos 2131	Strela-1M	12 February 1991; 02:44	Kosmos-3M 11K65M	Communication	in orbit	
Kosmos 2132	Strela-1M	12 February 1991; 02:44	Kosmos-3M 11K65M	Communication	in orbit	
Kosmos 2133	US-KMO	14 February 1991; 08:31	Proton-K/DM-2 8K72K	Missile defence	in orbit	
Kosmos 2134	Yantar-1KFT	15 February 1991; 09:30	Soyuz-U 11A511U	Reconnaissance	1 April 1991	
Kosmos 2135	Parus	26 February 1991; 04:53	Kosmos-3M 11K65M	Navigation, Communication	in orbit	
Kosmos 2136	Zenit-8	6 March 1991; 15:30	Soyuz-U 11A511U	Reconnaissance	20 March 1991	
Kosmos 2137	Taifun-1B	19 March 1991; 14:30	Kosmos-3M 11K65M	Radar target	3 April 1995	
Kosmos 2138	Yantar-4K2	26 March 1991; 13:45	Soyuz-U 11A511U	Reconnaissance	24 May 1991	
Kosmos 2139	Glonass	4 April 1991; 10:47	Proton-K/DM-2 8K72K	Navigation	in orbit	
Kosmos 2140	Glonass	4 April 1991; 10:47	Proton-K/DM-2 8K72K	Navigation	in orbit	
Kosmos 2141	Glonass	4 April 1991; 10:47	Proton-K/DM-2 8K72K	Navigation	in orbit	
Kosmos 2142	Parus	16 April 1991; 07:21	Kosmos-3M 11K65M	Navigation, Communication	in orbit	
Kosmos 2143	Strela-3	16 May 1991; 21:40	Tsyklon-3 11K68	Communication	in orbit	
Kosmos 2144	Strela-3	16 May 1991; 21:40	Tsyklon-3 11K68	Communication	in orbit	
Kosmos 2145	Strela-3	16 May 1991; 21:40	Tsyklon-3 11K68	Communication	in orbit	
Kosmos 2146	Strela-3	16 May 1991; 21:40	Tsyklon-3 11K68	Communication	in orbit	
Kosmos 2147	Strela-3	16 May 1991; 21:40	Tsyklon-3 11K68	Communication	in orbit	
Kosmos 2148	Strela-3	16 May 1991; 21:40	Tsyklon-3 11K68	Communication	in orbit	
Kosmos 2149	Yantar-4K2	24 May 1991; 15:29	Soyuz-U 11A511U	Reconnaissance	4 July 1991	
Kosmos 2150	Strela-2	11 June 1991; 05:41	Kosmos-3M 11K65M	Communication	in orbit	
Kosmos 2151	Tselina-R	13 June 1991; 15:41	Tsyklon-3 11K68	ELINT	in orbit	
Kosmos 2152	Zenit-8	9 July 1991; 09:40	Soyuz-U 11A511U	Reconnaissance	23 July 1991	
Kosmos 2153	Yantar-4KS1M	10 July 1991; 14:00	Soyuz-U 11A511U	Reconnaissance	13 March 1992	
Kosmos 2154	Parus	22 August 1991; 12:35	Kosmos-3M 11K65M	Navigation, Communication	in orbit	
Kosmos 2155	US-KS	13 September 1991; 17:51	Proton-K/DM-2 8K72K	Missile defence	in orbit	
Kosmos 2156	Yantar-4K2	19 September 1991; 16:20	Soyuz-U 11A511U	Reconnaissance	17 November 1991	
Kosmos 2157	Strela-3	28 September 1991; 07:05	Tsyklon-3 11K68	Communication	in orbit	
Kosmos 2158	Strela-3	28 September 1991; 07:05	Tsyklon-3 11K68	Communication	in orbit	
Kosmos 2159	Strela-3	28 September 1991; 07:05	Tsyklon-3 11K68	Communication	in orbit	
Kosmos 2160	Strela-3	28 September 1991; 07:05	Tsyklon-3 11K68	Communication	in orbit	
Kosmos 2161	Strela-3	28 September 1991; 07:05	Tsyklon-3 11K68	Communication	in orbit	
Kosmos 2162	Strela-3	28 September 1991; 07:05	Tsyklon-3 11K68	Communication	in orbit	
Kosmos 2163	Orlets-1	9 October 1991; 13:15	Soyuz-U2 11A511U2	Reconnaissance	7 December 1991	
Kosmos 2164	Taifun-1B	10 October 1991; 14:00	Kosmos-3M 11K65M	Radar target	12 December 1992	
Kosmos 2165	Strela-3	12 November 1991; 20:09	Tsyklon-3 11K68	Communication	in orbit	
Kosmos 2166	Strela-3	12 November 1991; 20:09	Tsyklon-3 11K68	Communication	in orbit	
Kosmos 2167	Strela-3	12 November 1991; 20:09	Tsyklon-3 11K68	Communication	in orbit	
Kosmos 2168	Strela-3	12 November 1991; 20:09	Tsyklon-3 11K68	Communication	in orbit	
Kosmos 2169	Strela-3	12 November 1991; 20:09	Tsyklon-3 11K68	Communication	in orbit	
Kosmos 2170	Strela-3	12 November 1991; 20:09	Tsyklon-3 11K68	Communication	in orbit	
Kosmos 2171	Yantar-4K2	20 November 1991; 19:15	Soyuz-U 11A511U	Reconnaissance	17 January 1992	
Kosmos 2172	Potok	22 November 1991; 13:27	Proton-K/DM-2 8K72K	Communication	in orbit	
Kosmos 2173	Parus	27 November 1991; 03:30	Kosmos-3M 11K65M	Navigation, Communication	in orbit	
Kosmos 2174	Yantar-1KFT	17 December 1991; 11:00	Soyuz-U 11A511U	Reconnaissance	30 January 1992	
Kosmos 2175	Yantar-4K2	21 January 1992; 15:00	Soyuz-U 11A511U	Reconnaissance	20 March 1992	First satellite launched by the Russian Federation
Kosmos 2176	US-K	24 January 1992; 01:18	Molniya-M 8K78M	Missile defence	17 January 2012	
Kosmos 2177	Glonass	29 January 1992; 22:19	Proton-K/DM-2 8K72K	Navigation	in orbit	
Kosmos 2178	Glonass	29 January 1992; 22:19	Proton-K/DM-2 8K72K	Navigation	in orbit	
Kosmos 2179	Glonass	29 January 1992; 22:19	Proton-K/DM-2 8K72K	Navigation	in orbit	
Kosmos 2180	Parus	17 February 1992; 22:05	Kosmos-3M 11K65M	Navigation, Communication	in orbit	
Kosmos 2181	Tsikada	9 March 1992; 22:35	Kosmos-3M 11K65M	Navigation	in orbit	
Kosmos 2182	Yantar-4K2	1 April 1992; 14:18	Soyuz-U 11A511U	Reconnaissance	30 May 1992	
Kosmos 2183	Yantar-4KS1M	8 April 1992; 12:20	Soyuz-U 11A511U	Reconnaissance	16 February 1993	
Kosmos 2184	Parus	15 April 1992; 07:17	Kosmos-3M 11K65M	Navigation, Communication	in orbit	
Kosmos 2185	Yantar-1KFT	29 April 1992; 10:10	Soyuz-U 11A511U	Reconnaissance	11 June 1992	
Kosmos 2186	Yantar-4K2	28 May 1992; 19:09	Soyuz-U 11A511U	Reconnaissance	24 July 1992	
Kosmos 2187	Strela-1M	3 June 1992; 00:50	Kosmos-3M 11K65M	Communication	in orbit	
Kosmos 2188	Strela-1M	3 June 1992; 00:50	Kosmos-3M 11K65M	Communication	in orbit	
Kosmos 2189	Strela-1M	3 June 1992; 00:50	Kosmos-3M 11K65M	Communication	in orbit	
Kosmos 2190	Strela-1M	3 June 1992; 00:50	Kosmos-3M 11K65M	Communication	in orbit	
Kosmos 2191	Strela-1M	3 June 1992; 00:50	Kosmos-3M 11K65M	Communication	in orbit	
Kosmos 2192	Strela-1M	3 June 1992; 00:50	Kosmos-3M 11K65M	Communication	in orbit	
Kosmos 2193	Strela-1M	3 June 1992; 00:50	Kosmos-3M 11K65M	Communication	in orbit	
Kosmos 2194	Strela-1M	3 June 1992; 00:50	Kosmos-3M 11K65M	Communication	in orbit	
Kosmos 2195	Parus	1 July 1992; 20:16	Kosmos-3M 11K65M	Navigation, Communication	in orbit	
Kosmos 2196	US-K	8 July 1992; 09:53	Molniya-M 8K78M	Missile defence	27 September 2016	
Kosmos 2197	Strela-3	13 July 1992; 17:41	Tsyklon-3 11K68	Communication	in orbit	
Kosmos 2198	Strela-3	13 July 1992; 17:41	Tsyklon-3 11K68	Communication	in orbit	
Kosmos 2199	Gonets-D	13 July 1992; 17:41	Tsyklon-3 11K68	Communication	in orbit	
Kosmos 2200	Strela-3	13 July 1992; 17:41	Tsyklon-3 11K68	Communication	in orbit	
Kosmos 2201	Gonets-D	13 July 1992; 17:41	Tsyklon-3 11K68	Communication	in orbit	
Kosmos 2202	Strela-3	13 July 1992; 17:41	Tsyklon-3 11K68	Communication	in orbit	
Kosmos 2203	Yantar-4K2	24 July 1992; 19:40	Soyuz-U 11A511U	Reconnaissance	22 September 1992	
Kosmos 2204	Glonass	30 July 1992; 01:59	Proton-K/DM-2 8K72K	Navigation	in orbit	
Kosmos 2205	Glonass	30 July 1992; 01:59	Proton-K/DM-2 8K72K	Navigation	in orbit	
Kosmos 2206	Glonass	30 July 1992; 01:59	Proton-K/DM-2 8K72K	Navigation	in orbit	
Kosmos 2207	Zenit-8	30 July 1992; 11:00	Soyuz-U 11A511U	Reconnaissance	13 August 1992	
Kosmos 2208	Strela-2	12 August 1992; 05:44	Kosmos-3M 11K65M	Communication	in orbit	
Kosmos 2209	US-KS	10 September 1992; 18:01	Proton-K/DM-2 8K72K	Missile defence	in orbit	
Kosmos 2210	Yantar-4K2	22 September 1992; 16:10	Soyuz-U 11A511U	Reconnaissance	20 November 1992	
Kosmos 2211	Strela-3	20 October 1992; 12:58	Tsyklon-3 11K68	Communication	in orbit	
Kosmos 2212	Strela-3	20 October 1992; 12:58	Tsyklon-3 11K68	Communication	in orbit	
Kosmos 2213	Strela-3	20 October 1992; 12:58	Tsyklon-3 11K68	Communication	in orbit	
Kosmos 2214	Strela-3	20 October 1992; 12:58	Tsyklon-3 11K68	Communication	in orbit	
Kosmos 2215	Strela-3	20 October 1992; 12:58	Tsyklon-3 11K68	Communication	in orbit	
Kosmos 2216	Strela-3	20 October 1992; 12:58	Tsyklon-3 11K68	Communication	in orbit	
Kosmos 2217	US-K	21 October 1992; 10:21	Molniya-M 8K78M	Missile defence	6 November 2010	
Kosmos 2218	Parus	29 October 1992; 10:40	Kosmos-3M 11K65M	Navigation, Communication	in orbit	
Kosmos 2219	Tselina-2	17 November 1992; 07:47	Zenit-2 11K77	ELINT	in orbit	
Kosmos 2220	Yantar-4K2	20 November 1992; 15:29	Soyuz-U 11A511U	Reconnaissance	18 January 1993	
Kosmos 2221	Tselina-D	24 November 1992; 04:09	Tsyklon-3 11K68	ELINT	in orbit	Had an extremely close hypervelocity conjunction with NASA's TIMED satellite on 28 February 2024, avoiding collision by less than 10 meters.
Kosmos 2222	US-K	25 November 1992; 12:18	Molniya-M 8K78M	Missile defence	3 May 2023	
Kosmos 2223	Yantar-4KS1M	9 December 1992; 11:25	Soyuz-U 11A511U	Reconnaissance	16 December 1993	
Kosmos 2224	US-KMO	17 December 1992; 12:45	Proton-K/DM-2 8K72K	Missile defence	in orbit	
Kosmos 2225	Orlets-1	22 December 1992; 12:00	Soyuz-U 11A511U	Reconnaissance	18 February 1993	
Kosmos 2226	Geo-IK	22 December 1992; 12:36	Tsyklon-3 11K68	Geodesy	in orbit	
Kosmos 2227	Tselina-2	25 December 1992; 05:56	Zenit-2 11K77	ELINT	in orbit	
Kosmos 2228	Tselina-D	25 December 1992; 20:07	Tsyklon-3 11K68	ELINT	in orbit	
Kosmos 2229	Bion	29 December 1992; 13:30	Soyuz-U 11A511U	Biological	10 January 1993	
Kosmos 2230	Tsikada	12 January 1993; 11:10	Kosmos-3M 11K65M	Navigation	in orbit	
Kosmos 2231	Yantar-4K2	19 January 1993; 14:49	Soyuz-U 11A511U	Reconnaissance	25 March 1993	
Kosmos 2232	US-K	26 January 1993; 15:55	Molniya-M 8K78M	Missile defence	in orbit	
Kosmos 2233	Parus	9 February 1993; 02:56	Kosmos-3M 11K65M	Navigation, Communication	in orbit	
Kosmos 2234	Glonass	17 February 1993; 20:09	Proton-K/DM-2 8K72K	Navigation	in orbit	
Kosmos 2235	Glonass	17 February 1993; 20:09	Proton-K/DM-2 8K72K	Navigation	in orbit	
Kosmos 2236	Glonass	17 February 1993; 20:09	Proton-K/DM-2 8K72K	Navigation	in orbit	
Kosmos 2237	Tselina-2	26 March 1993; 02:21	Zenit-2 11K77	ELINT	in orbit	
Kosmos 2238	US-PM	30 March 1993; 12:00	Tsyklon-2 11K69	Reconnaissance	10 December 1994	
Kosmos 2239	Parus	1 April 1993; 18:57	Kosmos-3M 11K65M	Navigation, Communication	in orbit	
Kosmos 2240	Yantar-4K2	2 April 1993; 14:30	Soyuz-U 11A511U	Reconnaissance	7 June 1993	
Kosmos 2241	US-K	6 April 1993; 19:07	Molniya-M 8K78M	Missile defence	8 March 2022	
Kosmos 2242	Tselina-R	16 April 1993; 07:49	Tsyklon-3 11K68	ELINT	in orbit	
Kosmos 2243	Yantar-1KFT	27 April 1993; 10:35	Soyuz-U 11A511U	Reconnaissance	6 May 1993	
Kosmos 2244	US-PU	28 April 1993; 03:39	Tsyklon-2 11K69	Reconnaissance	18 March 1995	
Kosmos 2245	Strela-3	11 May 1993; 14:56	Tsyklon-3 11K68	Communication	in orbit	
Kosmos 2246	Strela-3	11 May 1993; 14:56	Tsyklon-3 11K68	Communication	in orbit	
Kosmos 2247	Strela-3	11 May 1993; 14:56	Tsyklon-3 11K68	Communication	in orbit	
Kosmos 2248	Strela-3	11 May 1993; 14:56	Tsyklon-3 11K68	Communication	in orbit	
Kosmos 2249	Strela-3	11 May 1993; 14:56	Tsyklon-3 11K68	Communication	in orbit	
Kosmos 2250	Strela-3	11 May 1993; 14:56	Tsyklon-3 11K68	Communication	in orbit	

* — satellite was destroyed in orbit rather than decaying and burning up in the Earth's atmosphere

== See also ==
- List of USA satellites
