= 1990 in spaceflight =

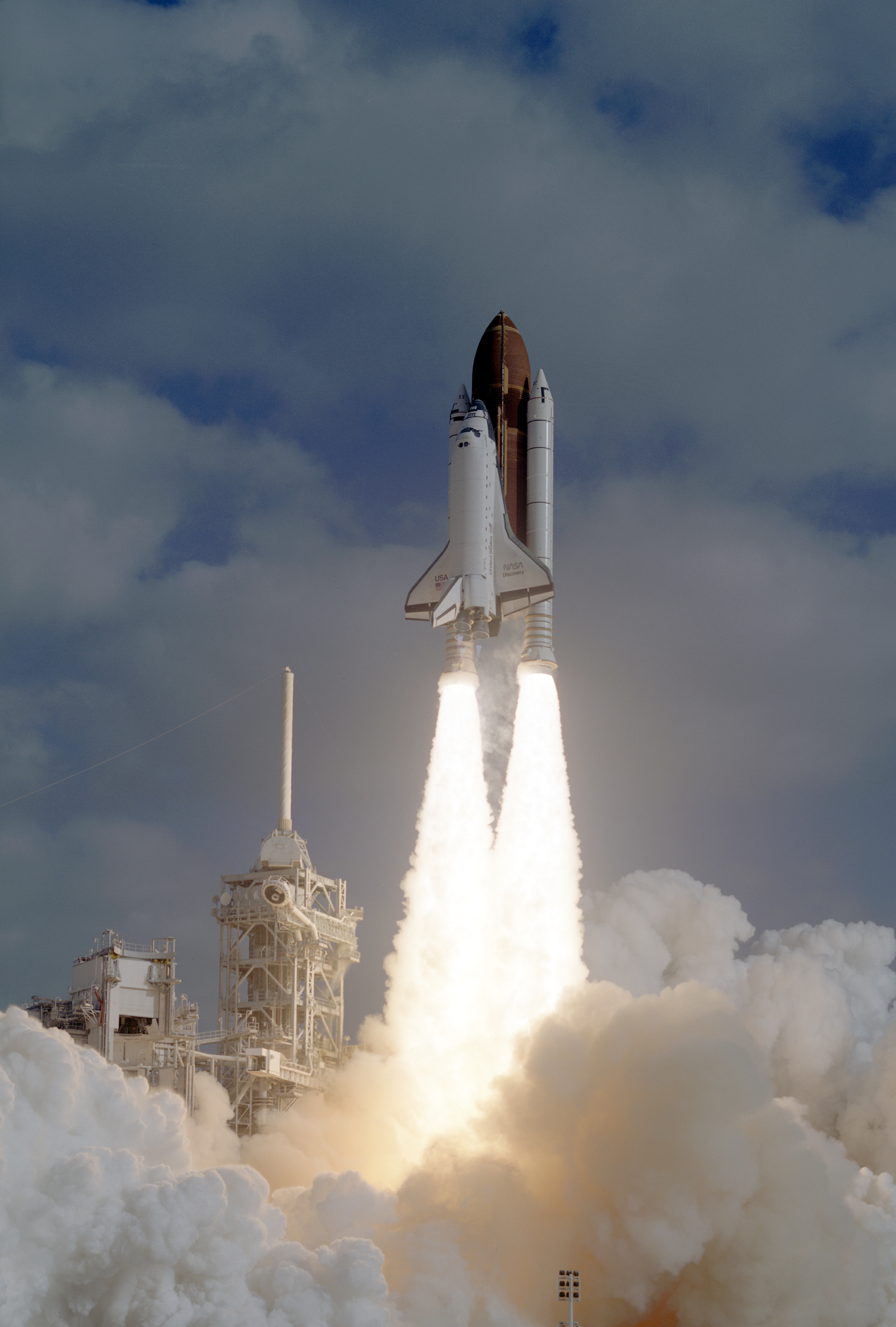
- The launch of Space Shuttle Discovery with the Hubble Space Telescope

Orbital launches
- First: 1 January
- Last: 27 December
- Total: 121
- Successes: 114
- Failures: 5
- Partial failures: 2

National firsts
- Satellite: Pakistan
- Space traveller: Japan

Rockets
- Maiden flights: Ariane 4 40; Ariane 4 42P; Atlas I Commercial Titan III; Delta II 6920; Delta II 7925; Long March 2E; Pegasus Standard
- Retirements: Delta 4925; Long March 4A

Crewed flights
- Orbital: 9
- Total travellers: 39

1990 in spaceflight

The following is an outline of 1990 in spaceflight.

== Launch of Hubble Space Telescope ==
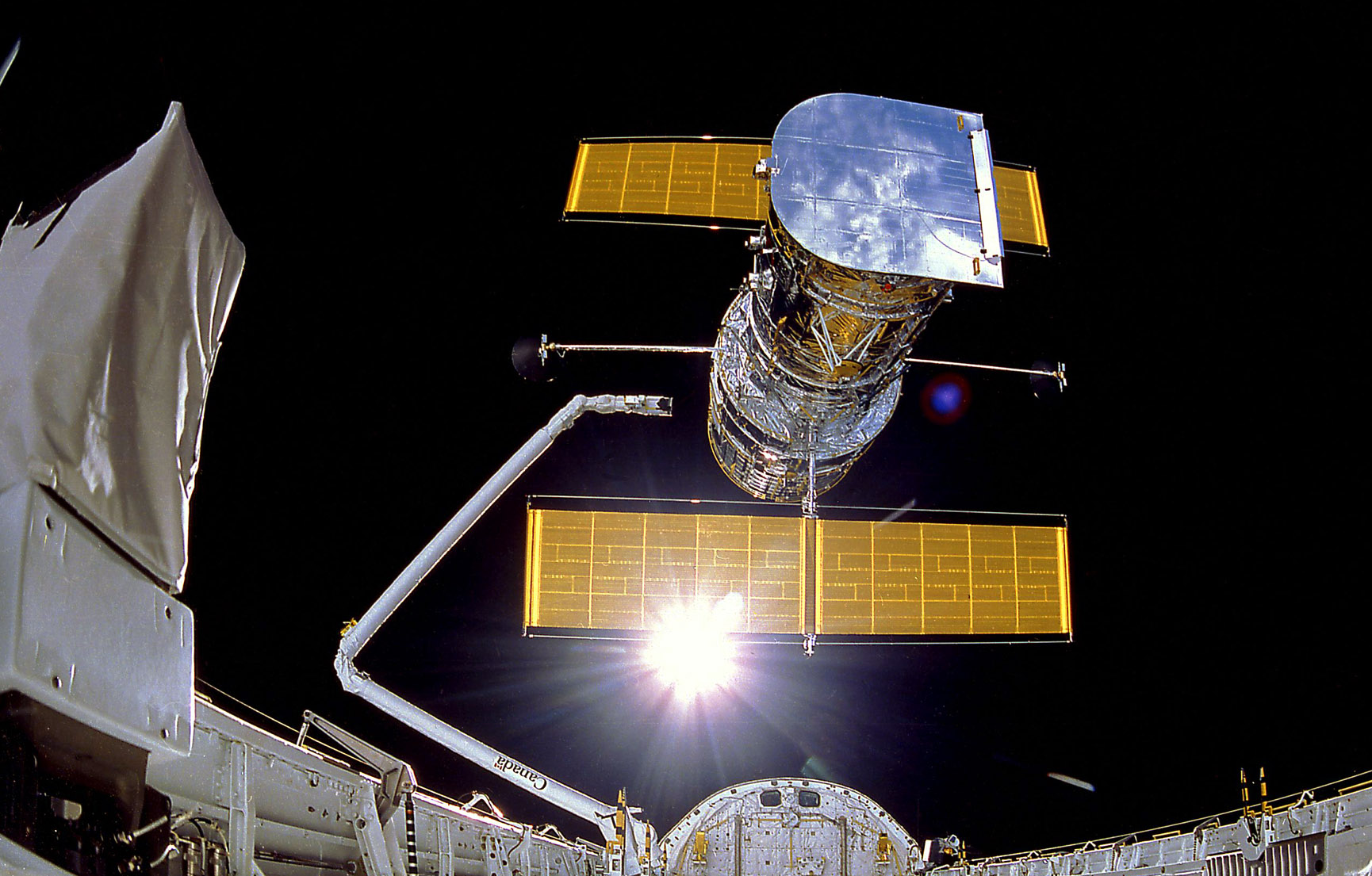
Discovery deploys the Hubble Space Telescope.

STS-31 was the 35th mission of NASA's Space Shuttle program and the tenth flight of the Space Shuttle Discovery. The primary purpose of this mission was the deployment of the Hubble Space Telescope (HST) into low Earth orbit. Discovery lifted off from Launch Complex 39B on April 24, 1990, from Kennedy Space Center, Florida.

== Launches ==
- ← Jan
- Feb
- Mar
- Apr
- May
- Jun
- Jul
- Aug
- Sep
- Oct
- Nov
- Dec →

Date and time (UTC)	Rocket	Flight number	Launch site		LSP	
Date and time (UTC)	Payload (⚀ = CubeSat)	Operator	Orbit	Function	Decay (UTC)	Outcome
Date and time (UTC)	Remarks					
=== January ===
1 January; 00:07 (UTC)	(United States) Commercial Titan III		(United States) Cape Canaveral LC-40		(United States) Martin Marietta	
1 January; 00:07 (UTC)	(United Kingdom) Skynet 4A	MoD	Geosynchronous	Communications	In orbit	Successful; placed in graveyard orbit 20 June 2005
1 January; 00:07 (UTC)	(Japan) JCSAT 2	JSAT	Geosynchronous	Communications	In orbit	Successful; placed in graveyard orbit 2002
1 January; 00:07 (UTC)	Maiden flight of Commercial Titan III					
9 January; 12:35 (UTC)	(United States) Space Shuttle Columbia		(United States) Kennedy LC-39A		(United States)	
9 January; 12:35 (UTC)	(United States) STS-32	NASA	Low Earth	Satellite deployment and retrieval	20 January; 09:35 (UTC)	Successful
9 January; 12:35 (UTC)	(United States) Leasat F5 also known as Syncom IV-5.	NASA	Geosynchronous	Communications	In orbit	Successful; placed in graveyard orbit 24 September 2015.
9 January; 12:35 (UTC)	Crewed orbital flight with 5 astronauts Long Duration Exposure Facility retrieval mission Leasat F5 retired 24 September 2015.					
17 January; 14:45 (UTC)	(Soviet Union) Soyuz-U		(Soviet Union) Plesetsk		(Soviet Union)	
17 January; 14:45 (UTC)	(Soviet Union) Kosmos 2055 (Zenit-8)		Low Earth	Reconnaissance	29 January	Successful
18 January; 12:52 (UTC)	(Soviet Union) Kosmos-3M		(Soviet Union) Plesetsk Site 133/3		(Soviet Union)	
18 January; 12:52 (UTC)	(Soviet Union) Kosmos 2056 (Strela-2M)		Low Earth	Communications	In orbit	Successful; replaced by Kosmos 2208 12 August 1992.
22 January; 01:35 (UTC)	(France) Ariane 4 (40)		(France) Kourou ELA-2		(France) Arianespace	
22 January; 01:35 (UTC)	(France) SPOT 2	CNES	Sun-synchronous	Earth observation	In orbit	Successful; retired July, 2009.
22 January; 01:35 (UTC)	(United Kingdom) UOSAT 3 also known as UoSAT-OSCAR 14	University of Surrey	Sun-synchronous	Communications	In orbit	Successful; retired from active service in 1999 and used as an amateur FM radio relay until 11 November 2003.
22 January; 01:35 (UTC)	(United Kingdom) UOSAT 4	University of Surrey	Sun-synchronous	Communications	In orbit	Spacecraft failure 30 hours after launch
22 January; 01:35 (UTC)	(United States) PACSAT	AMSAT	Sun-synchronous	Communications	In orbit	Operational
22 January; 01:35 (UTC)	(United States) Microsat 2	AMSAT	Sun-synchronous	Communications	In orbit	Operational
22 January; 01:35 (UTC)	(United States) Microsat 3	AMSAT	Sun-synchronous	Communications	In orbit	Operational
22 January; 01:35 (UTC)	(United States) Microsat 4	AMSAT	Sun-synchronous	Communications	In orbit	Operational
22 January; 01:35 (UTC)	Maiden flight of Ariane 4 (40); UOSAT 4 ceased transmitting after 5 hours					
23 January; 02:52	(Soviet Union) Molniya-M/ML		(Soviet Union) Plesetsk		(Soviet Union)	
23 January; 02:52	(Soviet Union) Molniya 3-53L		Molniya	Communications	23 June 2003	Successful
24 January; 11:46	(Japan) Mu-3S-II		(Japan) Uchinoura		(Japan) ISAS	
24 January; 11:46	(Japan) Hiten	ISAS		Lunar probe	11 April 1993	Successful
24 January; 11:46	(Japan) Hagoromo	ISAS	Selenocentric	Lunar orbiter	In orbit	Spacecraft failure
24 January; 11:46	First Japanese lunar mission Hagoromo suffered a transmitter malfunction prior to selenocentric orbit injection					
24 January; 22:55:01 (UTC)	(United States) Delta II 6925		(United States) Cape Canaveral LC-17A		(United States) McDonnell Douglas	
24 January; 22:55:01 (UTC)	(United States) GPS II-6 (USA-50)	US Air Force	Medium Earth	Navigation	In orbit	Successful
25 January; 17:15 (UTC)	(Soviet Union) Soyuz-U		(Soviet Union) Plesetsk Site 16/2		(Soviet Union)	
25 January; 17:15 (UTC)	(Soviet Union) Kosmos 2057 (Yantar-4K2)		Low Earth	Reconnaissance	19 March 1990	Successful
30 January; 11:20 (UTC)	(Soviet Union) Tsyklon-3		(Soviet Union) Plesetsk Site 32		(Soviet Union)	
30 January; 11:20 (UTC)	(Soviet Union) Kosmos 2058 (Tselina-R)		Low Earth	ELINT	In orbit	Operational
=== February ===
4 February; 12:27:03 (UTC)	(China) Long March 3		(China) Xichang LC-1		(China)	
4 February; 12:27:03 (UTC)	(China) DFH-2 A-4		Geosynchronous	Communications	In orbit	Successful; retired in the early 1990s
6 February; 16:30	(Soviet Union) Kosmos-3M		(Soviet Union) Plesetsk Site 132/2		(Soviet Union)	
6 February; 16:30	(Soviet Union) Kosmos 2059 (Taifun-2)		Low Earth	Radar calibration	12 November	Successful
7 February; 01:33	(Japan) H-I		(Japan) Tanegashima LA-N		(Japan) Mitsubishi	
7 February; 01:33	(Japan) MOS 1B	NASDA	Low Earth	Earth observation	In orbit	Operational
7 February; 01:33	(Japan) DEBUT		Low Earth	Technology demonstration	In orbit	Successful
7 February; 01:33	(Japan) JAS-1B		Low Earth	Communications	In orbit	Operational
11 February; 06:16	(Soviet Union) Soyuz-U2		(Soviet Union) Baikonur Site 1/5		(Soviet Union)	
11 February; 06:16	(Soviet Union) Soyuz TM-9		Low Earth (Mir)	Mir EO-9	9 August; 07:33	Successful
11 February; 06:16	Crewed orbital flight with 2 cosmonauts					
14 February; 16:15:01 (UTC)	(United States) Delta II 6920-8		(United States) Cape Canaveral LC-17B		(United States) McDonnell Douglas	
14 February; 16:15:01 (UTC)	(United States) LACE (USA-51)	DoD	Low Earth	Technology demonstration	24 May 2000	Successful
14 February; 16:15:01 (UTC)	(United States) RME (USA-52)	DoD	Low Earth	Technology demonstration	24 May 1992	Successful
14 February; 16:15:01 (UTC)	Maiden flight of Delta II 6920					
15 February; 07:52	(Soviet Union) Proton-K/DM-2		(Soviet Union) Baikonur Site 81/23		(Soviet Union)	
15 February; 07:52	(Soviet Union) Raduga 25		Geosynchronous	Communications	In orbit	Operational
22 February; 23:17	(France) Ariane 4 (44L)		(France) Kourou ELA-2		(France) Arianespace	
22 February; 23:17	(Japan) Superbird B	SCC	Intended: Geosynchronous transfer	Communications	T+ seconds	Launch failure
22 February; 23:17	(Japan) BS 2X		Intended: Geosynchronous transfer	Communications	T+ seconds	Launch failure
22 February; 23:17	Blocked water line caused rocket explosion					
27 February; 20:59	(Soviet Union) Kosmos-3M		(Soviet Union) Plesetsk Site 132/2		(Soviet Union)	
27 February; 20:59	(Soviet Union) Nadezhda 2		Low Earth	Navigation	In orbit	Operational
28 February; 00:55	(Soviet Union) Tsyklon-3		(Soviet Union) Plesetsk Site 32/2		(Soviet Union)	
28 February; 00:55	(Soviet Union) Okean 2		Low Earth	Earth science	In orbit	Operational
28 February; 07:50	(United States) Space Shuttle Atlantis		(United States) Kennedy LC-39A		(United States)	
28 February; 07:50	(United States) STS-36	NASA	Low Earth	Satellite deployment	4 March; 03:08	Successful
28 February; 07:50	(United States) USA-53 (Misty-1)	NRO	Low Earth	Reconnaissance	In orbit	Operational
28 February; 07:50	Crewed orbital flight with 5 astronauts					
28 February; 23:10	(Soviet Union) Soyuz-U2		(Soviet Union) Baikonur Site 1/5		(Soviet Union)	
28 February; 23:10	(Soviet Union) Progress M-3		Low Earth (Mir)	Logistics	28 April; 00:52	Successful
=== March ===
14 March; 11:52	(United States) Commercial Titan III		(United States) Cape Canaveral LC-40		(United States) Martin Marietta	
14 March; 11:52	(United Nations) Intelsat 603	Intelsat	Geosynchronous	Communications	In orbit	Partial launch failure
14 March; 11:52	Due to non-separation of second stage Intelsat 603 was released from its perigee motor into a Low Earth orbit. Space Shuttle Endeavour on mission STS-49 attached a new perigee motor which boosted the satellite to geosynchronous orbit.					
14 March; 15:27	(Soviet Union) Tsyklon-2		(Soviet Union) Baikonur Site 90/20		(Soviet Union)	
14 March; 15:27	(Soviet Union) Kosmos 2060 (US-P)		Low Earth	Naval Reconnaissance	1 September 1991	Successful
20 March; 00:25	(Soviet Union) Kosmos-3M		(Soviet Union) Plesetsk Site 133/3		(Soviet Union)	
20 March; 00:25	(Soviet Union) Kosmos 2061 (Parus)		Low Earth	Navigation	In orbit	Successful
22 March; 07:20	(Soviet Union) Soyuz-U		(Soviet Union) Plesetsk		(Soviet Union)	
22 March; 07:20	(Soviet Union) Kosmos 2062 (Zenit-8)		Low Earth	Reconnaissance	28 April	Successful
26 March; 02:45	(United States) Delta II 6925		(United States) Cape Canaveral LC-17A		(United States) McDonnell Douglas	
26 March; 02:45	(United States) GPS II-7 (USA-54)	US Air Force	Medium Earth	Navigation	In orbit	Spacecraft failure
26 March; 02:45	Signal anomaly on 21 May 1996 made the satellite unusable in the GPS constellation.					
27 March; 16:40	(Soviet Union) Molniya-M/2BL		(Soviet Union) Plesetsk		(Soviet Union)	
27 March; 16:40	(Soviet Union) Kosmos 2063 (Oko)		Molniya	Early warning	In orbit	Operational
=== April ===
3 April; 12:02	(Israel) Shavit		(Israel) Palmachim		(Israel)	
3 April; 12:02	(Israel) Ofeq-2		Low Earth (retrograde)	Reconnaissance	In orbit	Operational
3 April	(Soviet Union) Soyuz-U		(Soviet Union) Plesetsk Site 43		(Soviet Union)	
3 April	(Soviet Union) Yantar-4K2		Intended: Low Earth	Reconnaissance	3 April	Launch failure
5 April; 19:10	(United States) Pegasus		(United States) Balls 8 Edwards		(United States) Orbital Sciences	
5 April; 19:10	(United States) Pegsat	NASA	Low Earth	Space Physics	14 November 1998	Successful
5 April; 19:10	(United States) USA-55 (SECS)	DoD	Low Earth	Communications	In orbit	Operational
5 April; 19:10	Maiden flight of Pegasus					
6 April; 03:13	(Soviet Union) Kosmos-3M		(Soviet Union) Plesetsk Site 133/3		(Soviet Union)	
6 April; 03:13	(Soviet Union) Kosmos 2064 (Strela-1M)		Low Earth	Communications	In orbit	Operational
6 April; 03:13	(Soviet Union) Kosmos 2065 (Strela-1M)		Low Earth	Communications	In orbit	Operational
6 April; 03:13	(Soviet Union) Kosmos 2066 (Strela-1M)		Low Earth	Communications	In orbit	Operational
6 April; 03:13	(Soviet Union) Kosmos 2067 (Strela-1M)		Low Earth	Communications	In orbit	Operational
6 April; 03:13	(Soviet Union) Kosmos 2068 (Strela-1M)		Low Earth	Communications	In orbit	Operational
6 April; 03:13	(Soviet Union) Kosmos 2069 (Strela-1M)		Low Earth	Communications	In orbit	Operational
6 April; 03:13	(Soviet Union) Kosmos 2070 (Strela-1M)		Low Earth	Communications	In orbit	Operational
6 April; 03:13	(Soviet Union) Kosmos 2071 (Strela-1M)		Low Earth	Communications	In orbit	Operational
7 April; 13:30	(China) Long March 3		(China) Xichang LC-1		(China)	
7 April; 13:30	(China) AsiaSat 1	AsiaSat	Geosynchronous	Communications	In orbit	Operational
7 April; 13:30	Originally launched as Westar 6 by Space Shuttle Challenger in February 1984 on mission STS-41-B. Was stranded in an incorrect orbit and was recovered in November 1984 by Space Shuttle Discovery on mission STS-51-A. Westar 6 was refurbished and sold to AsiaSat who renamed it AsiaSat 1.					
11 April; 15:00	(United States) Atlas-E/Altair-3A		(United States) Vandenberg SLC-3W		(United States) Lockheed	
11 April; 15:00	(United States) USA-56 (POGS)	DoD	Low Earth	Technology demonstration	In orbit	Successful
11 April; 15:00	(United States) USA-57 (TEX)	DoD	Low Earth	Technology demonstration	In orbit	Successful
11 April; 15:00	(United States) USA-58 (SCE)	DoD	Low Earth	Technology demonstration	In orbit	Successful
11 April; 17:00	(Soviet Union) Soyuz-U		(Soviet Union) Plesetsk Site 43/3		(Soviet Union)	
11 April; 17:00	(France) / (Soviet Union) Foton 6	CNES	Low Earth	Microgravity research	27 April; 06:15	Successful
13 April; 18:53	(Soviet Union) Soyuz-U		(Soviet Union) Baikonur		(Soviet Union)	
13 April; 18:53	(Soviet Union) Kosmos 2072 (Yantar-4KS1)		Low Earth	Reconnaissance	22 November	Successful
13 April; 22:28	(United States) Delta II 6925-8		(United States) Cape Canaveral LC-17B		(United States) McDonnell Douglas	
13 April; 22:28	(Indonesia) Palapa B2R	Telkom Indonesia	Geosynchronous	Communications	In orbit	Operational
13 April; 22:28	Originally launched in February 1984 as Palapa B2 by Space Shuttle Challenger on mission STS-41-B. Was stranded in an incorrect orbit and was recovered in November 1984 by Space Shuttle Discovery on mission STS-51-A.					
17 April; 08:00	(Soviet Union) Soyuz-U		(Soviet Union) Plesetsk		(Soviet Union)	
17 April; 08:00	(Soviet Union) Kosmos 2073 (Zenit-8)		Low Earth	Reconnaissance	28 April	Successful
20 April; 18:41	(Soviet Union) Kosmos-3M		(Soviet Union) Plesetsk Site 133/3		(Soviet Union)	
20 April; 18:41	(Soviet Union) Kosmos 2074 (Parus)		Low Earth	Navigation	In orbit	Operational
24 April; 12:33	(United States) Space Shuttle Discovery		(United States) Kennedy LC-39B		(United States)	
24 April; 12:33	(United States) STS-31	NASA	Low Earth	HST deployment	29 April; 13:49	Successful
24 April; 12:33	(United States) /Hubble Space Telescope	NASA/ESA	Low Earth	Space Telescope	In orbit	Operational
24 April; 12:33	Crewed orbital flight with 5 astronauts					
25 April; 13:00	(Soviet Union) Kosmos-3M		(Soviet Union) Plesetsk Site 132/2		(Soviet Union)	
25 April; 13:00	(Soviet Union) Kosmos 2075 (Taifun-2)		Low Earth	Target	20 February 1992	Successful
26 April; 01:37	(Soviet Union) Molniya-M/ML		(Soviet Union) Plesetsk		(Soviet Union)	
26 April; 01:37	(Soviet Union) Molniya 1-77		Molniya	Communications	25 February 2005	Successful
28 April; 11:37	(Soviet Union) Molniya-M/2BL		(Soviet Union) Plesetsk		(Soviet Union)	
28 April; 11:37	(Soviet Union) Kosmos 2076 (Oko)		Molniya	Early warning	In orbit	Operational
=== May ===
5 May; 20:44	(Soviet Union) Soyuz-U2		(Soviet Union) Baikonur Site 1/5		(Soviet Union)	
5 May; 20:44	(Soviet Union) Progress 42		Low Earth (Mir)	Logistics	27 May; 12:27	Successful
5 May; 20:44	Final flight of baseline Progress spacecraft					
7 May; 18:39	(Soviet Union) Soyuz-U		(Soviet Union) Plesetsk		(Soviet Union)	
7 May; 18:39	(Soviet Union) Kosmos 2077 (Yantar-4K2)		Low Earth	Reconnaissance	4 July	Successful
9 May; 17:50	(United States) Scout G-1		(United States) Vandenberg SLC-5		(United States)	
9 May; 17:50	(United States) MacSat 1	DARPA	Low Earth	Communications	In orbit	Successful
9 May; 17:50	(United States) MacSat 2	DARPA	Low Earth	Communications	In orbit	Successful
15 May; 09:55	(Soviet Union) Soyuz-U		(Soviet Union) Baikonur		(Soviet Union)	
15 May; 09:55	(Soviet Union) Kosmos 2078 (Yantar-1KFT)		Low Earth	Reconnaissance	28 June	Successful
19 May; 08:32	(Soviet Union) Proton-K/DM-2		(Soviet Union) Baikonur Site 200/40		(Soviet Union)	
19 May; 08:32	(Soviet Union) Kosmos 2079 (GLONASS)		Medium Earth	Navigation	In orbit	Operational
19 May; 08:32	(Soviet Union) Kosmos 2080 (GLONASS)		Medium Earth	Navigation	In orbit	Operational
19 May; 08:32	(Soviet Union) Kosmos 2081 (GLONASS)		Medium Earth	Navigation	In orbit	Operational
22 May; 05:14	(Soviet Union) Zenit-2		(Soviet Union) Baikonur Site 45/2		(Soviet Union)	
22 May; 05:14	(Soviet Union) Kosmos 2082 (Tselina-2)		Low Earth	ELINT	In orbit	Operational
22 May; 05:14	First launch from Site 45/2					
29 May; 07:19	(Soviet Union) Soyuz-U		(Soviet Union) Plesetsk Site 43/4		(Soviet Union)	
29 May; 07:19	(Soviet Union) Resurs-F6		Low Earth	Reconnaissance	14 June	Successful
31 May; 10:33	(Soviet Union) Proton-K		(Soviet Union) Baikonur Site 200/39		(Soviet Union)	
31 May; 10:33	(Soviet Union) Kristall		Low Earth (Mir)	Mir module	23 March 2001; 05:50	Successful
=== June ===
1 June; 21:48	(United States) Delta II 6920-10		(United States) Cape Canaveral LC-17A		(United States) McDonnell Douglas	
1 June; 21:48	(Germany) ROSAT		Low Earth	Astronomy	23 October 2011	Successful
8 June; 05:21	(United States) Titan IVA (405)		(United States) Cape Canaveral LC-41		(United States) Martin Marietta	
8 June; 05:21	(United States) USA-59 (SLDCOM)	US Air Force	Low Earth	Communications	In orbit	Operational
8 June; 05:21	(United States) USA-60 (NOSS-2)	US Navy	Low Earth	Naval Reconnaissance	In orbit	Operational
8 June; 05:21	(United States) USA-61 (NOSS-2)	US Navy	Low Earth	Naval Reconnaissance	In orbit	Operational
8 June; 05:21	(United States) USA-62 (NOSS-2)	US Navy	Low Earth	Naval Reconnaissance	In orbit	Operational
12 June; 05:52	(United States) Delta 4925		(United States) Cape Canaveral LC-17B		(United States) McDonnell Douglas	
12 June; 05:52	(India) INSAT 1D	ISRO	Geosynchronous	Communications	In orbit	Successful
12 June; 05:52	Final flight of Delta 4925					
13 June; 01:07	(Soviet Union) Molniya-M/ML		(Soviet Union) Plesetsk		(Soviet Union)	
13 June; 01:07	(Soviet Union) Molniya 3-47L		Molniya	Communications	26 February 2006	Successful
19 June; 08:45	(Soviet Union) Soyuz-U		(Soviet Union) Plesetsk		(Soviet Union)	
19 June; 08:45	(Soviet Union) Kosmos 2083 (Zenit-8)		Low Earth	Reconnaissance	3 July 1990	Successful
20 June; 23:36	(Soviet Union) Proton-K/DM		(Soviet Union) Baikonur Site 200/40		(Soviet Union)	
20 June; 23:36	(Soviet Union) Gorizont 20		Geosynchronous	Communications	In orbit	Successful
21 June; 20:45	(Soviet Union) Molniya-M/2BL		(Soviet Union) Plesetsk Site 43/3		(Soviet Union)	
21 June; 20:45	(Soviet Union) Kosmos 2084 (Oko)		Intended: Molniya; Achieved: Low Earth	Early warning	In orbit	Partial Failure
21 June; 20:45	Placed in an incorrect orbit and the satellite did not communicate with the ground.					
23 June; 11:19	(United States) Commercial Titan III		(United States) Cape Canaveral LC-40		(United States) Martin Marietta	
23 June; 11:19	(United Nations) Intelsat 604	Intelsat	Geosynchronous	Communications	In orbit	Successful
27 June; 22:30	(Soviet Union) Tsyklon-3		(Soviet Union) Plesetsk Site 32		(Soviet Union)	
27 June; 22:30	(Soviet Union) Meteor-2-19		Low Earth	Earth Sciences	In orbit	Successful
=== July ===
3 July	(Soviet Union) Soyuz-U		(Soviet Union) Plesetsk Site 16/2		(Soviet Union)	
3 July	(Soviet Union) Yantar-4K2		Intended: Low Earth	Reconnaissance	3 July	Launch failure
11 July; 10:00	(Soviet Union) Soyuz-U2		(Soviet Union) Baikonur Site 1/5		(Soviet Union)	
11 July; 10:00	(France) / (Soviet Union) Gamma	CNES	Low Earth	Astronomy	28 February 1992	Successful
16 July; 00:40	(China) Long March 2E		(China) Xichang LC-2		(China)	
16 July; 00:40	(Pakistan) Badr-1	SUPARCO	Low Earth	Communications	8 December	Successful
16 July; 00:40	(United States) HS-601		Low Earth	Boilerplate spacecraft	In orbit	Successful
16 July; 00:40	Maiden flight of Long March 2E					
17 July; 09:29	(Soviet Union) Soyuz-U		(Soviet Union) Plesetsk Site 43/3		(Soviet Union)	
17 July; 09:29	(Soviet Union) Resurs-F7		Low Earth	Reconnaissance	16 August	Successful
18 July; 21:46	(Soviet Union) Proton-K/DM-2		(Soviet Union) Baikonur Site 200/39		(Soviet Union)	
18 July; 21:46	(Soviet Union) Kosmos 2085 (Geizer 17L)		Geosynchronous	Communications	In orbit	Operational
20 July; 08:40	(Soviet Union) Soyuz-U		(Soviet Union) Plesetsk		(Soviet Union)	
20 July; 08:40	(Soviet Union) Kosmos 2086 (Zenit-8)		Low Earth	Reconnaissance	3 August	Successful
24 July; 22:25	(France) Ariane 4 (44L)		(France) Kourou ELA-2		(France) Arianespace	
24 July; 22:25	(France) TDF-2	Telediffusion	Geosynchronous	Communications	In orbit	Successful
24 July; 22:25	(Germany) DFS-2		Geosynchronous	Communications	In orbit	Successful
25 July; 18:13	(Soviet Union) Molniya-M/2BL		(Soviet Union) Plesetsk		(Soviet Union)	
25 July; 18:13	(Soviet Union) Kosmos 2087 (Oko)		Molniya	Early warning	In orbit	Operational
25 July; 19:21	(United States) Atlas I		(United States) Cape Canaveral LC-36B		(United States)	
25 July; 19:21	(United States) CRRES	US Air Force	Geosynchronous transfer	Space Physics	In orbit	Successful
25 July; 19:21	Maiden flight of Atlas I Contact with spacecraft lost on 12 October 1991 due to onboard battery failure.					
30 July; 00:06	(Soviet Union) Tsyklon-3		(Soviet Union) Plesetsk Site 32/1		(Soviet Union)	
30 July; 00:06	(Soviet Union) Kosmos 2088 (Geo-IK)		Low Earth	Earth Science	In orbit	Successful
=== August ===
1 August; 09:32	(Soviet Union) Soyuz-U2		(Soviet Union) Baikonur Site 1/5		(Soviet Union)	
1 August; 09:32	(Soviet Union) Soyuz TM-10		Low Earth (Mir)	Mir EO-7	10 December; 06:08	Successful
1 August; 09:32	Crewed orbital flight with 2 cosmonauts					
2 August; 05:39	(United States) Delta II 6925		(United States) Cape Canaveral LC-17A		(United States) McDonnell Douglas	
2 August; 05:39	(United States) GPS II-8 (USA-63)	US Air Force	Medium Earth	Navigation	In orbit	Operational
3 August; 19:45	(Soviet Union) Soyuz-U		(Soviet Union) Plesetsk		(Soviet Union)	
3 August; 19:45	(Soviet Union) Kosmos 2089 (Yantar-4K2)		Low Earth	Reconnaissance	1 October	Successful
8 August; 04:15	(Soviet Union) Tsyklon-3		(Soviet Union) Plesetsk Site 32		(Soviet Union)	
8 August; 04:15	(Soviet Union) Kosmos 2090 (Strela-3)		Low Earth	Communications	In orbit	Operational
8 August; 04:15	(Soviet Union) Kosmos 2091 (Strela-3)		Low Earth	Communications	In orbit	Operational
8 August; 04:15	(Soviet Union) Kosmos 2092 (Strela-3)		Low Earth	Communications	In orbit	Operational
8 August; 04:15	(Soviet Union) Kosmos 2093 (Strela-3)		Low Earth	Communications	In orbit	Operational
8 August; 04:15	(Soviet Union) Kosmos 2094 (Strela-3)		Low Earth	Communications	In orbit	Operational
8 August; 04:15	(Soviet Union) Kosmos 2095 (Strela-3)		Low Earth	Communications	In orbit	Operational
9 August; 20:18	(Soviet Union) Proton-K/DM-2		(Soviet Union) Baikonur Site 200/39		(Soviet Union)	
9 August; 20:18	(Soviet Union) Ekran-M		Intended: Geosynchronous	Communications	9 August	Launch failure
10 August; 20:18	(Soviet Union) Molniya-M/ML		(Soviet Union) Plesetsk		(Soviet Union)	
10 August; 20:18	(Soviet Union) Molniya 1-78		Molniya	Communications	6 July 2007	Successful
15 August; 04:00	(Soviet Union) Soyuz-U2		(Soviet Union) Baikonur Site 1/5		(Soviet Union)	
15 August; 04:00	(Soviet Union) Progress M-4		Low Earth (Mir)	Logistics	20 September; 11:42	Successful
16 August; 09:54	(Soviet Union) Soyuz-U		(Soviet Union) Plesetsk Site 43/4		(Soviet Union)	
16 August; 09:54	(Soviet Union) Resurs-F8		Low Earth	Reconnaissance	1 September	Successful
18 August; 00:42	(United States) Delta II 6925		(United States) Cape Canaveral LC-17B		(United States) McDonnell Douglas	
18 August; 00:42	(United Kingdom) Marco Polo 2		Geosynchronous	Communications	In orbit	Successful
23 August; 16:17	(Soviet Union) Tsyklon-2		(Soviet Union) Baikonur Site 90/20		(Soviet Union)	
23 August; 16:17	(Soviet Union) Kosmos 2096 (US-P)		Low Earth	Naval Reconnaissance	30 August 1992	Successful
28 August; 07:49	(Soviet Union) Molniya-M/2BL		(Soviet Union) Plesetsk		(Soviet Union)	
28 August; 07:49	(Soviet Union) Kosmos 2097 (Oko)		Molniya	Early warning	In orbit	Operational
28 August; 09:05	(Japan) H-1		(Japan) Tanegashima LA-N		(Japan) Mitsubishi	
28 August; 09:05	(Japan) BS 3A		Geosynchronous	Communications	In orbit	Successful
28 August; 15:45	(Soviet Union) Kosmos-3M		(Soviet Union) Plesetsk Site 133/3		(Soviet Union)	
28 August; 15:45	(Soviet Union) Kosmos 2098 (Taifun-1)		Low Earth	Earth Science	In orbit	Successful
30 August; 22:46	(France) Ariane 4 (44LP)		(France) Kourou ELA-2		(France) Arianespace	
30 August; 22:46	(United Kingdom) Skynet 4C	MoD	Geosynchronous	Communications	In orbit	Operational
30 August; 22:46	(France) Eutelsat 2F1	Eutelsat	Geosynchronous	Communications	In orbit	Successful
31 August; 08:00	(Soviet Union) Soyuz-U		(Soviet Union) Plesetsk		(Soviet Union)	
31 August; 08:00	(Soviet Union) Kosmos 2099 (Zenit-8)		Low Earth	Reconnaissance	14 September	Successful
=== September ===
3 September; 00:53	(China) Long March 4A		(China) Taiyuan LC-1		(China)	
3 September; 00:53	(China) Feng Yun 1B		Sun-synchronous	Weather satellite	In orbit	Successful
3 September; 00:53	(China) Qi Qiu Weixing 1		Sun-synchronous	Atmospheric research	11 March 1991	Successful
3 September; 00:53	(China) Qi Qiu Weixing 2		Sun-synchronous	Atmospheric research	24 July 1991	Successful
3 September; 00:53	Final flight of Long March 4A					
7 September; 11:59	(Soviet Union) Soyuz-U		(Soviet Union) Plesetsk Site 16/2		(Soviet Union)	
7 September; 11:59	(Soviet Union) Resurs-F9		Low Earth	Reconnaissance	21 September	Successful
14 September; 05:59	(Soviet Union) Kosmos-3M		(Soviet Union) Plesetsk Site 133/3		(Soviet Union)	
14 September; 05:59	(Soviet Union) Kosmos 2100 (Parus)		Low Earth	Navigation	In orbit	Operational
20 September; 20:16	(Soviet Union) Molniya-M/ML		(Soviet Union) Plesetsk		(Soviet Union)	
20 September; 20:16	(Soviet Union) Molniya 3-54L		Molniya	Communications	In orbit	Operational
27 September; 10:37	(Soviet Union) Soyuz-U2		(Soviet Union) Baikonur Site 1/5		(Soviet Union)	
27 September; 10:37	(Soviet Union) Progress M-5		Low Earth (Mir)	Logistics	28 November; 11:04	Successful
28 September; 07:30	(Soviet Union) Tsyklon-3		(Soviet Union) Plesetsk Site 32		(Soviet Union)	
28 September; 07:30	(Soviet Union) Meteor-2-20		Low Earth	Earth Science	In orbit	Successful
=== October ===
1 October; 11:00	(Soviet Union) Soyuz-U2		(Soviet Union) Baikonur Site 1/5		(Soviet Union)	
1 October; 11:00	(Soviet Union) Kosmos 2101 (Orlets-1)		Low Earth	Reconnaissance	30 November	Successful
1 October; 21:56	(United States) Delta II 6925		(United States) Cape Canaveral LC-17A		(United States) McDonnell Douglas	
1 October; 21:56	(United States) GPS II-9 (USA-64)	US Air Force	Medium Earth	Navigation	In orbit	Successful
4 October	(Soviet Union) Zenit-2		(Soviet Union) Baikonur Site 45/2		(Soviet Union)	
4 October	(Soviet Union) Tselina-2		Intended: Low Earth	ELINT	T+5 seconds	Launch failure
4 October	First stage engine failure five seconds after launch. Subsequent explosion completely destroyed the launch pad, which was not rebuilt.					
5 October; 06:14	(China) Long March 2C		(China) Jiuquan LA-2B		(China)	
5 October; 06:14	(China) FSW-1-3		Low Earth	Reconnaissance	13 October; 03:59	Successful
6 October; 11:47	(United States) Space Shuttle Discovery		(United States) Kennedy LC-39B		(United States)	
6 October; 11:47	(United States) STS-41	NASA	Low Earth	Satellite deployment	10 October	Successful
6 October; 11:47	/ (United States) Ulysses	ESA/NASA	Heliocentric	Solar probe	In orbit	Successful
6 October; 11:47	Crewed orbital flight with 5 astronauts					
12 October; 22:58	Ariane 4 (44L)		(France) Kourou ELA-2		(France) Arianespace	
12 October; 22:58	(United States) SBS 6	SBS	Geosynchronous	Communications	In orbit	Successful
12 October; 22:58	(United States) Galaxy 6	PanAmSat	Geosynchronous	Communications	In orbit	Successful
16 October; 19:00	(Soviet Union) Soyuz-U		(Soviet Union) Plesetsk		(Soviet Union)	
16 October; 19:00	(Soviet Union) Kosmos 2102 (Yantar-4K2)		Low Earth	Reconnaissance	12 December	Successful
30 October; 23:16	(United States) Delta II 6925		(United States) Cape Canaveral LC-17B		(United States) McDonnell Douglas	
30 October; 23:16	(United Kingdom) Inmarsat 2F1	Inmarsat	Geosynchronous	Communications	In orbit	Operational
=== November ===
3 November; 14:40	(Soviet Union) Proton-K/DM-2		(Soviet Union) Baikonur Site 81/23		(Soviet Union)	
3 November; 14:40	(Soviet Union) Gorizont 21		Geosynchronous	Communications	In orbit	Successful
13 November; 00:37	(United States) Titan IVA (402)/IUS		(United States) Cape Canaveral LC-41		(United States) Martin Marietta	
13 November; 00:37	(United States) USA-65 (DSP-15)	US Air Force	Geosynchronous	Early warning	In orbit	Operational
14 November; 06:33	(Soviet Union) Tsyklon-2		(Soviet Union) Baikonur Site 90/20		(Soviet Union)	
14 November; 06:33	(Soviet Union) Kosmos 2103 (US-P)		Low Earth	Naval Reconnaissance	3 April 1991	Successful
15 November; 23:48	(United States) Space Shuttle Atlantis		(United States) Kennedy LC-39A		(United States)	
15 November; 23:48	(United States) STS-38	NASA	Low Earth	Satellite deployment	20 November; 21:42	Successful
15 November; 23:48	(United States) USA-67 (SDS-2)	NRO	Geosynchronous	Communications	In orbit	Operational
15 November; 23:48	(United States) Prowler	NRO	Geosynchronous	Satellite inspection Technology	In orbit	Successful
15 November; 23:48	Crewed orbital flight with 5 astronauts					
16 November; 16:30	(Soviet Union) Soyuz-U		(Soviet Union) Plesetsk		(Soviet Union)	
16 November; 16:30	(Soviet Union) Kosmos 2104 (Zenit-8)		Low Earth	Reconnaissance	4 December	Successful
20 November; 02:33	(Soviet Union) Molniya-M/2BL		(Soviet Union) Plesetsk		(Soviet Union)	
20 November; 02:33	(Soviet Union) Kosmos 2105 (Oko)		Molniya	Early warning	16 January 2008	Successful
20 November; 23:11	(France) Ariane 4 (42P)		(France) Kourou ELA-2		(France) Arianespace	
20 November; 23:11	(United States) Satcom C1	GE Americom	Geosynchronous	Communications	In orbit	Successful
20 November; 23:11	(United States) GStar 4	Spacenet	Geosynchronous	Communications	In orbit	Successful
20 November; 23:11	Maiden flight of Ariane 4 (42P)					
23 November; 03:51	(Soviet Union) Molniya-M/ML		(Soviet Union) Plesetsk		(Soviet Union)	
23 November; 03:51	(Soviet Union) Molniya 1-79		Molniya	Communications	30 August 2005	Successful
23 November; 13:22	(Soviet Union) Proton-K/DM-2		(Soviet Union) Baikonur Site 200/39		(Soviet Union)	
23 November; 13:22	(Soviet Union) Gorizont 22		Geosynchronous	Communications	In orbit	Operational
26 November; 21:39	(United States) Delta II 7925		(United States) Cape Canaveral LC-17A		(United States) McDonnell Douglas	
26 November; 21:39	(United States) GPS IIA-1 (USA-66)	US Air Force	Medium Earth	Navigation	In orbit	Successful
26 November; 21:39	Maiden flight of Delta II 7925					
28 November; 16:33	(Soviet Union) Tsyklon-3		(Soviet Union) Plesetsk Site 32		(Soviet Union)	
28 November; 16:33	(Soviet Union) Kosmos 2106 (Tselina-D)		Low Earth	ELINT	7 April 2000	Successful
=== December ===
1 December; 15:57	(United States) Atlas-E/Star-37		(United States) Vandenberg SLC-3W		(United States) Lockheed	
1 December; 15:57	(United States) USA-68 (DMSP-5D2 F10)	US Air Force	Sun-synchronous	Weather satellite	In orbit	Successful
2 December; 06:49	(United States) Space Shuttle Columbia		(United States) Kennedy LC-39B		(United States)	
2 December; 06:49	(United States) STS-35	NASA	Low Earth	Astronomy	10 December; 23:54	Successful
2 December; 06:49	Crewed orbital flight with 7 astronauts					
2 December; 08:13	(Soviet Union) Soyuz-U2		(Soviet Union) Baikonur Site 1/5		(Soviet Union)	
2 December; 08:13	(Soviet Union) Soyuz TM-11		Low Earth (Mir)	Mir EO-8	26 May 1991; 10:04	Successful
2 December; 08:13	Crewed orbital flight with 3 cosmonauts including the first Japanese space traveler.					
4 December; 00:48	(Soviet Union) Tsyklon-2		(Soviet Union) Baikonur Site 90/20		(Soviet Union)	
4 December; 00:48	(Soviet Union) Kosmos 2107 (US-P)		Low Earth	Naval Reconnaissance	6 April 1992	Successful
4 December; 18:30	(Soviet Union) Soyuz-U		(Soviet Union) Plesetsk		(Soviet Union)	
4 December; 18:30	(Soviet Union) Kosmos 2108 (Yantar-4K2)		Low Earth	Reconnaissance	28 January 1991	Successful
8 December; 02:43	(Soviet Union) Proton-K/DM-2		(Soviet Union) Baikonur Site 81/23		(Soviet Union)	
8 December; 02:43	(Soviet Union) Kosmos 2109 (GLONASS)		Medium Earth	Navigation	In orbit	Operational
8 December; 02:43	(Soviet Union) Kosmos 2110 (GLONASS)		Medium Earth	Navigation	In orbit	Operational
8 December; 02:43	(Soviet Union) Kosmos 2111 (GLONASS)		Medium Earth	Navigation	In orbit	Operational
10 December; 07:54	(Soviet Union) Kosmos-3M		(Soviet Union) Plesetsk Site 133/3		(Soviet Union)	
10 December; 07:54	(Soviet Union) Kosmos 2112 (Strela-2M)		Low Earth	Communications	In orbit	Successful
20 December; 11:35	(Soviet Union) Proton-K/DM-2		(Soviet Union) Baikonur Site 81/23		(Soviet Union)	
20 December; 11:35	(Soviet Union) Raduga 26		Geosynchronous	Communications	In orbit	Operational
21 December; 06:20	(Soviet Union) Soyuz-U		(Soviet Union) Baikonur		(Soviet Union)	
21 December; 06:20	(Soviet Union) Kosmos 2113 (Yantar-4KS1)		Low Earth	Reconnaissance	11 June 1991	Successful
22 December; 07:28	(Soviet Union) Tsyklon-3		(Soviet Union) Plesetsk Site 32		(Soviet Union)	
22 December; 07:28	(Soviet Union) Kosmos 2114 (Strela-3)		Low Earth	Communications	In orbit	Operational
22 December; 07:28	(Soviet Union) Kosmos 2115 (Strela-3)		Low Earth	Communications	In orbit	Operational
22 December; 07:28	(Soviet Union) Kosmos 2116 (Strela-3)		Low Earth	Communications	In orbit	Operational
22 December; 07:28	(Soviet Union) Kosmos 2117 (Strela-3)		Low Earth	Communications	In orbit	Operational
22 December; 07:28	(Soviet Union) Kosmos 2118 (Strela-3)		Low Earth	Communications	In orbit	Operational
22 December; 07:28	(Soviet Union) Kosmos 2119 (Strela-3)		Low Earth	Communications	In orbit	Operational
26 December; 11:10	(Soviet Union) Soyuz-U		(Soviet Union) Plesetsk		(Soviet Union)	
26 December; 11:10	(Soviet Union) Kosmos 2120 (Zenit-8)		Low Earth	Reconnaissance	17 January 1991	Successful
27 December; 11:08	(Soviet Union) Proton-K/DM-2		(Soviet Union) Baikonur Site 200/39		(Soviet Union)	
27 December; 11:08	(Soviet Union) Raduga-1-2		Geosynchronous	Communications	In orbit	Operational

- ← Jan
- Feb
- Mar
- Apr
- May
- Jun
- Jul
- Aug
- Sep
- Oct
- Nov
- Dec →

== Deep-space rendezvous ==
Date (GMT)	Spacecraft	Event	Remarks
10 February	Galileo	Flyby of Venus	Gravity assist; Closest approach: 16,000 kilometres (9,900 mi)
19 March	Hiten	Flyby of the Moon	
19 March	Hagoromo	Selenocentric orbit injection	
10 August	Magellan	Cytherean orbit injection	
8 December	Galileo	1st flyby of the Earth	Gravity assist; Closest approach: 960 kilometres (600 mi)

== EVAs ==
Start date/time	Duration	End time	Spacecraft	Crew	Remarks
8 January; 20:23	2 hours 56 minutes	23:19	Mir EO-5	(Soviet Union) Alexander Viktorenko (Soviet Union) Aleksandr Serebrov	Installed new star tracker sensors launched in the Kvant-2 module onto Kvant-1.
11 January; 18:01	2 hours 54 minutes	20:55	Mir EO-5	(Soviet Union) Alexander Viktorenko (Soviet Union) Aleksandr Serebrov	Closed out experimental racks, either retrieving for return to Earth, or discarding into space. Modified the docking node for the arrival of the Kristall module.
26 January; 12:09	3 hours 2 minutes	15:11	Mir EO-5; Kvant-2	(Soviet Union) Alexander Viktorenko (Soviet Union) Aleksandr Serebrov	Tested the new Orlan-DMA spacesuit. This spacewalk team was the first use of the EVA airlock hatch on the Kvant-2 module. During the spacewalk a mooring post was attached outside the airlock, and a Kurs antenna was removed to enable future EVAs.
1 February; 08:15	4 hours 59 minutes	13:14	Mir EO-5; Kvant-2	(Soviet Union) Alexander Viktorenko (Soviet Union) Aleksandr Serebrov	Tested the SPK "flying armchair", analogous to NASA's MMU. The SPK did not fly free, but remained tethered to Kvant-2 during the tests.
5 February; 06:08	3 hours 45 minutes	09:53	Mir EO-5; Kvant-2	(Soviet Union) Alexander Viktorenko (Soviet Union) Aleksandr Serebrov	Conducted more tests of the SPK. Viktorenko reached as far as 45 metres (148 ft) from Mir.
17 July; 13:06	7 hours 15 minutes	20:22	Mir EO-6; Kvant-2	(Soviet Union) Anatoly Solovyev (Soviet Union) Aleksandr Balandin	At the start of their EVA to repair torn insulation on the Soyuz TM-9, Solovyev and Balandin damaged the hatch on Kvant-2 by opening it before the airlock was completely depressurized. The spacewalking team repaired the insulation on Soyuz, but time constraints required returning to Kvant-2 before they collected their tools and ladders. Unable to securely close the damaged hatch, they used the center section of Kvant-2 as a back-up airlock.
26 July; 11:15	3 hours 31 minutes	14:46	Mir EO-6; Kvant-2	(Soviet Union) Anatoly Solovyev (Soviet Union) Aleksandr Balandin	Transmitted images of the damaged hatch to TsUP, recovered the ladders and tools left outside earlier and removed debris lodged in the hinge of the airlock hatch, allowing the hatch to close and seal for repressurization.
29 October; 21:45	2 hours 45 minutes	30 October; 00:30	Mir EO-7; Kvant-2	(Soviet Union) Gennadi Manakov (Soviet Union) Gennady Strekalov	After removing insulation around the damaged Kvant-2 hatch, they found the hatch to be more heavily damaged than previously understood. Although unable to completely repair the hatch, they added hardware to the hatch.

== See also ==
- Bergin, Chris. "NASASpaceFlight.com".
- Clark, Stephen. "Spaceflight Now".
- Kelso, T.S. "Satellite Catalog (SATCAT)". CelesTrak.
- Krebs, Gunter. "Chronology of Space Launches".
- Kyle, Ed. "Space Launch Report". Archived from the original on 5 October 2009.
- McDowell, Jonathan. "GCAT Orbital Launch Log".
- Pietrobon, Steven. "Steven Pietrobon's Space Archive".
- Wade, Mark. "Encyclopedia Astronautica".
- Webb, Brian. "Southwest Space Archive".
- Zak, Anatoly. "Russian Space Web".
- "ISS Calendar". Spaceflight 101.
- "NSSDCA Master Catalog". NASA Space Science Data Coordinated Archive. NASA Goddard Space Flight Center.
- "Хроника освоения космоса" [Chronicle of space exploration]. CosmoWorld (in Russian).
- "Rocket Launch Manifest". Next Spaceflight.
- "Space Launch Plans". Novosti Kosmonavtiki.
- "Space Satellite Tracking". N2YO.
Generic references:
