= Kosmos 2084 =

Russian early warning satellite

- Mission type: Early warning
- COSPAR ID: 1990-055A
- SATCAT no.: 20663
- Mission duration: 4 years

Spacecraft properties
- Spacecraft type: US-K
- Launch mass: 1,900 kilograms (4,200 lb)

Start of mission
- Launch date: 21 June 1990, 20:45 UTC
- Rocket: Molniya-M/2BL
- Launch site: Plesetsk Cosmodrome

Orbital parameters
- Reference system: Geocentric
- Regime: Low Earth Orbit
- Perigee altitude: 582 kilometres (362 mi)
- Apogee altitude: 759 kilometres (472 mi)
- Inclination: 62.8 degrees
- Period: 98.15 minutes

Kosmos 2084 (Russian: Космос 2084 meaning Cosmos 2084) is a Russian US-K missile early warning satellite which was launched in 1990 as part of the Russian Space Forces' Oko programme. The satellite was designed to identify missile launches using optical telescopes and infrared sensors.

Kosmos 2084 was launched from Site 43/3 at Plesetsk Cosmodrome in Russia. A Molniya-M carrier rocket with a 2BL upper stage was used to perform the launch, which took place at 20:45 UTC on 21 June 1990. The launch failed to place the satellite into a molniya orbit as the Blok 2BL failed to ignite leaving the satellite in low Earth orbit.

It subsequently received its Kosmos designation, and the international designator 1990-055A. The United States Space Command assigned it the Satellite Catalog Number 20663.

== See also ==
- List of Kosmos satellites (2001–2250)
- List of R-7 launches (1990–1994)
- 1990 in spaceflight
- List of Oko satellites
