= Kosmos 2155 =

Soviet military early warning satellite

- Mission type: Early warning
- Operator: VKS
- COSPAR ID: 1991-064A
- SATCAT no.: 21702
- Mission duration: 9 months

Spacecraft properties
- Spacecraft type: US-KS (74Kh6)
- Manufacturer: Lavochkin
- Launch mass: 2,400 kilograms (5,300 lb)

Start of mission
- Launch date: 13 September 1991, 17:51:00 UTC
- Rocket: Proton-K/DM-2
- Launch site: Baikonur 81/23

End of mission
- Deactivated: 16 June 1992

Orbital parameters
- Reference system: Geocentric
- Regime: Geostationary

Instruments
- Optical telescope with 50 centimetres (20 in) aperture Infrared sensor/s Smaller telescopes

Kosmos 2155 (Russian: Космос 2155 meaning Cosmos 2155) is a Russian US-KS missile early warning satellite which was launched in 1991 as part of the Russian Space Forces' Oko programme. The satellite is designed to identify missile launches using optical telescopes and infrared sensors.

Kosmos 2155 was launched from Site 81/23 at Baikonur Cosmodrome in Kazakhstan. A Proton-K carrier rocket with a DM-2 upper stage was used to perform the launch, which took place at 17:51 UTC on 13 September 1991. The launch successfully placed the satellite into geostationary orbit. It subsequently received its Kosmos designation, and the international designator 1991-064A. The United States Space Command assigned it the Satellite Catalog Number 21702.

It was operational for about 9 months.

== See also ==
- List of Kosmos satellites (2001–2250)
