= Progress M-3 =

Progress resupply mission to Mir

- Mission type: Mir resupply
- COSPAR ID: 1990-020A
- SATCAT no.: 20513

Spacecraft properties
- Spacecraft type: Progress-M 11F615A55
- Manufacturer: NPO Energia
- Launch mass: 7,250 kilograms (15,980 lb)

Start of mission
- Launch date: 28 February 1990, 23:10:57 UTC
- Rocket: Soyuz-U2
- Launch site: Baikonur Site 1/5

End of mission
- Disposal: Deorbited
- Decay date: 28 April 1990, 00:52 UTC

Orbital parameters
- Reference system: Geocentric
- Regime: Low Earth
- Perigee altitude: 378 kilometres (235 mi)
- Apogee altitude: 400 kilometres (250 mi)
- Inclination: 51.6 degrees

Docking with Mir
- Docking port: Kvant-1 Aft
- Docking date: 3 March 1990, 01:04:32 UTC
- Undocking date: 27 April 1990, 20:24:43 UTC
- Time docked: 56 days

Progress M-3 (Russian: Прогресс М-3) was a Soviet uncrewed cargo spacecraft which was launched in 1990 to resupply the Mir space station. The twentieth of sixty four Progress flights to visit Mir, it was a Progress-M 11F615A55 spacecraft, and had the serial number 203. It carried supplies including food, water and oxygen for the EO-6 crew aboard Mir, as well as equipment for conducting scientific research, and fuel for adjusting the station's orbit and performing manoeuvres.

Progress M-3 was launched at 23:10:57 GMT on 28 February 1990, atop a Soyuz-U2 carrier rocket flying from Site 1/5 at the Baikonur Cosmodrome. It docked with the aft port of the Kvant-1 module at 01:04:32 GMT on 3 March. During the 56 days for which it was docked with Mir, the station was in an orbit of around 378 by 400 kilometres (204 by 216 nmi), with 51.6 degrees of inclination.

Progress M-3 undocked at 20:24:43 GMT on 27 April to make way for Progress 42. It was deorbited at 00:00:00 GMT the next day. It burned up in the atmosphere over the Pacific Ocean, with any remaining debris landing in the ocean at around 00:52 GMT.

== See also ==
- 1990 in spaceflight
- List of Progress flights
- List of uncrewed spaceflights to Mir
