= Kosmos 2105 =

Soviet military early warning satellite

- Mission type: Early warning
- COSPAR ID: 1990-099A
- SATCAT no.: 20941
- Mission duration: 4 years

Spacecraft properties
- Spacecraft type: US-K
- Launch mass: 1,900 kilograms (4,200 lb)

Start of mission
- Launch date: 20 November 1990, 02:33 UTC
- Rocket: Molniya-M/2BL
- Launch site: Plesetsk Cosmodrome

End of mission
- Decay date: 21 January 2008

Orbital parameters
- Reference system: Geocentric
- Regime: Molniya
- Perigee altitude: 594 kilometres (369 mi)
- Apogee altitude: 39,751 kilometres (24,700 mi)
- Inclination: 63.2 degrees
- Period: 717.60 minutes

Kosmos 2105 (Russian: Космос 2105 meaning Cosmos 2105) is a Russian US-K missile early warning satellite which was launched in 1990 as part of the Russian Space Forces' Oko programme. The satellite is designed to identify missile launches using optical telescopes and infrared sensors.

Kosmos 2105 was launched from Site 16/2 at Plesetsk Cosmodrome in Russia. A Molniya-M carrier rocket with a 2BL upper stage was used to perform the launch, which took place at 02:33 UTC on 20 November 1990. The launch successfully placed the satellite into a molniya orbit. It subsequently received its Kosmos designation, and the international designator 1990-099A. The United States Space Command assigned it the Satellite Catalog Number 20941.

It re-entered the Earth's atmosphere on 21 January 2008.

== See also ==
- List of Kosmos satellites (2001–2250)
- List of R-7 launches (1990–1994)
- 1990 in spaceflight
- List of Oko satellites
