= Kosmos 2063 =

Soviet military early warning satellite

- Mission type: Early warning
- COSPAR ID: 1990-026A
- SATCAT no.: 20536
- Mission duration: 4 years

Spacecraft properties
- Spacecraft type: US-K
- Launch mass: 1,900 kilograms (4,200 lb)

Start of mission
- Launch date: 27 March 1990, 16:40 UTC
- Rocket: Molniya-M/2BL
- Launch site: Plesetsk Cosmodrome

Orbital parameters
- Reference system: Geocentric
- Regime: Molniya
- Perigee altitude: 626 kilometres (389 mi)
- Apogee altitude: 39,729 kilometres (24,686 mi)
- Inclination: 62.9 degrees
- Period: 717.80 minutes

Kosmos 2063 (Russian: Космос 2063 meaning Cosmos 2063) is a Russian US-K missile early warning satellite which was launched in 1990 as part of the Russian Space Forces' Oko programme. The satellite is designed to identify missile launches using optical telescopes and infrared sensors.

Kosmos 2063 was launched from Site 43/3 at Plesetsk Cosmodrome in Russia. A Molniya-M carrier rocket with a 2BL upper stage was used to perform the launch, which took place at 16:40 UTC on 27 March 1990. The launch successfully placed the satellite into a molniya orbit. It subsequently received its Kosmos designation, and the international designator 1990-026A. The United States Space Command assigned it the Satellite Catalog Number 20536.

== See also ==
- List of Kosmos satellites (2001–2250)
- List of R-7 launches (1990–1994)
- 1990 in spaceflight
- List of Oko satellites
