= Kosmos 2241 =

Russian military early warning satellite

- Mission type: Early warning
- COSPAR ID: 1993-022A
- SATCAT no.: 22594
- Mission duration: 4 years

Spacecraft properties
- Spacecraft type: US-K
- Launch mass: 1,900 kilograms (4,200 lb)

Start of mission
- Launch date: 6 April 1993, 19:07 UTC
- Rocket: Molniya-M/2BL
- Launch site: Plesetsk Cosmodrome

End of mission
- Decay date: 8 March 2022

Orbital parameters
- Reference system: Geocentric
- Regime: Molniya
- Perigee altitude: 663 kilometres (412 mi)
- Apogee altitude: 39,690 kilometres (24,660 mi)
- Inclination: 62.9 degrees
- Period: 717.76 minutes

Kosmos 2241 (Russian: Космос 2241 meaning Cosmos 2241) was a Russian US-K missile early warning satellite launched in 1993 as part of the Russian Space Forces' Oko programme. The satellite was designed to detect missile launches using optical telescopes and infrared sensors.

Kosmos 2241 was launched from Site 43/4 at Plesetsk Cosmodrome in Russia. A Molniya-M carrier rocket with a 2BL upper stage was used for the launch, which took place at 19:07 UTC on 6 April 1993. The launch successfully placed the satellite into a molniya orbit. It subsequently received its Kosmos designation, and the international designator 1993-051A. The United States Space Command assigned it the Satellite Catalog Number 22594.

On 8 March 2022, Kosmos 2241 decayed from orbit and reentered the atmosphere.

== See also ==
- List of Kosmos satellites (2001–2250)
- List of R-7 launches (1990–1994)
- 1993 in spaceflight
- List of Oko satellites
