= Kosmos 2196 =

Russian military early warning satellite

- Mission type: Early warning
- COSPAR ID: 1992-040A
- SATCAT no.: 22017
- Mission duration: 4 years

Spacecraft properties
- Spacecraft type: US-K
- Launch mass: 1,900 kilograms (4,200 lb)

Start of mission
- Launch date: 8 July 1992, 09:53 UTC
- Rocket: Molniya-M/2BL
- Launch site: Plesetsk Cosmodrome

Orbital parameters
- Reference system: Geocentric
- Regime: Molniya
- Perigee altitude: 615 kilometres (382 mi)
- Apogee altitude: 39,765 kilometres (24,709 mi)
- Inclination: 63.0 degrees
- Period: 718.31 minutes

Kosmos 2196 (Russian: Космос 2196 meaning Cosmos 2196) is a Russian US-K missile early warning satellite which was launched in 1992 as part of the Russian Space Forces' Oko programme. The satellite is designed to identify missile launches using optical telescopes and infrared sensors.

Kosmos 2196 was launched from Site 43/3 at Plesetsk Cosmodrome in Russia. A Molniya-M carrier rocket with a 2BL upper stage was used to perform the launch, which took place at 09:53 UTC on 8 July 1992. The launch successfully placed the satellite into a molniya orbit. It subsequently received its Kosmos designation, and the international designator 1992-040A. The United States Space Command assigned it the Satellite Catalog Number 22189.

== See also ==
- List of Kosmos satellites (2001–2250)
- List of R-7 launches (1990–1994)
- 1992 in spaceflight
- List of Oko satellites
