= Kosmos 2222 =

Russian military early warning satellite

- Mission type: Early warning
- COSPAR ID: 1992-081A
- SATCAT no.: 22238
- Mission duration: 4 years

Spacecraft properties
- Spacecraft type: US-K
- Launch mass: 1,900 kilograms (4,200 lb)

Start of mission
- Launch date: 25 November 1992, 12:18 UTC
- Rocket: Molniya-M/2BL
- Launch site: Plesetsk Cosmodrome

End of mission
- Decay date: 3 May 2023, 03:58 UTC

Orbital parameters
- Reference system: Geocentric
- Regime: Molniya
- Perigee altitude: 639 kilometres (397 mi)
- Apogee altitude: 39,724 kilometres (24,683 mi)
- Inclination: 62.8 degrees
- Period: 717.96 minutes

Kosmos 2222 (Russian: Космос 2222 meaning Cosmos 2222) is a Russian US-K missile early warning satellite which was launched in 1992 as part of the Russian Space Forces' Oko programme. The satellite is designed to identify missile launches using optical telescopes and infrared sensors.

Kosmos 2222 was launched from Site 43/3 at Plesetsk Cosmodrome in Russia. A Molniya-M carrier rocket with a 2BL upper stage was used to perform the launch, which took place at 12:18 UTC on 25 November 1992. The launch successfully placed the satellite into a molniya orbit. It subsequently received its Kosmos designation, and the international designator 1992-081A. The United States Space Command assigned it the Satellite Catalog Number 22238.

The satellite became inactive in 1995, and reentered the Earth's atmosphere on 3 May 2023 at 03:58 UTC.

== See also ==
- List of Kosmos satellites (2001–2250)
- List of R-7 launches (1990–1994)
- 1992 in spaceflight
- List of Oko satellites
