= Kosmos 2176 =

1992 Russian missile detection satellite

- Mission type: Early warning
- COSPAR ID: 1992-003A
- SATCAT no.: 21847
- Mission duration: 4 years

Spacecraft properties
- Spacecraft type: US-K
- Launch mass: 1,900 kilograms (4,200 lb)

Start of mission
- Launch date: 24 January 1992, 01:18 UTC
- Rocket: Molniya-M/2BL
- Launch site: Plesetsk Cosmodrome

End of mission
- Decay date: 17 January 2012

Orbital parameters
- Reference system: Geocentric
- Regime: Molniya
- Perigee altitude: 632 km (393 mi)
- Apogee altitude: 39,725 km (24,684 mi)
- Inclination: 62.9 degrees
- Period: 717.84 min

Kosmos 2176 (Russian: Космос 2176 meaning Cosmos 2176) was a Russian US-K early warning satellite which was launched in 1992 as part of the Russian Space Forces' Oko programme. The satellite was designed to identify missile launches using optical telescopes and infrared sensors.

Kosmos 2176 was launched from Site 43/3 at Plesetsk Cosmodrome in Russia. A Molniya-M carrier rocket with a 2BL upper stage was used to perform the launch, which took place at 01:18 UTC on 24 January 1992. The launch successfully placed the satellite into a molniya orbit. It subsequently received its Kosmos designation, and the international designator 1992-003A. The United States Space Command assigned it the Satellite Catalog Number 21847.

It re-entered the Earth's atmosphere on January 17, 2012.

== See also ==
- List of Kosmos satellites (2001–2250)
- List of R-7 launches (1990–1994)
- 1992 in spaceflight
