= Kosmos 2217 =

Russian military early warning satellite

- Mission type: Early warning
- COSPAR ID: 1992-069A
- SATCAT no.: 22189
- Mission duration: 4 years

Spacecraft properties
- Spacecraft type: US-K
- Launch mass: 1,900 kilograms (4,200 lb)

Start of mission
- Launch date: 21 October 1992, 10:21 UTC
- Rocket: Molniya-M/2BL
- Launch site: Plesetsk Cosmodrome

End of mission
- Decay date: 6 November 2010

Orbital parameters
- Reference system: Geocentric
- Regime: Molniya
- Perigee altitude: 645 kilometres (401 mi)
- Apogee altitude: 39,720 kilometres (24,680 mi)
- Inclination: 62.9 degrees
- Period: 718.00 minutes

Kosmos 2217 (Russian: Космос 2217 meaning Cosmos 2217) is a Russian US-K missile early warning satellite which was launched in 1992 as part of the Russian Space Forces' Oko programme. The satellite is designed to identify missile launches using optical telescopes and infrared sensors.

Kosmos 2217 was launched from Site 16/2 at Plesetsk Cosmodrome in Russia. A Molniya-M carrier rocket with a 2BL upper stage was used to perform the launch, which took place at 10:21 UTC on 21 October 1992. The launch successfully placed the satellite into a molniya orbit. It subsequently received its Kosmos designation, and the international designator 1992-069A. The United States Space Command assigned it the Satellite Catalog Number 22189.

It re-entered the Earth's atmosphere on 6 November 2010.

== See also ==
- List of Kosmos satellites (2001–2250)
- List of R-7 launches (1990–1994)
- 1992 in spaceflight
- List of Oko satellites
