= Kosmos 2232 =

Russian military early warning satellite

- Mission type: Early warning
- COSPAR ID: 1993-006A
- SATCAT no.: 22321
- Mission duration: 4 years

Spacecraft properties
- Spacecraft type: US-K
- Launch mass: 1,900 kilograms (4,200 lb)

Start of mission
- Launch date: 26 January 1993, 15:55 UTC
- Rocket: Molniya-M/2BL
- Launch site: Plesetsk Cosmodrome

Orbital parameters
- Reference system: Geocentric
- Regime: Molniya
- Perigee altitude: 614 kilometres (382 mi)
- Apogee altitude: 39,734 kilometres (24,690 mi)
- Inclination: 62.7 degrees
- Period: 717.64 minutes

Kosmos 2232 (Russian: Космос 2232 meaning Cosmos 2232) is a Russian US-K missile early warning satellite which was launched in 1993 as part of the Russian Space Forces' Oko programme. The satellite is designed to identify missile launches using optical telescopes and infrared sensors.

Kosmos 2232 was launched from Site 16/2 at Plesetsk Cosmodrome in Russia. A Molniya-M carrier rocket with a 2BL upper stage was used to perform the launch, which took place at 15:55 UTC on 26 January 1993. The launch successfully placed the satellite into a molniya orbit. It subsequently received its Kosmos designation, and the international designator 1993-006A. The United States Space Command assigned it the Satellite Catalog Number 22321.

== See also ==
- List of Kosmos satellites (2251–2500)
- List of R-7 launches (1990–1994)
- 1993 in spaceflight
- List of Oko satellites
