= Progress M-5 =

Soviet uncrewed cargo spacecraft

- Mission type: Mir resupply
- COSPAR ID: 1990-085A
- SATCAT no.: 20824

Spacecraft properties
- Spacecraft type: Progress-M 11F615A55
- Manufacturer: NPO Energia
- Launch mass: 7,250 kilograms (15,980 lb)

Start of mission
- Launch date: 27 September 1990, 10:37:42 UTC
- Rocket: Soyuz-U2
- Launch site: Baikonur Site 1/5

End of mission
- Disposal: Deorbited
- Decay date: 28 November 1990 UTC

Orbital parameters
- Reference system: Geocentric
- Regime: Low Earth
- Perigee altitude: 370 kilometres (230 mi)
- Apogee altitude: 411 kilometres (255 mi)
- Inclination: 51.6 degrees

Docking with Mir
- Docking port: Core Forward
- Docking date: 29 September 1990, 12:26:50 UTC
- Undocking date: 28 November 1990, 06:15:46 UTC
- Time docked: 59 days

Progress M-5 (Russian: Прогресс М-5) was a Soviet uncrewed cargo spacecraft which was launched in 1990 to resupply the Mir space station. The twenty-third of sixty four Progress spacecraft to visit Mir, it used the Progress-M 11F615A55 configuration, and had the serial number 206. It carried supplies including food, water and oxygen for the EO-7 crew aboard Mir, as well as equipment for conducting scientific research, and fuel for adjusting the station's orbit and performing manoeuvres. It was the first of ten Progress flights to carry a VBK-Raduga capsule, which was recovered after the flight.

Progress M-5 was launched at 10:37:42 GMT on 27 September 1990, atop a Soyuz-U2 carrier rocket flying from Site 1/5 at the Baikonur Cosmodrome. Following two days of free flight, it docked with the forward docking port of the core module at 12:26:50 GMT on 29 September.

During the 59 days for which Progress M-5 was docked, Mir was in an orbit of around 370 by 411 kilometres (200 by 222 nmi), inclined at 51.6 degrees. Progress M-5 undocked from Mir at 06:15:46 GMT on 28 November, and was deorbited a few hours later at 10:24:28. It burned up in the atmosphere over the Pacific Ocean, with any remaining debris landing in the ocean. The Raduga capsule returned to Earth by parachute, and landed in Russia at 11:04:05 GMT.

== See also ==
- 1990 in spaceflight
- List of Progress flights
- List of uncrewed spaceflights to Mir
