= CRRES =

NASA satellite

CRRES (P86-1)
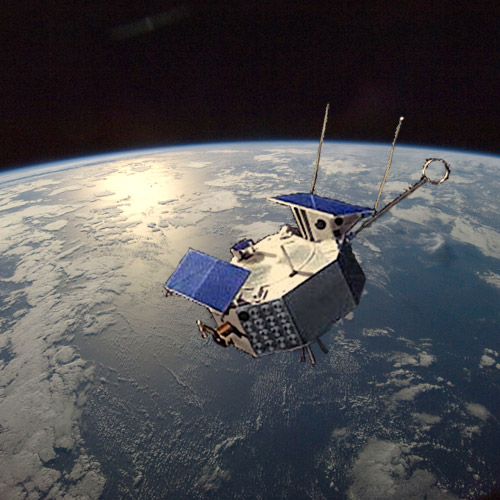
- Illustration of CRRES
- Operator: NASA / STP
- COSPAR ID: 1990-065A
- SATCAT no.: 20712
- Mission duration: Final: 1 year, 2 months, 16 days

Spacecraft properties
- Manufacturer: Ball Aerospace
- Launch mass: 4,383 kg (9,663 lb)

Start of mission
- Launch date: July 25, 1990, 19:21 UTC
- Rocket: Atlas I AC-69
- Launch site: Cape Canaveral LC-36B

End of mission
- Disposal: Contact lost
- Last contact: October 12, 1991

Orbital parameters
- Reference system: Geocentric
- Regime: GTO
- Semi-major axis: 23,198.0 km (14,414.6 mi)
- Eccentricity: 0.7101031
- Perigee altitude: 347.0 km (215.6 mi)
- Apogee altitude: 33,293 km (20,687 mi)
- Inclination: 18.150°
- Period: 613.4 minutes
- RAAN: 78.3921°
- Argument of perigee: 251.6790°
- Mean anomaly: 24.3699°
- Mean motion: 2.45705642
- Epoch: May 31, 2016, 23:13:47 UTC

The Combined Release and Radiation Effects Satellite (CRRES) was launched on July 25, 1990, into a geosynchronous transfer orbit (GTO) for a nominal three-year mission to investigate fields, plasmas, and energetic particles inside the Earth's magnetosphere. As part of the CRRES program, the SPACERAD (Space Radiation Effects) project, managed by Air Force Geophysics Laboratory, investigated the radiation environment of the inner and outer radiation belts and measured radiation effects on state-of-the-art microelectronics devices.

CRRES carried an array experiments including chemical releases and a complement of sophisticated scientific instruments to accomplish these objectives. Other chemical release active experiments were performed with sub-orbital rocket probes. The chemical releases 'painted' the magnetic and electric fields of earthspace with clouds of glowing ions. Earthspace was the laboratory, and the releases were studied with an extensive network of ground-, aircraft-, and satellite-based diagnostic instruments.

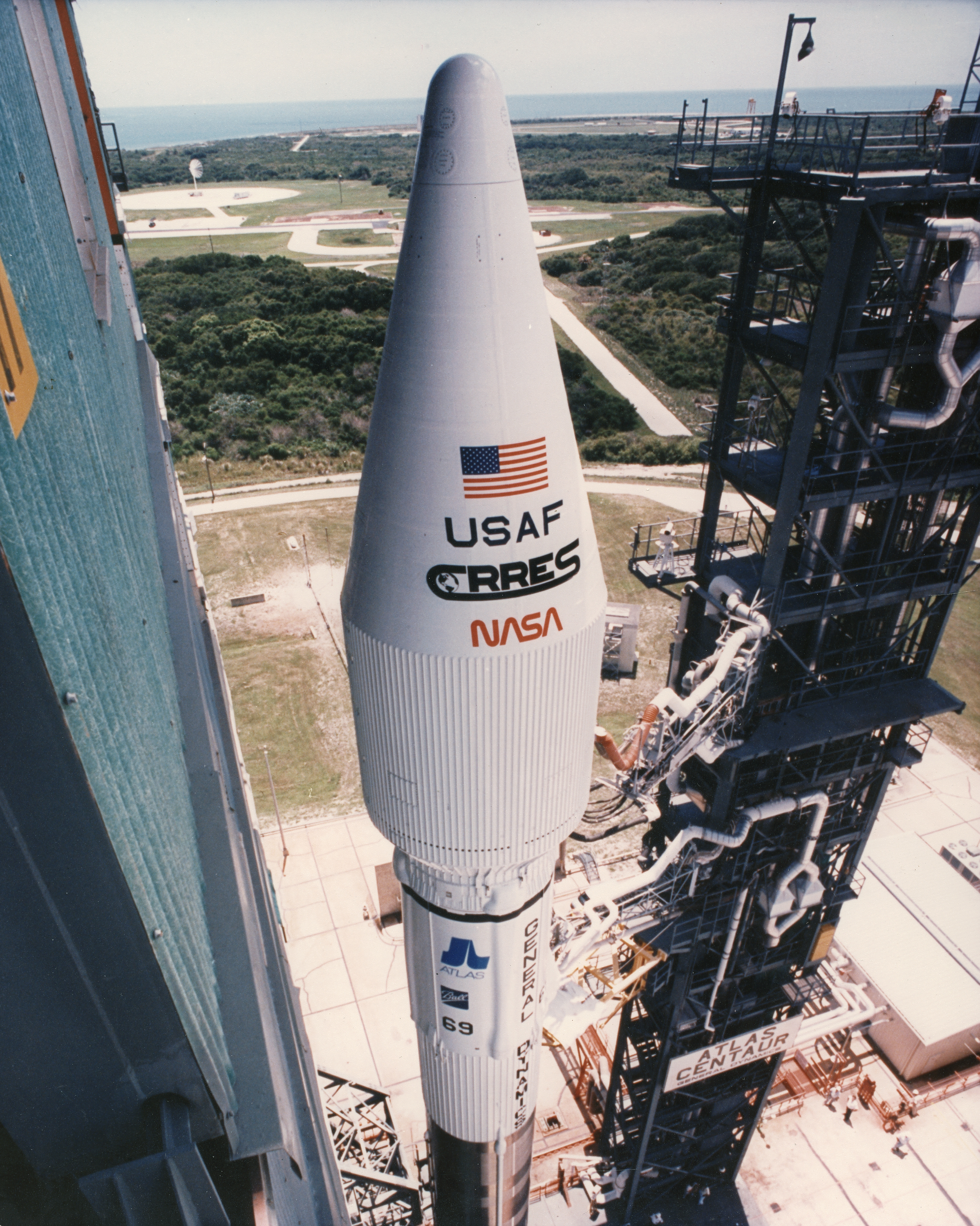
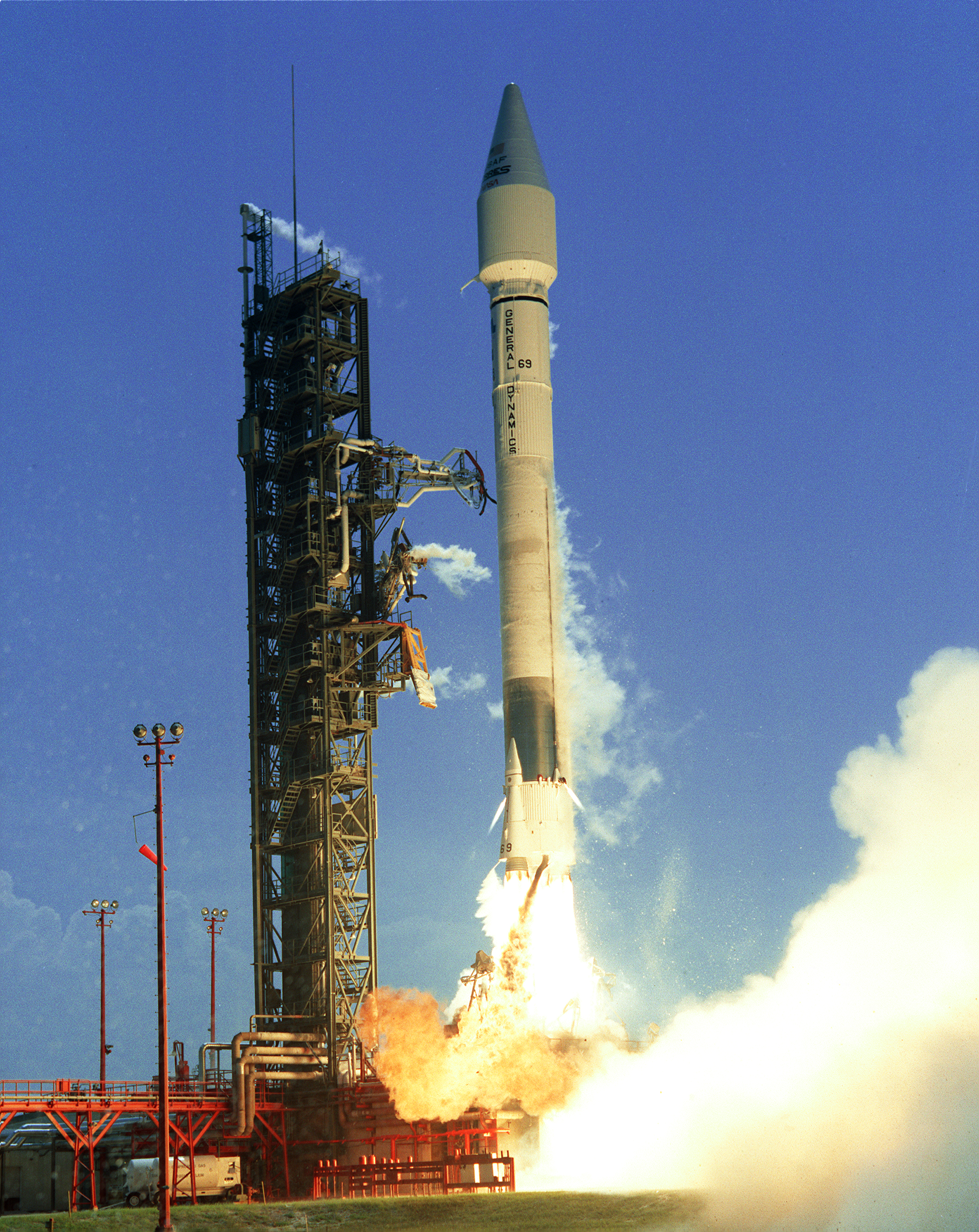
On Left CRRES during rollout and on right CRRES launch aboard Atlas I

Other magnetospheric, ionospheric, and cosmic ray experiments were also included onboard CRRES and supported by NASA or the Office of Naval Research. The chemical release project was managed by NASA/MSFC and utilized the release of chemicals from onboard canisters at low altitudes near dawn and dusk perigee times and at high altitudes near local midnight. The chemical releases were monitored with optical and radar instrumentation by ground-based observers to measure the bulk properties and movement of the expanding clouds of photo-ionized plasma along field lines after the releases occurred. In order to study the magnetosphere at different local times during the mission, the satellite orbit was designed to precess with respect to the Earth-Sun line such that the local time at apogee decreased by 2.5 minutes/day from 08:00 (LT) just after launch and returned to this position in nineteen month cycles.

The CRRES spacecraft had the shape of an octagonal prism with solar arrays on the top side. The prism is 1 m high and 3 m between opposite faces. Four of the eight compartments were for the chemical canisters and the other four housed the Space Radiation Effects and other experiments. The spacecraft body was spun at 2.2 rpm about a spin axis in the ecliptic plane and kept pointed about 12 degrees ahead of the Sun's apparent motion in celestial coordinates. The spacecraft was built by Ball Aerospace and was originally intended for launch by the U.S. Space Shuttle. The Challenger accident in 1986 resulted in a need to reconfigure the spacecraft and mission for launch by a medium expendable launch vehicle (Atlas I). Pre-launch and in-flight operations were supported by the Space Test and Transportation Program Office of the U.S. Air Force Space Division.

Communications with CRRES abruptly stopped on October 12, 1991. Analysis presumed that an onboard battery failure resulted in loss of power to various systems resulting in a premature end to the mission about one year after launch instead of the original three-year plan.
