= Progress M-4 =

1990 Soviet uncrewed cargo spacecraft

- Mission type: Mir resupply
- COSPAR ID: 1990-072A
- SATCAT no.: 20752

Spacecraft properties
- Spacecraft type: Progress-M 11F615A55
- Manufacturer: NPO Energia
- Launch mass: 7,250 kilograms (15,980 lb)

Start of mission
- Launch date: 15 August 1990, 04:00:41 UTC
- Rocket: Soyuz-U2
- Launch site: Baikonur Site 1/5

End of mission
- Disposal: Deorbited
- Decay date: 20 September 1990, 11:42:49 UTC

Orbital parameters
- Reference system: Geocentric
- Regime: Low Earth
- Perigee altitude: 368 kilometres (229 mi)
- Apogee altitude: 403 kilometres (250 mi)
- Inclination: 51.6 degrees

Docking with Mir
- Docking port: Core Forward
- Docking date: 17 August 1990, 05:26:13 UTC
- Undocking date: 17 September 1990, 12:42:43 UTC
- Time docked: 1 month

Progress M-4 (Russian: Прогресс М-4) was a Soviet uncrewed cargo spacecraft which was launched in 1990 to resupply the Mir space station. The twenty-second of sixty four Progress spacecraft to visit Mir, it used the Progress-M 11F615A55 configuration, and had the serial number 204. It carried supplies including food, water and oxygen for the EO-7 crew aboard Mir, as well as equipment for conducting scientific research, and fuel for adjusting the station's orbit and performing manoeuvres.

Progress M-4 was launched at 04:00:41 GMT on 15 August 1990, atop a Soyuz-U2 carrier rocket flying from Site 1/5 at the Baikonur Cosmodrome. It docked with the forward port of Mir's Core module at 05:26:13 GMT on 17 August.

During the month for which Progress M-4 was docked, Mir was in an orbit of around 368 by 403 kilometres (199 by 218 nmi), inclined at 51.6 degrees. Progress M-4 undocked from Mir at 12:42:43 GMT on 17 September, and was deorbited three days later on 20 September, with the deorbit burn starting at 11:04:27. It burned up in the atmosphere over the Pacific Ocean, with remaining debris landing in the ocean at around 11:42:49.

== See also ==
- 1990 in spaceflight
- List of Progress flights
- List of uncrewed spaceflights to Mir
