= Kosmos 2175 =

Russian photo reconnaissance satellite

- Mission type: Reconnaissance
- Operator: VKS
- COSPAR ID: 1992-001A
- SATCAT no.: 21844

Spacecraft properties
- Spacecraft type: Yantar-4K2

Start of mission
- Launch date: 21 January 1992, 15:00:00 UTC
- Rocket: Soyuz-U
- Launch site: Plesetsk Cosmodrome 43/3

End of mission
- Landing date: 20 March 1992

Orbital parameters
- Reference system: Geocentric
- Regime: Low Earth
- Eccentricity: 0.01502
- Perigee altitude: 158 kilometres (98 mi)
- Apogee altitude: 347 kilometres (216 mi)
- Inclination: 67.1 degrees
- Period: 89.6 minutes
- Epoch: 20 January 1992, 19:00:00 UTC

Kosmos 2175 (Russian: Космос-2175 meaning Cosmos 2175) was a Russian Yantar-4K2 photo reconnaissance satellite. It was the first satellite to be launched by the Russian Federation, following the breakup of the Soviet Union. It was launched by a Soyuz-U carrier rocket, flying from the Plesetsk Cosmodrome, on 21 January 1992.

It was the 63rd Yantar-4K2 satellite. Yantar-4K2 spacecraft are also designated Kobal't. Kosmos 2175 was deorbited, and recovered after atmospheric re-entry, on 20 March 1992, following a successful mission. Prior to this, two capsules had been returned with imagery aboard.
