= Progress 42 =

Soviet uncrewed Progress cargo spacecraft

- A Progress 7K-TG spacecraft
- Mission type: Mir resupply
- COSPAR ID: 1990-041A
- SATCAT no.: 20602

Spacecraft properties
- Spacecraft: Progress (No.150)
- Spacecraft type: Progress 7K-TG
- Manufacturer: NPO Energia

Start of mission
- Launch date: 5 May 1990, 20:44:01 UTC
- Rocket: Soyuz-U2
- Launch site: Baikonur, Site 1/5

End of mission
- Disposal: Deorbited
- Decay date: 27 May 1990, 11:40:00 UTC

Orbital parameters
- Reference system: Geocentric
- Regime: Low Earth
- Perigee altitude: 188 km
- Apogee altitude: 243 km
- Inclination: 51.6°
- Period: 88.8 minutes
- Epoch: 5 May 1990

Docking with Mir
- Docking port: Kvant-1 aft
- Docking date: 7 May 1990, 22:45:03 UTC
- Undocking date: 27 May 1990, 07:08:58 UTC

Progress 42 (Russian: Прогресс 42) was a Soviet unmanned Progress cargo spacecraft, which was launched in May 1990 to resupply the Mir space station.

== Launch ==
Progress 42 launched on 5 May 1990 from the Baikonur Cosmodrome in the Kazakh SSR. It used a Soyuz-U2 rocket.

== Docking ==
Progress 42 docked with the aft port of the Kvant-1 module of Mir on 7 May 1990 at 22:45:03 UTC, and was undocked on 27 May 1990 at 07:08:58 UTC.

== Decay ==
It remained in orbit until 27 May 1990, when it was deorbited. The deorbit burn occurred at 11:40:00 UTC and the mission ended at 12:27:30 UTC.

== See also ==
- 1990 in spaceflight
- List of Progress missions
- List of uncrewed spaceflights to Mir
