= Orlets-1 =

Decommissioned Russian reconnaissance satellite

Orlets-1 or Don (GRAU index 17F12) was a Russian (previously Soviet) reconnaissance satellite.

Orlets-1 was developed after the Yantar-2K satellite was deemed incapable of providing strategic warning of attack. It drew on features of an existing draft project called Yantar-6K. Equipped with a wide-spectrum panoramic camera and carrying eight film return capsules, Orlets-1 had a design life of 60 days. After completing its mission, the satellite was detonated in its orbit.

The Soyuz-U or Soyuz-U2 launch vehicle was used to deploy Orlets-1. An improved version, Orlets-2, was also created.
