= Kosmos 1247 =

Soviet military early warning satellite

- Mission type: Early warning
- COSPAR ID: 1981-016A
- SATCAT no.: 12303
- Mission duration: 4 years

Spacecraft properties
- Spacecraft type: US-K
- Launch mass: 1,900 kilograms (4,200 lb)

Start of mission
- Launch date: 19 February 1981, 10:00 UTC
- Rocket: Molniya-M/2BL
- Launch site: Plesetsk Cosmodrome

End of mission
- Deactivated: 20 October 1981

Orbital parameters
- Reference system: Geocentric
- Regime: Molniya
- Perigee altitude: 648 kilometres (403 mi)
- Apogee altitude: 39,708 kilometres (24,673 mi)
- Inclination: 62.9 degrees
- Period: 717.82 minutes

Kosmos 1247 (Russian: Космос 1247 meaning Cosmos 1247) was a Soviet US-K missile early warning satellite which was launched in 1981 as part of the Soviet military's Oko programme. The satellite was designed to identify missile launches using optical telescopes and infrared sensors.

Kosmos 1247 was launched from Site 16/2 at Plesetsk Cosmodrome in the Russian SSR. A Molniya-M carrier rocket with a 2BL upper stage was used to perform the launch, which took place at 10:00 UTC on 19 February 1981. The launch successfully placed the satellite into a molniya orbit. It subsequently received its Kosmos designation, and the international designator 1981-016A. The United States Space Command assigned it the Satellite Catalog Number 12303.

Kosmos 1247 was a US-K satellite like Kosmos 862 that NASA believes deliberately self-destructed in orbit. It was observed to have completed the first burn in a 2-phase maneuver sequence on 20 October 1981, followed by debris generation. All but one of the resultant debris pieces are still in orbit.

== See also ==
- 1981 in spaceflight
- List of Kosmos satellites (1251–1500)
- List of Oko satellites
- List of R-7 launches (1980-1984)
