= Kosmos 1604 =

Soviet military early warning satellite

- Mission type: Early warning
- COSPAR ID: 1984-107A
- SATCAT no.: 15350
- Mission duration: 4 years

Spacecraft properties
- Spacecraft type: US-K
- Launch mass: 1,900 kilograms (4,200 lb)

Start of mission
- Launch date: 4 October 1984, 19:49 UTC
- Rocket: Molniya-M/2BL
- Launch site: Plesetsk Cosmodrome

End of mission
- Deactivated: 27 September 1985

Orbital parameters
- Reference system: Geocentric
- Regime: Molniya
- Perigee altitude: 625 kilometres (388 mi)
- Apogee altitude: 39,727 kilometres (24,685 mi)
- Inclination: 62.9 degrees
- Period: 717.74 minutes

Kosmos 1604 (Russian: Космос 1604 meaning Cosmos 1604) is a Soviet US-K missile early warning satellite which was launched in 1984 as part of the Soviet military's Oko programme. The satellite is designed to identify missile launches using optical telescopes and infrared sensors.

Kosmos 1604 was launched from Site 16/2 at Plesetsk Cosmodrome in the Russian SSR. A Molniya-M carrier rocket with a 2BL upper stage was used to perform the launch, which took place at 19:49 UTC on 4 October 1984. The launch successfully placed the satellite into a molniya orbit. It subsequently received its Kosmos designation, and the international designator 1984-107A. The United States Space Command assigned it the Satellite Catalog Number 15350.

== See also ==
- List of Kosmos satellites (1501–1750)
- List of R-7 launches (1980-1984)
- 1984 in spaceflight
- List of Oko satellites
