= Kosmos 1317 =

Soviet military early warning satellite

- Mission type: Early warning
- COSPAR ID: 1981-108A
- SATCAT no.: 12933
- Mission duration: 4 years

Spacecraft properties
- Spacecraft type: US-K
- Launch mass: 1,900 kilograms (4,200 lb)

Start of mission
- Launch date: 31 October 1981, 22:54 UTC
- Rocket: Molniya-M/2BL
- Launch site: Plesetsk Cosmodrome

End of mission
- Deactivated: 26 January 1984

Orbital parameters
- Reference system: Geocentric
- Regime: Molniya
- Perigee altitude: 608 kilometres (378 mi)
- Apogee altitude: 39,723 kilometres (24,683 mi)
- Inclination: 62.9 degrees
- Period: 717.29 minutes

Kosmos 1317 (Russian: Космос 1317 meaning Cosmos 1317) was a Soviet US-K missile early warning satellite which was launched in 1981 as part of the Soviet military's Oko programme. The satellite was designed to identify missile launches using optical telescopes and infrared sensors.

Kosmos 1317 was launched from Site 16/2 at Plesetsk Cosmodrome in the Russian SSR. A Molniya-M carrier rocket with a 2BL upper stage was used to perform the launch, which took place at 22:54 UTC on 31 October 1981. The launch successfully placed the satellite into a molniya orbit. It subsequently received its Kosmos designation, and the international designator 1981-108A . The United States Space Command assigned it the Satellite Catalog Number 12933.

Kosmos 1317 was a US-K satellite like Kosmos 862 that self-destructed in orbit, NASA believe deliberately. The first debris elements were spotted on 25 May 1981. All of the resultant debris is still in orbit.

== See also ==
- 1981 in spaceflight
- List of Kosmos satellites (1251–1500)
- List of Oko satellites
- List of R-7 launches (1980-1984)
