= Kosmos 1223 =

Soviet missile early warning satellite

- Mission type: Early warning
- COSPAR ID: 1980-095A
- SATCAT no.: 12078
- Mission duration: 4 years

Spacecraft properties
- Spacecraft type: US-K
- Launch mass: 1,900 kilograms (4,200 lb)

Start of mission
- Launch date: 27 November 1980, 21:37 UTC
- Rocket: Molniya-M/2BL
- Launch site: Plesetsk Cosmodrome

End of mission
- Deactivated: 11 August 1982

Orbital parameters
- Reference system: Geocentric
- Regime: Molniya
- Perigee altitude: 663 kilometres (412 mi)
- Apogee altitude: 39,697 kilometres (24,667 mi)
- Inclination: 62.9 degrees
- Period: 717.90 minutes

Kosmos 1223 (Russian: Космос 1223 meaning Cosmos 1223) was a Soviet US-K missile early warning satellite, which was launched in 1980 as part of the Soviet military's Oko programme. The satellite was designed to identify missile launches using optical telescopes and infrared sensors.

Kosmos 1223 was launched from Site 41/1 at Plesetsk Cosmodrome in the Russian SSR. A Molniya-M carrier rocket with a 2BL upper stage was used to perform the launch, which took place at 21:37 UTC on 27 November 1980. The launch successfully placed the satellite into a molniya orbit.

It subsequently received its Kosmos designation, and the international designator 1980-095A. The United States Space Command assigned it the Satellite Catalog Number 12078.

== See also ==
- List of Kosmos satellites (1001–1250)
- List of R-7 launches (1980-1984)
- 1980 in spaceflight
- List of Oko satellites
