= Kosmos 1518 =

Soviet military early warning satellite

- Mission type: Early warning
- COSPAR ID: 1983-126A
- SATCAT no.: 14587
- Mission duration: 4 years

Spacecraft properties
- Spacecraft type: US-K
- Launch mass: 1,900 kilograms (4,200 lb)

Start of mission
- Launch date: 28 December 1983, 03:48 UTC
- Rocket: Molniya-M/2BL
- Launch site: Plesetsk Cosmodrome

End of mission
- Deactivated: 1 June 1984
- Decay date: 19 September 1998

Orbital parameters
- Reference system: Geocentric
- Regime: Molniya
- Perigee altitude: 614 kilometres (382 mi)
- Apogee altitude: 39,768 kilometres (24,711 mi)
- Inclination: 63.0 degrees
- Period: 718.35 minutes

Kosmos 1518 (Russian: Космос 1518 meaning Cosmos 1518) was a Soviet US-K missile early warning satellite which was launched in 1983 as part of the Soviet military's Oko programme. The satellite was designed to identify missile launches using optical telescopes and infrared sensors.

Kosmos 1518 was launched from Site 16/2 at Plesetsk Cosmodrome in the Russian SSR. A Molniya-M carrier rocket with a 2BL upper stage was used to perform the launch, which took place at 03:48 UTC on 28 December 1983. The launch successfully placed the satellite into a molniya orbit. It subsequently received its Kosmos designation, and the international designator 1983-126A. The United States Space Command assigned it the Satellite Catalog Number 14587.

It reentered the Earth's atmosphere on 19 September 1998.

== See also ==
- 1983 in spaceflight
- List of Kosmos satellites (1501–1750)
- List of Oko satellites
- List of R-7 launches (1980-1984)
