= Kosmos 1569 =

Soviet military early warning satellite

- Mission type: Early warning
- COSPAR ID: 1984-055A
- SATCAT no.: 15027
- Mission duration: 4 years

Spacecraft properties
- Spacecraft type: US-K
- Launch mass: 1,900 kilograms (4,200 lb)

Start of mission
- Launch date: 6 June 1984, 15:34 UTC
- Rocket: Molniya-M/2BL
- Launch site: Plesetsk Cosmodrome

End of mission
- Deactivated: 26 January 1986
- Decay date: 7 May 2001

Orbital parameters
- Reference system: Geocentric
- Regime: Molniya
- Perigee altitude: 611 kilometres (380 mi)
- Apogee altitude: 39,748 kilometres (24,698 mi)
- Inclination: 63.0 degrees
- Period: 717.88 minutes

Kosmos 1569 (Russian: Космос 1569 meaning Cosmos 1569) was a Soviet US-K missile early warning satellite which was launched in 1984 as part of the Soviet military's Oko programme. The satellite was designed to identify missile launches using optical telescopes and infrared sensors.

Kosmos 1569 was launched from Site 16/2 at Plesetsk Cosmodrome in the Russian SSR. A Molniya-M carrier rocket with a 2BL upper stage was used to perform the launch, which took place at 15:34 UTC on 6 June 1984. The launch successfully placed the satellite into a molniya orbit. It subsequently received its Kosmos designation, and the international designator 1984-055A. The United States Space Command assigned it the Satellite Catalog Number 15027.

It re-entered the Earth's atmosphere on 7 May 2001.

== See also ==
- List of Kosmos satellites (1501–1750)
- List of R-7 launches (1980-1984)
- 1984 in spaceflight
- List of Oko satellites
