= Kosmos 1217 =

Soviet military early warning satellite

- Mission type: Early warning
- COSPAR ID: 1980-085A
- SATCAT no.: 12032
- Mission duration: 4 years

Spacecraft properties
- Spacecraft type: US-K
- Launch mass: 1,900 kilograms (4,200 lb)

Start of mission
- Launch date: 24 October 1980, 10:53 UTC
- Rocket: Molniya-M/2BL
- Launch site: Plesetsk Cosmodrome

End of mission
- Deactivated: 20 March 1983

Orbital parameters
- Reference system: Geocentric
- Regime: Molniya
- Perigee altitude: 769 kilometres (478 mi)
- Apogee altitude: 39,582 kilometres (24,595 mi)
- Inclination: 63.0 degrees
- Period: 717.72 minutes

Kosmos 1217 (Russian: Космос 1217 meaning Cosmos 1217) was a Soviet US-K missile early warning satellite which was launched in 1980 as part of the Soviet military's Oko programme. The satellite was designed to identify missile launches using optical telescopes and infrared sensors.

Kosmos 1217 was launched from Site 41/1 at Plesetsk Cosmodrome in the Russian SSR. A Molniya-M carrier rocket with a 2BL upper stage was used to perform the launch, which took place at 10:53 UTC on 24 October 1980. The launch successfully placed the satellite into a molniya orbit. It subsequently received its Kosmos designation, and the international designator 1980-085A. The United States Space Command assigned it the Satellite Catalog Number 12032.

== See also ==
- 1980 in spaceflight
- List of Kosmos satellites (1001–1250)
- List of Oko satellites
- List of R-7 launches (1980-1984)
