= Kosmos 1367 =

Soviet military early warning satellite

- Mission type: Early warning
- COSPAR ID: 1982-045A
- SATCAT no.: 13205
- Mission duration: 4 years

Spacecraft properties
- Spacecraft type: US-K
- Launch mass: 1,900 kilograms (4,200 lb)

Start of mission
- Launch date: 20 May 1982, 13:09 UTC
- Rocket: Molniya-M/2BL
- Launch site: Plesetsk Cosmodrome

End of mission
- Deactivated: 30 September 1984

Orbital parameters
- Reference system: Geocentric
- Regime: Molniya
- Perigee altitude: 603 kilometres (375 mi)
- Apogee altitude: 39,760 kilometres (24,710 mi)
- Inclination: 62.9 degrees
- Period: 717.96 minutes

Kosmos 1367 (Russian: Космос 1367 meaning Cosmos 1367) was a Soviet US-K missile early warning satellite which was launched in 1982 as part of the Soviet military's Oko programme. The satellite was designed to identify missile launches using optical telescopes and infrared sensors.

Kosmos 1367 was launched from Site 41/1 at Plesetsk Cosmodrome in the Russian SSR. A Molniya-M carrier rocket with a 2BL upper stage was used to perform the launch, which took place at 13:09 UTC on 20 May 1982. The launch successfully placed the satellite into a molniya orbit. It subsequently received its Kosmos designation, and the international designator 1982-045A. The United States Space Command assigned it the Satellite Catalog Number 13205.

== See also ==
- 1982 in spaceflight
- List of Kosmos satellites (1251–1500)
- List of Oko satellites
- List of R-7 launches (1980-1984)
