= Kosmos 1341 =

Soviet military early warning satellite

- Mission type: Early warning
- COSPAR ID: 1982-016A
- SATCAT no.: 13080
- Mission duration: 4 years

Spacecraft properties
- Spacecraft type: US-K
- Launch mass: 1,900 kilograms (4,200 lb)

Start of mission
- Launch date: 3 March 1982, 05:44 UTC
- Rocket: Molniya-M/2BL
- Launch site: Plesetsk Cosmodrome

End of mission
- Deactivated: 1 February 1984

Orbital parameters
- Reference system: Geocentric
- Regime: Molniya
- Perigee altitude: 672 kilometres (418 mi)
- Apogee altitude: 39,688 kilometres (24,661 mi)
- Inclination: 62.9 degrees
- Period: 717.90 minutes

Kosmos 1341 (Russian: Космос 1341 meaning Cosmos 1341) was a Soviet US-K missile early warning satellite which was launched in 1982 as part of the Soviet military's Oko programme. The satellite was designed to identify missile launches using optical telescopes and infrared sensors.

Kosmos 1341 was launched from Site 16/2 at Plesetsk Cosmodrome in the Russian SSR. A Molniya-M carrier rocket with a 2BL upper stage was used to perform the launch, which took place at 05:44 UTC on 3 March 1982. The launch successfully placed the satellite into a molniya orbit. It subsequently received its Kosmos designation, and the international designator 1982-016A. The United States Space Command assigned it the Satellite Catalog Number 13080.

== See also ==
- 1982 in spaceflight
- List of Kosmos satellites (1251–1500)
- List of Oko satellites
- List of R-7 launches (1980-1984)
