= Kosmos 1541 =

Russian military early warning satellite

- Mission type: Early warning
- COSPAR ID: 1984-024A
- SATCAT no.: 14790
- Mission duration: 4 years

Spacecraft properties
- Spacecraft type: US-K
- Launch mass: 1,900 kilograms (4,200 lb)

Start of mission
- Launch date: 6 March 1984, 17:10 UTC
- Rocket: Molniya-M/2BL
- Launch site: Plesetsk Cosmodrome

End of mission
- Deactivated: 31 October 1985

Orbital parameters
- Reference system: Geocentric
- Regime: Molniya
- Perigee altitude: 613 kilometres (381 mi)
- Apogee altitude: 39,738 kilometres (24,692 mi)
- Inclination: 63.0 degrees
- Period: 717.72 minutes

Kosmos 1541 (Russian: Космос 1541 meaning Cosmos 1541) is a Soviet US-K missile early warning satellite which was launched in 1984 as part of the Soviet military's Oko programme. The satellite is designed to identify missile launches using optical telescopes and infrared sensors.

Kosmos 1541 was launched from Site 16/2 at Plesetsk Cosmodrome in the Russian SSR. A Molniya-M carrier rocket with a 2BL upper stage was used to perform the launch, which took place at 17:10 UTC on 6 March 1984. The launch successfully placed the satellite into a molniya orbit. It subsequently received its Kosmos designation, and the international designator 1984-024A. The United States Space Command assigned it the Satellite Catalog Number 14790.

== See also ==
- List of Kosmos satellites (1501–1750)
- List of R-7 launches (1980-1984)
- 1984 in spaceflight
- List of Oko satellites
