= Kosmos 1191 =

Soviet military early warning satellite

- Mission type: Early warning
- COSPAR ID: 1980-057A
- SATCAT no.: 11871
- Mission duration: 4 years

Spacecraft properties
- Spacecraft type: US-K
- Launch mass: 1,900 kilograms (4,200 lb)

Start of mission
- Launch date: 2 July 1980, 00:54 UTC
- Rocket: Molniya-M/2BL
- Launch site: Plesetsk Cosmodrome

End of mission
- Deactivated: 16 May 1981

Orbital parameters
- Reference system: Geocentric
- Regime: Molniya
- Perigee altitude: 640 kilometres (400 mi)
- Apogee altitude: 39,705 kilometres (24,672 mi)
- Inclination: 62.6 degrees
- Period: 717.60 minutes

Kosmos 1191 (Russian: Космос 1191 meaning Cosmos 1191) was a Soviet US-K missile early warning satellite which was launched in 1980 as part of the Soviet military's Oko programme. The satellite was designed to identify missile launches using optical telescopes and infrared sensors.

Kosmos 1191 was launched from Site 41/1 at Plesetsk Cosmodrome in the Russian SSR. A Molniya-M carrier rocket with a 2BL upper stage was used to perform the launch, which took place at 00:54 UTC on 2 July 1980. The launch successfully placed the satellite into a molniya orbit. It subsequently received its Kosmos designation, and the international designator 1980-057A. The United States Space Command assigned it the Satellite Catalog Number 11871.

Kosmos 1191 was a US-K satellite like Kosmos 862 that self-destructed in orbit, NASA believes deliberately. The first debris elements were spotted on 25 May 1981. All of the resultant debris is still in orbit.

== See also ==
- 1980 in spaceflight
- List of Kosmos satellites (1001–1250)
- List of Oko satellites
- List of R-7 launches (1980-1984)
