= Kosmos 1596 =

Soviet military early warning satellite

- Mission type: Early warning
- COSPAR ID: 1984-096A
- SATCAT no.: 15267
- Mission duration: 4 years

Spacecraft properties
- Spacecraft type: US-K
- Launch mass: 1,900 kilograms (4,200 lb)

Start of mission
- Launch date: 7 September 1984, 19:13 UTC
- Rocket: Molniya-M/2BL
- Launch site: Plesetsk Cosmodrome

End of mission
- Deactivated: 26 November 1986

Orbital parameters
- Reference system: Geocentric
- Regime: Molniya
- Perigee altitude: 654 kilometres (406 mi)
- Apogee altitude: 39,704 kilometres (24,671 mi)
- Inclination: 62.9 degrees
- Period: 717.84 minutes

Kosmos 1596 (Russian: Космос 1596 meaning Cosmos 1596) is a Russian US-K missile early warning satellite which was launched in 1984 by the Soviet Union as part of its military's Oko programme. The satellite is designed to identify missile launches using optical telescopes and infrared sensors.

Kosmos 1596 was launched from Site 16/2 at Plesetsk Cosmodrome in the Russian SSR. A Molniya-M carrier rocket with a 2BL upper stage was used to perform the launch, which took place at 19:13 UTC on 7 September 1984. The launch successfully placed the satellite into a molniya orbit. It subsequently received its Kosmos designation, and the international designator 1984-096A. The United States Space Command assigned it the Satellite Catalog Number 15267.

== See also ==
- List of Kosmos satellites (1501–1750)
- List of R-7 launches (1980-1984)
- 1984 in spaceflight
- List of Oko satellites
