= List of Kosmos satellites (1501–1750) =

The designation Kosmos (Russian: Космос meaning Cosmos) is a generic name given to a large number of Soviet, and subsequently Russian, satellites, the first of which was launched in 1962. Satellites given Kosmos designations include military spacecraft, failed probes to the Moon and the planets, prototypes for crewed spacecraft, and scientific spacecraft. This is a list of satellites with Kosmos designations between 1501 and 1750.

Designation	Type	Launch date (GMT)	Carrier rocket	Function	Decay/Destruction*	Remarks
Kosmos 1501	Romb	30 September 1983; 11:00	Kosmos-3M 11K65M	Calibration	26 May 1989	
Kosmos 1502	Taifun-1B	5 October 1983; 12:00	Kosmos-3M 11K65M	Radar target	29 August 1985	
Kosmos 1503	Strela-2	12 October 1983; 00:20	Kosmos-3M 11K65M	Communication	in orbit	
Kosmos 1504	Yantar-4K2	14 October 1983; 10:00	Soyuz-U 11A511U	Reconnaissance	6 December 1983	
Kosmos 1505	Zenit-6	21 October 1983; 12:10	Soyuz-U 11A511U	Reconnaissance	4 November 1983	
Kosmos 1506	Tsikada	26 October 1983; 17:20	Kosmos-3M 11K65M	Navigation	in orbit	
Kosmos 1507	US-P	29 October 1983; 08:30	Tsyklon-2 11K69	ELINT	19 August 1987	
Kosmos 1508	Taifun-1	11 November 1983; 12:30	Kosmos-3M 11K65M	Radar target	in orbit	Orbit 400 x 1966 km. Inclination 82.9 degrees. Mass-possibly 550 kg. Recorded by RAE as 2500th successful launch.
Kosmos 1509	Zenit-6	17 November 1983; 12:15	Soyuz-U 11A511U	Reconnaissance	1 December 1983	
Kosmos 1510	Geo-IK	24 November 1983; 12:33	Tsyklon-3 11K68	Geodesy	in orbit	Third satellite in the upgraded second series of Soviet geodetic satellites. Carried out studies of the shape of the Earth and accurate mapping of the Earth's surface to enable accurate targeting of military missiles.
Kosmos 1511	Yantar-4K1	30 November 1983; 13:45	Soyuz-U 11A511U	Reconnaissance	13 January 1984	
Kosmos 1512	Zenit-6	7 December 1983; 12:10	Soyuz-U 11A511U	Reconnaissance	21 December 1983	
Kosmos 1513	Parus	8 December 1983; 06:13	Kosmos-3M 11K65M	Navigation, Communication	in orbit	
Kosmos 1514	Bion	14 December 1983; 07:00	Soyuz-U 11A511U	International Biosatellite carrying monkeys and rats.	19 December 1983	Orbit 215 x 260 km. Inclination 82 degrees. Mass-possibly 5700 kg. Recovered after 5 days.
Kosmos 1515	Tselina-D	15 December 1983; 12:25	Tsyklon-3 11K68	ELINT	in orbit	
Kosmos 1516	Yantar-1KFT	27 December 1983; 09:30	Soyuz-U 11A511U	Reconnaissance	9 February 1984	
Kosmos 1517	BOR-4	27 December 1983; 10:00	Kosmos-3MRB 11K65M-RB	Test	27 December 1983	Third orbital test of the BOR-4 prototype spaceplane
Kosmos 1518	US-K	28 December 1983; 03:48	Molniya-M 8K78M	Missile defence	19 September 1998	
Kosmos 1519	Glonass	29 December 1983; 00:52	Proton-K/DM-2 8K72K	Navigation	in orbit	
Kosmos 1520	Glonass	29 December 1983; 00:52	Proton-K/DM-2 8K72K	Navigation	in orbit	
Kosmos 1521	Glonass	29 December 1983; 00:52	Proton-K/DM-2 8K72K	Navigation	in orbit	
Kosmos 1522	Strela-1M	5 January 1984; 20:09	Kosmos-3M 11K65M	Communication	in orbit	
Kosmos 1523	Strela-1M	5 January 1984; 20:09	Kosmos-3M 11K65M	Communication	in orbit	
Kosmos 1524	Strela-1M	5 January 1984; 20:09	Kosmos-3M 11K65M	Communication	in orbit	
Kosmos 1525	Strela-1M	5 January 1984; 20:09	Kosmos-3M 11K65M	Communication	in orbit	
Kosmos 1526	Strela-1M	5 January 1984; 20:09	Kosmos-3M 11K65M	Communication	in orbit	
Kosmos 1527	Strela-1M	5 January 1984; 20:09	Kosmos-3M 11K65M	Communication	in orbit	
Kosmos 1528	Strela-1M	5 January 1984; 20:09	Kosmos-3M 11K65M	Communication	in orbit	
Kosmos 1529	Strela-1M	5 January 1984; 20:09	Kosmos-3M 11K65M	Communication	in orbit	
Kosmos 1530	Zenit-6	11 January 1984; 12:20	Soyuz-U 11A511U	Reconnaissance	25 January 1984	
Kosmos 1531	Parus	11 January 1984; 18:08	Kosmos-3M 11K65M	Navigation, Communication	in orbit	
Kosmos 1532	Yantar-4K2	13 January 1984; 14:40	Soyuz-U 11A511U	Reconnaissance	26 February 1984	
Kosmos 1533	Zenit-6	26 January 1984; 08:50	Soyuz-U2 11A511U2	Reconnaissance	9 February 1984	
Kosmos 1534	Taifun-1	26 January 1984; 12:00	Kosmos-3M 11K65M	Radar target	20 September 1990	
Kosmos 1535	Parus	2 February 1984; 17:38	Kosmos-3M 11K65M	Navigation, Communication	in orbit	
Kosmos 1536	Tselina-D	8 February 1984; 09:23	Tsyklon-3 11K68	ELINT	in orbit	
Kosmos 1537	Resurs-F1	16 February 1984; 08:15	Soyuz-U 11A511U	Remote sensing	1 March 1984	
Kosmos 1538	Strela-2	21 February 1984; 15:36	Kosmos-3M 11K65M	Communication	in orbit	
Kosmos 1539	Yantar-4K2	28 February 1984; 13:59	Soyuz-U 11A511U	Reconnaissance	9 April 1984	
Kosmos 1540	Potok	2 March 1984; 03:54	Proton-K/DM 8K72K	Communication	in orbit	
Kosmos 1541	US-K	6 March 1984; 17:10	Molniya-M 8K78M	Missile defence	in orbit	
Kosmos 1542	Zenit-6	7 March 1984; 08:00	Soyuz-U2 11A511U2	Reconnaissance	21 March 1984	
Kosmos 1543	Efir	10 March 1984; 17:00	Soyuz-U 11A511U	Magnetospheric	5 April 1984	
Kosmos 1544	Tselina-D	15 March 1984; 17:05	Tsyklon-3 11K68	ELINT	in orbit	
Kosmos 1545	Zenit-6	21 March 1984; 11:05	Soyuz-U 11A511U	Reconnaissance	5 April 1984	
Kosmos 1546	US-KS	29 March 1984; 05:53	Proton-K/DM 8K72K	Missile defence	in orbit	
Kosmos 1547	US-K	4 April 1984; 01:40	Molniya-M 8K78M	Missile defence	in orbit	
Kosmos 1548	Yantar-4K2	10 April 1984; 14:00	Soyuz-U 11A511U	Reconnaissance	25 May 1984	
Kosmos 1549	Zenit-6	19 April 1984; 11:40	Soyuz-U 11A511U	Reconnaissance	3 May 1984	
Kosmos 1550	Parus	11 May 1984; 06:19	Kosmos-3M 11K65M	Navigation, Communication	in orbit	
Kosmos 1551	Zenit-6	11 May 1984; 13:00	Soyuz-U 11A511U	Reconnaissance	23 May 1984	
Kosmos 1552	Yantar-4KS1	14 May 1984; 14:00	Soyuz-U 11A511U	Reconnaissance	3 November 1984	
Kosmos 1553	Tsikada	17 May 1984; 14:43	Kosmos-3M 11K65M	Navigation	in orbit	
Kosmos 1554	Glonass	19 May 1984; 15:11	Proton-K/DM-2 8K72K	Navigation	in orbit	
Kosmos 1555	Glonass	19 May 1984; 15:11	Proton-K/DM-2 8K72K	Navigation	in orbit	
Kosmos 1556	Glonass	19 May 1984; 15:11	Proton-K/DM-2 8K72K	Navigation	in orbit	
Kosmos 1557	Zenit-4MKT	22 May 1984; 08:30	Soyuz-U 11A511U	Reconnaissance	4 June 1984	
Kosmos 1558	Yantar-4K2	25 May 1984; 11:30	Soyuz-U 11A511U	Reconnaissance	8 July 1984	
Kosmos 1559	Strela-1M	28 May 1984; 21:52	Kosmos-3M 11K65M	Communication	in orbit	
Kosmos 1560	Strela-1M	28 May 1984; 21:52	Kosmos-3M 11K65M	Communication	in orbit	
Kosmos 1561	Strela-1M	28 May 1984; 21:52	Kosmos-3M 11K65M	Communication	in orbit	
Kosmos 1562	Strela-1M	28 May 1984; 21:52	Kosmos-3M 11K65M	Communication	in orbit	
Kosmos 1563	Strela-1M	28 May 1984; 21:52	Kosmos-3M 11K65M	Communication	in orbit	
Kosmos 1564	Strela-1M	28 May 1984; 21:52	Kosmos-3M 11K65M	Communication	in orbit	
Kosmos 1565	Strela-1M	28 May 1984; 21:52	Kosmos-3M 11K65M	Communication	in orbit	
Kosmos 1566	Strela-1M	28 May 1984; 21:52	Kosmos-3M 11K65M	Communication	in orbit	
Kosmos 1567	US-P	30 May 1984; 18:46	Tsyklon-2 11K69	ELINT	3 April 1988	
Kosmos 1568	Zenit-6	1 June 1984; 13:50	Soyuz-U 11A511U	Reconnaissance	14 June 1984	
Kosmos 1569	US-K	6 June 1984; 15:34	Molniya-M 8K78M	Missile defence	7 May 2001	
Kosmos 1570	Strela-2	8 June 1984; 11:28	Kosmos-3M 11K65M	Communication	in orbit	
Kosmos 1571	Zenit-8	11 June 1984; 08:40	Soyuz-U 11A511U	Reconnaissance	26 June 1984	
Kosmos 1572	Resurs-F1	15 June 1984; 08:20	Soyuz-U 11A511U	Remote sensing	29 June 1984	
Kosmos 1573	Zenit-6	19 June 1984; 10:55	Soyuz-U 11A511U	Reconnaissance	28 June 1984	
Kosmos 1574	Nadezhda	21 June 1984; 19:40	Kosmos-3M 11K65M	Navigation, Technology	in orbit	
Kosmos 1575	Resurs-F1	22 June 1984; 07:40	Soyuz-U 11A511U	Remote sensing	7 July 1984	
Kosmos 1576	Yantar-4K2	26 June 1984; 15:35	Soyuz-U 11A511U	Reconnaissance	24 August 1984	
Kosmos 1577	Parus	27 June 1984; 04:59	Kosmos-3M 11K65M	Navigation, Communication	in orbit	
Kosmos 1578	Taifun-1B	28 June 1984; 13:10	Kosmos-3M 11K65M	Radar target	10 January 1993	
Kosmos 1579	US-A	29 June 1984; 00:21	Tsyklon-2 11K69	Reconnaissance	5 November 1984	
Kosmos 1580	Zenit-8	29 June 1984; 15:00	Soyuz-U 11A511U	Reconnaissance	13 July 1984	
Kosmos 1581	US-K	3 July 1984; 21:31	Molniya-M 8K78M	Missile defence	in orbit	
Kosmos 1582	Resurs-F1	19 July 1984; 08:30	Soyuz-U 11A511U	Remote sensing	2 August 1984	
Kosmos 1583	Zenit-8	24 July 1984; 12:40	Soyuz-U 11A511U	Reconnaissance	8 August 1984	
Kosmos 1584	Zenit-8	27 July 1984; 08:59	Soyuz-U 11A511U	Reconnaissance	10 August 1984	
Kosmos 1585	Yantar-4K2	31 July 1984; 12:29	Soyuz-U 11A511U	Reconnaissance	28 September 1984	
Kosmos 1586	US-K	2 August 1984; 08:38	Molniya-M 8K78M	Missile defence	in orbit	
Kosmos 1587	Zenit-8	6 August 1984; 14:00	Soyuz-U 11A511U	Reconnaissance	31 August 1984	
Kosmos 1588	US-P	7 August 1984; 22:50	Tsyklon-2 11K69	ELINT	17 February 1988	
Kosmos 1589	Geo-IK	8 August 1984; 12:08	Tsyklon-3 11K68	Geodesy	in orbit	Fourth satellite in the upgraded second series of Soviet geodetic satellites. Carried out study of the shape of the Earth and accurately mapped the Earth's surface to enable accurate targeting of military missiles.
Kosmos 1590	Resurs-F1	16 August 1984; 09:50	Soyuz-U 11A511U	Remote sensing	30 August 1984	
Kosmos 1591	Resurs-F1	30 August 1984; 10:10	Soyuz-U 11A511U	Remote sensing	13 September 1984	
Kosmos 1592	Zenit-8	4 September 1984; 10:20	Soyuz-U 11A511U	Reconnaissance	18 September 1984	
Kosmos 1593	Glonass	4 September 1984; 15:49	Proton-K/DM-2 8K72K	Navigation	in orbit	
Kosmos 1594	Glonass	4 September 1984; 15:49	Proton-K/DM-2 8K72K	Navigation	in orbit	
Kosmos 1595	Glonass	4 September 1984; 15:49	Proton-K/DM-2 8K72K	Navigation	in orbit	
Kosmos 1596	US-K	7 September 1984; 19:13	Molniya-M 8K78M	Missile defence	in orbit	
Kosmos 1597	Zenit-4MKT	13 September 1984; 10:25	Soyuz-U 11A511U	Reconnaissance	26 September 1984	
Kosmos 1598	Parus	13 September 1984; 15:54	Kosmos-3M 11K65M	Navigation, Communication	in orbit	
Kosmos 1599	Yantar-4K2	25 September 1984; 14:30	Soyuz-U 11A511U	Reconnaissance	20 November 1984	
Kosmos 1600	Zenit-8	27 September 1984; 08:10	Soyuz-U 11A511U	Reconnaissance	11 October 1984	
Kosmos 1601	Romb	27 September 1984; 09:30	Kosmos-3M 11K65M	Calibration	29 November 1989	
Kosmos 1602	Okean-OE	28 September 1984; 06:00	Tsyklon-3 11K68	Oceanography	in orbit	
Kosmos 1603	Tselina-2	28 September 1984; 14:00	Proton-K/DM-2 8K72K	ELINT	in orbit	
Kosmos 1604	US-K	4 October 1984; 19:49	Molniya-M 8K78M	Missile defence	in orbit	
Kosmos 1605	Parus	11 October 1984; 14:43	Kosmos-3M 11K65M	Navigation, Communication	in orbit	
Kosmos 1606	Tselina-D	18 October 1984; 17:46	Tsyklon-3 11K68	ELINT	in orbit	
Kosmos 1607	US-A	31 October 1984; 12:29	Tsyklon-2 11K69	Reconnaissance	28 March 1985	
Kosmos 1608	Yantar-1KFT	14 November 1984; 07:40	Soyuz-U 11A511U	Reconnaissance	17 December 1984	
Kosmos 1609	Zenit-8	14 November 1984; 12:20	Soyuz-U 11A511U	Reconnaissance	28 November 1984	
Kosmos 1610	Parus	15 November 1984; 06:40	Kosmos-3M 11K65M	Navigation, Communication	in orbit	
Kosmos 1611	Yantar-4K2	21 November 1984; 10:30	Soyuz-U 11A511U	Reconnaissance	11 January 1985	
Kosmos 1612	Meteor-3	27 November 1984; 14:12	Tsyklon-3 11K68	Weather	31 January 1985	Satellite left stranded in an unusable orbit following the failure of the rocket upper stage to reignite, causing a Kosmos number to be assigned.
Kosmos 1613	Zenit-8	29 November 1984; 14:00	Soyuz-U 11A511U	Reconnaissance	24 December 1984	
Kosmos 1614	BOR-4	19 December 1984; 03:55	Kosmos-3MRB 11K65M-RB	Test of spaceplane.	19 December 1984	Launched from Kapustin Yar. Orbit 176 x 223 km. Inclination 50.7 degrees. Mass-possibly 1 tonne. Recovered in Black Sea after 1 orbit. Last (fourth) orbital test of the BOR-4 prototype spaceplane.
Kosmos 1615	Taifun-1B	20 December 1984; 13:00	Kosmos-3M 11K65M	Radar target	15 April 1990	
Kosmos 1616	Yantar-4K2	9 January 1985; 10:45	Soyuz-U 11A511U	Reconnaissance	4 March 1985	
Kosmos 1617	Strela-3	15 January 1985; 14:50	Tsyklon-3 11K68	Communication	in orbit	
Kosmos 1618	Strela-3	15 January 1985; 14:50	Tsyklon-3 11K68	Communication	in orbit	
Kosmos 1619	Strela-3	15 January 1985; 14:50	Tsyklon-3 11K68	Communication	in orbit	
Kosmos 1620	Strela-3	15 January 1985; 14:50	Tsyklon-3 11K68	Communication	in orbit	
Kosmos 1621	Strela-3	15 January 1985; 14:50	Tsyklon-3 11K68	Communication	in orbit	
Kosmos 1622	Strela-3	15 January 1985; 14:50	Tsyklon-3 11K68	Communication	in orbit	
Kosmos 1623	Zenit-8	16 January 1985; 08:19	Soyuz-U 11A511U	Reconnaissance	30 January 1985	
Kosmos 1624	Strela-2	17 January 1985; 17:46	Kosmos-3M 11K65M	Communication	in orbit	
Kosmos 1625	US-P	23 January 1985; 19:58	Tsyklon-2 11K69	ELINT	25 January 1985	
Kosmos 1626	Tselina-D	24 January 1985; 16:45	Tsyklon-3 11K68	ELINT	in orbit	
Kosmos 1627	Parus	1 February 1985; 19:36	Kosmos-3M 11K65M	Navigation, Communication	in orbit	
Kosmos 1628	Zenit-8	6 February 1985; 11:00	Soyuz-U 11A511U	Reconnaissance	20 February 1985	
Kosmos 1629	US-KS	21 February 1985; 07:57	Proton-K/DM 8K72K	Missile defence	in orbit	
Kosmos 1630	Yantar-4K2	27 February 1985; 11:10	Soyuz-U 11A511U	Reconnaissance	23 April 1985	
Kosmos 1631	Taifun-1	27 February 1985; 12:56	Kosmos-3M 11K65M	Radar target	8 December 1990	
Kosmos 1632	Zenit-8	1 March 1985; 10:40	Soyuz-U 11A511U	Reconnaissance	15 March 1985	
Kosmos 1633	Tselina-D	5 March 1985; 15:39	Tsyklon-3 11K68	ELINT	in orbit	
Kosmos 1634	Parus	14 March 1985; 01:09	Kosmos-3M 11K65M	Navigation, Communication	in orbit	
Kosmos 1635	Strela-1M	21 March 1985; 00:08	Kosmos-3M 11K65M	Communication	in orbit	
Kosmos 1636	Strela-1M	21 March 1985; 00:08	Kosmos-3M 11K65M	Communication	in orbit	
Kosmos 1637	Strela-1M	21 March 1985; 00:08	Kosmos-3M 11K65M	Communication	in orbit	
Kosmos 1638	Strela-1M	21 March 1985; 00:08	Kosmos-3M 11K65M	Communication	in orbit	
Kosmos 1639	Strela-1M	21 March 1985; 00:08	Kosmos-3M 11K65M	Communication	in orbit	
Kosmos 1640	Strela-1M	21 March 1985; 00:08	Kosmos-3M 11K65M	Communication	in orbit	
Kosmos 1641	Strela-1M	21 March 1985; 00:08	Kosmos-3M 11K65M	Communication	in orbit	
Kosmos 1642	Strela-1M	21 March 1985; 00:08	Kosmos-3M 11K65M	Communication	in orbit	
Kosmos 1643	Yantar-4KS1	25 March 1985; 10:00	Soyuz-U 11A511U	Reconnaissance	18 October 1985	
Kosmos 1644	Zenit-8	3 April 1985; 08:40	Soyuz-U 11A511U	Reconnaissance	17 April 1985	
Kosmos 1645	Foton	16 April 1985; 17:15	Soyuz-U 11A511U	Materials research experiments.	29 April 1985	Plesetsk launch. Orbit 215 x 390 km. Inclination 63 degrees. Mass-possibly 6500 kg. Recovered after 13 days.
Kosmos 1646	US-P	18 April 1985; 21:40	Tsyklon-2 11K69	ELINT	12 May 1988	
Kosmos 1647	Yantar-4K2	19 April 1985; 14:00	Soyuz-U 11A511U	Reconnaissance	11 June 1985	
Kosmos 1648	Zenit-8	25 April 1985; 09:30	Soyuz-U 11A511U	Reconnaissance	6 May 1985	
Kosmos 1649	Zenit-8	15 May 1985; 12:40	Soyuz-U 11A511U	Reconnaissance	29 May 1985	
Kosmos 1650	Glonass	17 May 1985; 22:28	Proton-K/DM-2 8K72K	Navigation	in orbit	
Kosmos 1651	Glonass	17 May 1985; 22:28	Proton-K/DM-2 8K72K	Navigation	in orbit	
Kosmos 1652	Glonass	17 May 1985; 22:28	Proton-K/DM-2 8K72K	Navigation	in orbit	
Kosmos 1653	Resurs-F1	22 May 1985; 08:35	Soyuz-U 11A511U	Remote sensing	5 June 1985	
Kosmos 1654	Yantar-4K2	23 May 1985; 12:40	Soyuz-U 11A511U	Reconnaissance	7 August 1985	
Kosmos 1655	Tsikada	30 May 1985; 01:14	Kosmos-3M 11K65M	Navigation	in orbit	
Kosmos 1656	Tselina-2	30 May 1985; 14:59	Proton-K/DM-2 8K72K	ELINT	in orbit	
Kosmos 1657	Resurs-F1	7 June 1985; 07:45	Soyuz-U 11A511U	Remote sensing	21 June 1985	
Kosmos 1658	US-K	11 June 1985; 14:27	Molniya-M 8K78M	Missile defence	12 November 2005	
Kosmos 1659	Zenit-8	13 June 1985; 12:20	Soyuz-U 11A511U	Reconnaissance	27 June 1985	
Kosmos 1660	Geo-IK	14 June 1985; 10:36	Tsyklon-3 11K68	Geodesy	in orbit	Fifth satellite in the upgraded second series of Soviet geodetic satellites. Carried out study of the shape of the Earth and accurately mapped the Earth's surface to enable accurate targeting of military missiles.
Kosmos 1661	US-K	18 June 1985; 00:40	Molniya-M 8K78M	Missile defence	in orbit	
Kosmos 1662	Romb	19 June 1985; 11:30	Kosmos-3M 11K65M	Calibration	16 November 1989	
Kosmos 1663	Resurs-F1	21 June 1985; 07:45	Soyuz-U 11A511U	Remote sensing	5 July 1985	
Kosmos 1664	Zenit-8	26 June 1985; 12:35	Soyuz-U 11A511U	Reconnaissance	5 July 1985	
Kosmos 1665	Zenit-8	3 July 1985; 12:10	Soyuz-U 11A511U	Reconnaissance	17 July 1985	
Kosmos 1666	Tselina-D	8 July 1985; 23:40	Tsyklon-3 11K68	ELINT	in orbit	
Kosmos 1667	Bion	10 July 1985; 03:15	Soyuz-U 11A511U	International Biosatellite carrying monkeys, plants, rats, insects and fish.	17 July 1985	Plesetsk launch. Orbit 211 x 270 km. Inclination 82.4 degrees. Mass-possibly 6500 kg. Recovered after 7 days.
Kosmos 1668	Zenit-8	15 July 1985; 06:30	Soyuz-U 11A511U	Reconnaissance	29 July 1985	
Kosmos 1669	Progress 7K-TG	19 July 1985; 13:05	Soyuz-U 11A511U	Modified Progress resupply vehicle.	30 August 1985	Baikonur launch. Orbit 354 x 357 km. Inclination 52 degrees. Mass-possibly 7 tonnes. Docked with Salyut 7 from 21 July to 28 August 1985.
Kosmos 1670	US-A	1 August 1985; 05:36	Tsyklon-2 11K69	Reconnaissance	8 December 1985	
Kosmos 1671	Zenit-8	2 August 1985; 11:40	Soyuz-U 11A511U	Reconnaissance	16 August 1985	
Kosmos 1672	Resurs-F1	7 August 1985; 09:50	Soyuz-U 11A511U	Remote sensing	21 August 1985	
Kosmos 1673	Yantar-1KFT	8 August 1985; 10:19	Soyuz-U 11A511U	Reconnaissance	19 September 1985	
Kosmos 1674	Tselina-D	8 August 1985; 11:49	Tsyklon-3 11K68	ELINT	in orbit	
Kosmos 1675	US-K	12 August 1985; 15:09	Molniya-M 8K78M	Missile defence	in orbit	
Kosmos 1676	Yantar-4K2	16 August 1985; 15:10	Soyuz-U 11A511U	Reconnaissance	14 October 1985	
Kosmos 1677	US-A	23 August 1985; 22:33	Tsyklon-2 11K69	Reconnaissance	14 December 1985	
Kosmos 1678	Resurs-F1	29 August 1985; 10:15	Soyuz-U 11A511U	Remote sensing	12 September 1985	
Kosmos 1679	Yantar-4K2	29 August 1985; 11:33	Soyuz-U 11A511U	Reconnaissance	18 October 1985	
Kosmos 1680	Strela-2	4 September 1985; 07:05	Kosmos-3M 11K65M	Communication	in orbit	
Kosmos 1681	Zenit-4MKT	6 September 1985; 10:45	Soyuz-U 11A511U	Reconnaissance	19 September 1985	
Kosmos 1682	US-P	19 September 1985; 01:32	Tsyklon-2 11K69	ELINT	17 May 1988	
Kosmos 1683	Zenit-8	19 September 1985; 10:10	Soyuz-U 11A511U	Reconnaissance	4 October 1985	
Kosmos 1684	US-K	24 September 1985; 01:18	Molniya-M 8K78M	Missile defence	in orbit	
Kosmos 1685	Zenit-8	26 September 1985; 11:15	Soyuz-U 11A511U	Reconnaissance	10 October 1985	
Kosmos 1686	TKS-M	27 September 1985; 08:41	Proton-K 8K72K	Specialized Space Station module. Carrying food, water, scientific instruments, propellants. Improved Salyut 7 power generation capability.	7 February 1991	Baikonur launch. Orbit 335 x 351 km. Inclination 52 degrees. Mass 20 tonnes. Docked with Salyut 7 on 2 October 1985.
Kosmos 1687	US-K	30 September 1985; 19:23	Molniya-M 8K78M	Missile defence	in orbit	
Kosmos 1688	Romb	2 October 1985; 06:00	Kosmos-3M 11K65M	Calibration	2 July 1988	
Kosmos 1689	Resurs-O1	3 October 1985; 05:48	Vostok-2M 8A92M	Experimental natural resources satellite. Similar to Cosmos 1484.	14 January 2001	Baikonur launch. Orbit 572 x 657 km. Inclination 98 degrees.
Kosmos 1690	Strela-3	9 October 1985; 21:35	Tsyklon-3 11K68	Communication	in orbit	
Kosmos 1691	Strela-3	9 October 1985; 21:35	Tsyklon-3 11K68	Communication	in orbit	Disintegrated in orbit due to a failure of an NiH2 battery.
Kosmos 1692	Strela-3	9 October 1985; 21:35	Tsyklon-3 11K68	Communication	in orbit	
Kosmos 1693	Strela-3	9 October 1985; 21:35	Tsyklon-3 11K68	Communication	in orbit	
Kosmos 1694	Strela-3	9 October 1985; 21:35	Tsyklon-3 11K68	Communication	in orbit	
Kosmos 1695	Strela-3	9 October 1985; 21:35	Tsyklon-3 11K68	Communication	in orbit	
Kosmos 1696	Zenit-8	16 October 1985; 09:25	Soyuz-U 11A511U	Reconnaissance	30 October 1985	
Kosmos 1697	Tselina-2	22 October 1985; 07:00	Zenit-2 11K77	ELINT	in orbit	Baikonur launch. Orbit 850 x 854 km. Inclination 71 degrees. First orbital flight from the SL-X-16 (US Department of Defense nomenclature) rocket.
Kosmos 1698	US-K	22 October 1985; 20:24	Molniya-M 8K78M	Missile defence	in orbit	
Kosmos 1699	Yantar-4K2	25 October 1985; 14:40	Soyuz-U 11A511U	Reconnaissance	23 December 1985	
Kosmos 1700	Luch	25 October 1985; 15:45	Proton-K/DM-2 8K72K	Communication	in orbit	
Kosmos 1701	US-K	9 November 1985; 08:25	Molniya-M 8K78M	Missile defence	11 May 2001	
Kosmos 1702	Zenit-8	13 November 1985; 12:25	Soyuz-U 11A511U	Reconnaissance	27 November 1985	
Kosmos 1703	Tselina-D	22 November 1985; 22:20	Tsyklon-3 11K68	ELINT	in orbit	
Kosmos 1704	Parus	28 November 1985; 13:12	Kosmos-3M 11K65M	Navigation, Communication	in orbit	
Kosmos 1705	Zenit-8	3 December 1985; 12:15	Soyuz-U 11A511U	Reconnaissance	17 December 1985	
Kosmos 1706	Yantar-4K2	11 December 1985; 14:40	Soyuz-U 11A511U	Reconnaissance	9 February 1986	
Kosmos 1707	Tselina-D	12 December 1985; 15:51	Tsyklon-3 11K68	ELINT	in orbit	
Kosmos 1708	Resurs-F1	13 December 1985; 07:45	Soyuz-U 11A511U	Remote sensing	27 December 1985	
Kosmos 1709	Parus	19 December 1985; 08:46	Kosmos-3M 11K65M	Navigation, Communication	in orbit	
Kosmos 1710	Glonass	24 December 1985; 21:43	Proton-K/DM-2 8K72K	Navigation	in orbit	
Kosmos 1711	Glonass	24 December 1985; 21:43	Proton-K/DM-2 8K72K	Navigation	in orbit	
Kosmos 1712	Glonass	24 December 1985; 21:43	Proton-K/DM-2 8K72K	Navigation	in orbit	
Kosmos 1713	Efir	27 December 1985; 17:06	Soyuz-U 11A511U	Magnetospheric	22 January 1986	
Kosmos 1714	Tselina-2	28 December 1985; 09:16	Zenit-2 11K77	ELINT	in orbit	
Kosmos 1715	Zenit-8	8 January 1986; 11:25	Soyuz-U 11A511U	Reconnaissance	22 January 1986	
Kosmos 1716	Strela-1M	9 January 1986; 02:48	Kosmos-3M 11K65M	Communication	in orbit	
Kosmos 1717	Strela-1M	9 January 1986; 02:48	Kosmos-3M 11K65M	Communication	in orbit	
Kosmos 1718	Strela-1M	9 January 1986; 02:48	Kosmos-3M 11K65M	Communication	in orbit	
Kosmos 1719	Strela-1M	9 January 1986; 02:48	Kosmos-3M 11K65M	Communication	in orbit	
Kosmos 1720	Strela-1M	9 January 1986; 02:48	Kosmos-3M 11K65M	Communication	in orbit	
Kosmos 1721	Strela-1M	9 January 1986; 02:48	Kosmos-3M 11K65M	Communication	in orbit	
Kosmos 1722	Strela-1M	9 January 1986; 02:48	Kosmos-3M 11K65M	Communication	in orbit	
Kosmos 1723	Strela-1M	9 January 1986; 02:48	Kosmos-3M 11K65M	Communication	in orbit	
Kosmos 1724	Yantar-4K2	15 January 1986; 14:20	Soyuz-U 11A511U	Reconnaissance	15 March 1986	
Kosmos 1725	Parus	16 January 1986; 11:38	Kosmos-3M 11K65M	Navigation, Communication	in orbit	
Kosmos 1726	Tselina-D	17 January 1986; 07:21	Tsyklon-3 11K68	ELINT	in orbit	
Kosmos 1727	Tsikada	23 January 1986; 18:52	Kosmos-3M 11K65M	Navigation	in orbit	
Kosmos 1728	Zenit-8	28 January 1986; 08:35	Soyuz-U 11A511U	Reconnaissance	11 February 1986	
Kosmos 1729	US-K	1 February 1986; 18:11	Molniya-M 8K78M	Missile defence	in orbit	
Kosmos 1730	Zenit-8	4 February 1986; 11:15	Soyuz-U 11A511U	Reconnaissance	13 February 1986	
Kosmos 1731	Yantar-4KS1	7 February 1986; 08:45	Soyuz-U 11A511U	Reconnaissance	3 October 1986	
Kosmos 1732	Geo-IK	11 February 1986; 06:56	Tsyklon-3 11K68	Geodesy	in orbit	Sixth satellite in the upgraded second series of Soviet geodetic satellites. Carried out study of the shape of the Earth and accurately mapped the Earth's surface to enable accurate targeting of military missiles.
Kosmos 1733	Tselina-D	19 February 1986; 23:04	Tsyklon-3 11K68	ELINT	in orbit	
Kosmos 1734	Yantar-4K2	26 February 1986; 13:40	Soyuz-U 11A511U	Reconnaissance	26 April 1986	
Kosmos 1735	US-PM	27 February 1986; 01:44	Tsyklon-2 11K69	Reconnaissance	17 November 1988	
Kosmos 1736	US-A	21 March 1986; 10:05	Tsyklon-2 11K69	Reconnaissance	1 September 1986	
Kosmos 1737	US-PM	25 March 1986; 19:26	Tsyklon-2 11K69	New higher inclination EORSAT. Built to extend coverage further into polar region.	3 December 1986	Baikonur launch. Orbit 413 x 428 km. Inclination 73.4 degrees. Mass-possibly 3500 kg.
Kosmos 1738	Potok	4 April 1986; 03:45	Proton-K/DM 8K72K	Communication	in orbit	
Kosmos 1739	Yantar-4K2	9 April 1986; 08:00	Soyuz-U 11A511U	Reconnaissance	7 June 1986	
Kosmos 1740	Zenit-8	15 April 1986; 11:40	Soyuz-U 11A511U	Reconnaissance	28 April 1986	
Kosmos 1741	Strela-2	17 April 1986; 21:02	Kosmos-3M 11K65M	Communication	in orbit	
Kosmos 1742	Zenit-8	14 May 1986; 12:40	Soyuz-U 11A511U	Reconnaissance	28 May 1986	
Kosmos 1743	Tselina-D	15 May 1986; 04:26	Tsyklon-3 11K68	ELINT	in orbit	
Kosmos 1744	Foton	21 May 1986; 16:30	Soyuz-U 11A511U	Continued on from Kosmos 1645. Continuation of research in materials study.	4 June 1986	Plesetsk launch. Orbit 219 x 372 km. Inclination 63 degrees. Recovered after 13 days in orbit.
Kosmos 1745	Parus	23 May 1986; 12:54	Kosmos-3M 11K65M	Navigation, Communication	in orbit	
Kosmos 1746	Resurs-F1	28 May 1986; 07:50	Soyuz-U 11A511U	Remote sensing	12 June 1986	
Kosmos 1747	Zenit-8	29 May 1986; 09:20	Soyuz-U 11A511U	Reconnaissance	12 June 1986	
Kosmos 1748	Strela-1M	6 June 1986; 03:57	Kosmos-3M 11K65M	Communication	in orbit	Launched with Kosmos 1751-1755
Kosmos 1749	Strela-1M	6 June 1986; 03:57	Kosmos-3M 11K65M	Communication	in orbit	Launched with Kosmos 1751-1755
Kosmos 1750	Strela-1M	6 June 1986; 03:57	Kosmos-3M 11K65M	Communication	in orbit	Launched with Kosmos 1751-1755

* — satellite was destroyed in orbit rather than decaying and burning up in the Earth's atmosphere

== See also ==
- List of USA satellites
