= Kosmos 2422 =

Russian military satellite

- Mission type: Early warning
- COSPAR ID: 2006-030A
- SATCAT no.: 29260
- Mission duration: 4 years

Spacecraft properties
- Spacecraft type: US-K
- Launch mass: 1,900 kilograms (4,200 lb)

Start of mission
- Launch date: 21 July 2006, 04:20 UTC
- Rocket: Molniya-M/2BL
- Launch site: Plesetsk Cosmodrome

End of mission
- Decay date: 22 November 2019, 22:15 UTC

Orbital parameters
- Reference system: Geocentric
- Regime: Molniya
- Perigee altitude: 583 kilometres (362 mi)
- Apogee altitude: 39,780 kilometres (24,720 mi)
- Inclination: 62.9 degrees
- Period: 717.96 minutes

Kosmos 2422 (Russian: Космос 2422 meaning Cosmos 2422) was a Russian US-K missile early warning satellite which was launched in 2006 as part of the Russian Space Forces' Oko programme. The satellite was designed to identify missile launches using optical telescopes and infrared sensors.

Kosmos 2422 was launched from Site 16/2 at Plesetsk Cosmodrome in Russia. A Molniya-M carrier rocket with a 2BL upper stage was used to perform the launch, which took place at 04:20 UTC on 21 July 2006. The launch successfully placed the satellite into a molniya orbit. It subsequently received its Kosmos designation, and the international designator 2006-030A. The United States Space Command assigned it the Satellite Catalog Number 29260.

Kosmos 2422 decayed from orbit on 22 November 2019, at 22:15 UTC.

== See also ==
- List of Kosmos satellites (2251–2500)
- List of R-7 launches (2005–2009)
- 2006 in spaceflight
- List of Oko satellites
