= Kosmos 1629 =

Soviet military early warning satellite

- Mission type: Early warning
- Operator: VKS
- COSPAR ID: 1985-016A
- SATCAT no.: 15574
- Mission duration: 2 years

Spacecraft properties
- Spacecraft type: US-KS (74Kh6)
- Manufacturer: Lavochkin
- Launch mass: 2,400 kilograms (5,300 lb)

Start of mission
- Launch date: 21 February 1985, 07:57:00 UTC
- Rocket: Proton-K/DM
- Launch site: Baikonur 200/39

End of mission
- Deactivated: 16 January 1987

Orbital parameters
- Reference system: Geocentric
- Regime: Geostationary

Instruments
- Optical telescope with 50 centimetres (20 in) aperture Infrared sensor/s Smaller telescopes

Kosmos 1629 (Russian: Космос 1629 meaning Cosmos 1629) is a Soviet US-KS missile early warning satellite which was launched in 1985 as part of the Oko programme. The satellite is designed to identify missile launches using optical telescopes and infrared sensors.

Kosmos 1629 was launched from Site 200/39 at Baikonur Cosmodrome in the Kazakh SSR. A Proton-K carrier rocket with a DM upper stage was used to perform the launch, which took place at 07:57 UTC on 21 February 1985. The launch successfully placed the satellite into geostationary orbit. It subsequently received its Kosmos designation, and the international designator 1985-016A. The United States Space Command assigned it the Satellite Catalog Number 15574.

It was operational for about 2 years.

== See also ==
- List of Kosmos satellites (1501–1750)
