= Kosmos 1546 =

Soviet military early warning satellite

- Mission type: Early warning
- Operator: VKS
- COSPAR ID: 1984-031A
- SATCAT no.: 14867
- Mission duration: 18 months

Spacecraft properties
- Spacecraft type: US-KS (74Kh6)
- Manufacturer: Lavochkin
- Launch mass: 2,400 kilograms (5,300 lb)

Start of mission
- Launch date: 29 March 1984, 05:53:00 UTC
- Rocket: Proton-K/DM
- Launch site: Baikonur 200/40

End of mission
- Deactivated: 16 November 1986

Orbital parameters
- Reference system: Geocentric
- Regime: Geostationary

Instruments
- Optical telescope with 50 centimetres (20 in) aperture Infrared sensor/s Smaller telescopes

Kosmos 1546 (Russian: Космос 1546 meaning Cosmos 1546) is a Soviet US-KS missile early warning satellite which was launched in 1984 as part of the Oko programme. The satellite is designed to identify missile launches using optical telescopes and infrared sensors.

Kosmos 1546 was launched from Site 200/40 at Baikonur Cosmodrome in the Kazakh SSR. A Proton-K carrier rocket with a DM upper stage was used to perform the launch, which took place at 05:53 UTC on 29 March 1984. The launch successfully placed the satellite into geostationary orbit. It subsequently received its Kosmos designation, and the international designator 1984-031A. The United States Space Command assigned it the Satellite Catalog Number 14867.

It was operational for about 30 months.

== See also ==
- List of Kosmos satellites (1501–1750)
