= List of R-7 launches (1980–1984) =

This is a list of launches made by the R-7 Semyorka ICBM, and its derivatives between 1980 and 1984. All launches are orbital satellite launches, unless stated otherwise.

Date and time (GMT)	Configuration	Serial number	Launch site	Result	Payload	Remarks
== 1980 ==
9 January 1980, 12:15	Soyuz-U (11A511U)		LC-43/3, Plesetsk	Successful	Kosmos 1149 (Zenit-6)	
11 January 1980, 12:28	Molniya-M (8K78M)		LC-41/1, Plesetsk	Successful	Molniya 1-46	
24 January 1980, 15:45	Soyuz-U (11A511U)		LC-43/3, Plesetsk	Successful	Kosmos 1152 (Yantar-2K)	
30 January 1980, 12:51	Vostok-2M (8A92M)		LC-43/4, Plesetsk	Successful	Kosmos 1154 (Tselina-D)	
7 February 1980, 11:00	Soyuz-U (11A511U)		LC-43/4, Plesetsk	Successful	Kosmos 1155 (Zenit-6)	
12 February 1980, 00:53	Molniya-M (8K78M)		LC-43/4, Plesetsk	Partial failure	Kosmos 1164 (Oko)	Blok L could not be started due to failure of an orientation sensor
21 February 1980, 12:00	Soyuz-U (11A511U)		LC-43/4, Plesetsk	Successful	Kosmos 1165 (Zenit-4MKM)	
4 March 1980, 10:30	Soyuz-U (11A511U)		LC-43/4, Plesetsk	Successful	Kosmos 1166 (Zenit-6)	
18 March 1980, 16:01	Vostok-2M (8A92M)		LC-43/4, Plesetsk	Failure	Tselina-D	Vehicle exploded on pad during servicing due to hydrogen peroxide decomposition, killing 48 people.
27 March 1980, 18:53	Soyuz-U (11A511U)		LC-31/6, Baikonur	Successful	Progress 8	Salyut 6 Logistics
1 April 1980, 08:00	Soyuz-U (11A511U)		LC-31/6, Baikonur	Successful	Kosmos 1170 (Zenit-4MKM)	
9 April 1980, 13:38	Soyuz-U (11A511U)		LC-31/6, Baikonur	Successful	Soyuz 35	Crewed orbital flight, 2 cosmonauts Docked with Salyut 6
12 April 1980, 20:18	Molniya-M (8K78M)		LC-41/1, Plesetsk	Successful	Kosmos 1172 (Oko)	
17 April 1980, 08:30	Soyuz-U (11A511U)		LC-31/6, Baikonur	Successful	Kosmos 1173 (Zenit-4MKM)	
18 April 1980, 17:31	Molniya-M (8K78M)		LC-41/1, Plesetsk	Partial Failure	Kosmos 1175 (Molniya 3-26L)	Blok L stage failed to ignite due to stuck LOX valve
27 April 1980, 06:24	Soyuz-U (11A511U)		LC-1/5, Baikonur	Successful	Progress 9	Salyut 6 Logistics
29 April 1980, 13:30	Soyuz-U (11A511U)		LC-43/3, Plesetsk	Successful	Kosmos 1177 (Yantar-4K1)	
7 May 1980, 13:00	Soyuz-U (11A511U)		LC-41/1, Plesetsk	Successful	Kosmos 1178 (Zenit-6)	
15 May 1980, 05:35	Soyuz-U (11A511U)		LC-43/3, Plesetsk	Successful	Kosmos 1180 (Zenit-4MT)	
23 May 1980, 07:10	Soyuz-U (11A511U)		LC-43/3, Plesetsk	Successful	Kosmos 1182 (Zenit-4MKT)	
26 May 1980, 18:20	Soyuz-U (11A511U)		LC-31/6, Baikonur	Successful	Soyuz 36	Crewed orbital flight, 2 cosmonauts Docked with Salyut 6
28 May 1980, 12:00	Soyuz-U (11A511U)		LC-41/1, Plesetsk	Successful	Kosmos 1183 (Zenit-6)	
4 June 1980, 07:34	Vostok-2M (8A92M)		LC-43/3, Plesetsk	Successful	Kosmos 1184 (Tselina-D)	
5 June 1980, 14:19	Soyuz-U (11A511U)		LC-1/5, Baikonur	Successful	Soyuz T-2	Crewed orbital flight, 2 cosmonauts Docked with Salyut 6
6 June 1980, 07:00	Soyuz-U (11A511U)		LC-41/1, Plesetsk	Successful	Kosmos 1185 (Resurs-F1)	
12 June 1980, 12:30	Soyuz-U (11A511U)		LC-41/1, Plesetsk	Successful	Kosmos 1187 (Zenit-6)	
14 June 1980, 20:52	Molniya-M (8K78M)		LC-43/3, Plesetsk	Successful	Kosmos 1188 (Oko)	
18 June 1980, 06:14	Vostok-2M (8A92M)		LC-31/6, Baikonur	Successful	Meteor 1-30 (Meteor-Priroda 5)	
21 June 1980, 18:34	Molniya-M (8K78M)		LC-41/1, Plesetsk	Successful	Molniya 1-47	
26 June 1980, 12:20	Soyuz-U (11A511U)		LC-41/1, Plesetsk	Successful	Kosmos 1189 (Zenit-6)	
29 June 1980, 04:41	Soyuz-U (11A511U)		LC-1/5, Baikonur	Successful	Progress 10	Salyut 6 Logistics
2 July 1980, 00:54	Molniya-M (8K78M)		LC-41/1, Plesetsk	Successful	Kosmos 1191 (Oko)	
9 July 1980, 12:40	Soyuz-U (11A511U)		LC-41/1, Plesetsk	Successful	Kosmos 1200 (Zenit-6)	
15 July 1980, 07:30	Soyuz-U (11A511U)		LC-43/3, Plesetsk	Successful	Kosmos 1201 (Zenit-4MKT)	
18 July 1980, 10:37	Molniya-M (8K78M)		LC-43/3, Plesetsk	Successful	Molniya 3-27L	
23 July 1980, 18:33	Soyuz-U (11A511U)		LC-1/5, Baikonur	Successful	Soyuz 37	Crewed orbital flight, 2 cosmonauts Docked with Salyut 6
24 July 1980, 12:40	Soyuz-U (11A511U)		LC-43/3, Plesetsk	Successful	Kosmos 1202 (Zenit-6)	
31 July 1980, 07:45	Soyuz-U (11A511U)		LC-43/3, Plesetsk	Successful	Kosmos 1203 (Resurs-F1)	
12 August 1980, 11:50	Soyuz-U (11A511U)		LC-43/3, Plesetsk	Successful	Kosmos 1205 (Zenit-6)	
15 August 1980, 05:34	Vostok-2M (8A92M)		LC-43/3, Plesetsk	Successful	Kosmos 1206 (Tselina-D)	
22 August 1980, 10:00	Soyuz-U (11A511U)		LC-41/1, Plesetsk	Successful	Kosmos 1207 (Zenit-4MKT)	
26 August 1980, 15:30	Soyuz-U (11A511U)		LC-41/1, Plesetsk	Successful	Kosmos 1208 (Yantar-2K)	
3 September 1980, 10:20	Soyuz-U (11A511U)		LC-41/1, Plesetsk	Successful	Kosmos 1209 (Resurs-F1)	
9 September 1980, 11:00	Vostok-2M (8A92M)		LC-43/3, Plesetsk	Successful	Meteor 2-6	
18 September 1980, 19:11	Soyuz-U (11A511U)		LC-1/5, Baikonur	Successful	Soyuz 38	Crewed orbital flight, 2 cosmonauts Docked with Salyut 6
19 September 1980, 10:10	Soyuz-U (11A511U)		LC-41/1, Plesetsk	Successful	Kosmos 1210 (Zenit-6)	
23 September 1980, 10:30	Soyuz-U (11A511U)		LC-41/1, Plesetsk	Successful	Kosmos 1211 (Zenit-4MT)	
26 September 1980, 10:10	Soyuz-U (11A511U)		LC-41/1, Plesetsk	Successful	Kosmos 1212 (Zenit-4MKT)	
28 September 1980, 15:10	Soyuz-U (11A511U)		LC-1/5, Baikonur	Successful	Progress 11	Salyut 6 Logistics
3 October 1980, 12:00	Soyuz-U (11A511U)		LC-41/1, Plesetsk	Successful	Kosmos 1213 (Zenit-6)	
10 October 1980, 13:10	Soyuz-U (11A511U)		LC-41/1, Plesetsk	Successful	Kosmos 1214 (Zenit-4MKM)	
16 October 1980, 12:20	Soyuz-U (11A511U)		LC-41/1, Plesetsk	Successful	Kosmos 1216 (Zenit-6)	
24 October 1980, 10:53	Molniya-M (8K78M)		LC-41/1, Plesetsk	Successful	Kosmos 1217 (Oko)	
30 October 1980, 10:00	Soyuz-U (11A511U)		LC-31/6, Baikonur	Successful	Kosmos 1218 (Yantar-4K1)	
31 October 1980, 12:00	Soyuz-U (11A511U)		LC-41/1, Plesetsk	Successful	Kosmos 1219 (Zenit-6)	
12 November 1980, 12:21	Soyuz-U (11A511U)		LC-41/1, Plesetsk	Successful	Kosmos 1221 (Zenit-6)	
16 November 1980, 04:18	Molniya-M (8K78M)		LC-41/1, Plesetsk	Successful	Molniya 1-48	
21 November 1980, 11:53	Vostok-2M (8A92M)		LC-43/3, Plesetsk	Successful	Kosmos 1222 (Tselina-D)	
27 November 1980, 14:18	Soyuz-U (11A511U)		LC-1/5, Baikonur	Successful	Soyuz T-3	Crewed orbital flight, 3 cosmonauts Docked with Salyut 6
27 November 1980, 21:37	Molniya-M (8K78M)		LC-41/1, Plesetsk	Successful	Kosmos 1223 (Oko)	
1 December 1980, 12:15	Soyuz-U (11A511U)		LC-43/3, Plesetsk	Successful	Kosmos 1224 (Zenit-6)	
16 December 1980, 12:15	Soyuz-U (11A511U)		LC-43/3, Plesetsk	Successful	Kosmos 1227 (Zenit-6)	
25 December 1980, 04:02	Molniya-M (8K78M)		LC-31/6, Baikonur	Successful	Prognoz 8	
26 December 1980, 16:10	Soyuz-U (11A511U)		LC-41/1, Plesetsk	Successful	Kosmos 1236 (Yantar-2K)	
== 1981 ==
6 January 1981, 12:15	Soyuz-U (11A511U)		LC-41/1, Plesetsk	Successful	Kosmos 1237 (Zenit-6)	
9 January 1981, 14:57	Molniya-M (8K78M)		LC-41/1, Plesetsk	Successful	Molniya 3-25L	
16 January 1981, 12:00	Soyuz-U (11A511U)		LC-41/1, Plesetsk	Successful	Kosmos 1239 (Zenit-4MT)	
20 January 1981, 11:00	Soyuz-U (11A511U)		LC-31/6, Baikonur	Successful	Kosmos 1240 (Yantar-2K)	
24 January 1981, 14:18	Soyuz-U (11A511U)		LC-1/5, Baikonur	Successful	Progress 12	Salyut 6 Logistics
27 January 1981, 14:58	Vostok-2M (8A92M)		LC-43/3, Plesetsk	Successful	Kosmos 1242 (Tselina-D)	
30 January 1981, 16:27	Molniya-M (8K78M)		LC-43/3, Plesetsk	Successful	Molniya 1-49	
13 February 1981, 11:15	Soyuz-U (11A511U)		LC-43/3, Plesetsk	Successful	Kosmos 1245 (Zenit-6)	
18 February 1981, 09:00	Soyuz-U (11A511U)		LC-31/6, Baikonur	Successful	Kosmos 1246 (Yantar-1KFT)	
19 February 1981, 10:00	Molniya-M (8K78M)		LC-16/2, Plesetsk	Successful	Kosmos 1247 (Oko)	First launch from LC-16/2 at the Plesetsk Cosmodrome
5 March 1981, 15:00	Soyuz-U (11A511U)		LC-41/1, Plesetsk	Successful	Kosmos 1249 (Yantar-2K)	
12 March 1981, 19:00	Soyuz-U (11A511U)		LC-1/5, Baikonur	Successful	Soyuz T-4	Crewed orbital flight, 2 cosmonauts Docked with Salyut 6
17 March 1981, 08:40	Soyuz-U (11A511U)		LC-31/6, Baikonur	Successful	Kosmos 1259 (Zenit-6)	
22 March 1981, 14:58	Soyuz-U (11A511U)		LC-31/6, Baikonur	Successful	Soyuz 39	Crewed orbital flight, 2 cosmonauts Docked with Salyut 6
24 March 1981, 03:31	Molniya-M (8K78M)		LC-41/1, Plesetsk	Successful	Molniya 3-24L	
28 March 1981, 09:30	Soyuz-U (11A511U)		LC-31/6, Baikonur	Failure	Yantar-2K 979	Blok V strap-on collided with the core stage at T+117 seconds due to improper separation sequence. Automatic shutoff command issued.
31 March 1981, 09:40	Molniya-M (8K78M)		LC-41/1, Plesetsk	Successful	Kosmos 1261 (Oko)	
7 April 1981, 10:51	Soyuz-U (11A511U)		LC-43/3, Plesetsk	Successful	Kosmos 1262 (Zenit-6)	
15 April 1981, 10:30	Soyuz-U (11A511U)		LC-31/6, Baikonur	Successful	Kosmos 1264 (Zenit-6)	
16 April 1981, 11:30	Soyuz-U (11A511U)		LC-41/1, Plesetsk	Successful	Kosmos 1265 (Zenit-6)	
28 April 1981, 09:00	Soyuz-U (11A511U)		LC-31/6, Baikonur	Successful	Kosmos 1268 (Zenit-6)	
14 May 1981, 17:16	Soyuz-U (11A511U)		LC-1/5, Baikonur	Successful	Soyuz 40	Crewed orbital flight, 2 cosmonauts Docked with Salyut 6
14 May 1981, 21:45	Vostok-2M (8A92M)		LC-43/3, Plesetsk	Successful	Meteor 2-7	
18 May 1981, 11:50	Soyuz-U (11A511U)		LC-31/6, Baikonur	Successful	Kosmos 1270 (Yantar-2K)	
19 May 1981, 03:49	Vostok-2M (8A92M)		LC-43/3, Plesetsk	Successful	Kosmos 1271 (Tselina-D)	
21 May 1981, 09:10	Soyuz-U (11A511U)		LC-31/6, Baikonur	Successful	Kosmos 1272 (Zenit-6)	
22 May 1981, 07:10	Soyuz-U (11A511U)		LC-41/1, Plesetsk	Successful	Kosmos 1273 (Zenit-4MKT)	
3 June 1981, 14:00	Soyuz-U (11A511U)		LC-41/1, Plesetsk	Successful	Kosmos 1274 (Yantar-2K)	
9 June 1981, 03:33	Molniya-M (8K78M)		LC-41/1, Plesetsk	Successful	Molniya 3-30L	
16 June 1981, 07:00	Soyuz-U (11A511U)		LC-43/3, Plesetsk	Successful	Kosmos 1276 (Zenit-4MKT)	
17 June 1981, 09:30	Soyuz-U (11A511U)		LC-31/6, Baikonur	Successful	Kosmos 1277 (Zenit-6)	
19 June 1981, 19:37	Molniya-M (8K78M)		LC-43/3, Plesetsk	Successful	Kosmos 1278 (Oko)	
24 June 1981, 17:47	Molniya-M (8K78M)		LC-43/3, Plesetsk	Successful	Molniya 1-50	
1 July 1981, 09:30	Soyuz-U (11A511U)		LC-31/6, Baikonur	Successful	Kosmos 1279 (Zenit-6)	
2 July 1981, 07:10	Soyuz-U (11A511U)		LC-43/3, Plesetsk	Successful	Kosmos 1280 (Resurs-F1)	
7 July 1981, 12:30	Soyuz-U (11A511U)		LC-43/3, Plesetsk	Successful	Kosmos 1281 (Zenit-6)	
10 July 1981, 05:14	Vostok-2M (8A92M)		LC-31/6, Baikonur	Successful	Meteor 1-31 (Meteor-Priroda 6)	
15 July 1981, 13:00	Soyuz-U (11A511U)		LC-31/6, Baikonur	Successful	Kosmos 1282 (Yantar-2K)	
17 July 1981, 08:00	Soyuz-U (11A511U)		LC-41/1, Plesetsk	Successful	Kosmos 1283 (Zenit-6)	
29 July 1981, 11:55	Soyuz-U (11A511U)		LC-41/1, Plesetsk	Successful	Kosmos 1284 (Zenit-6)	
4 August 1981, 00:13	Molniya-M (8K78M)		LC-16/2, Plesetsk	Successful	Kosmos 1285 (Oko)	
7 August 1981, 13:35	Vostok-2M (8A92M)		LC-43/3, Plesetsk	Successful	Interkosmos 22 (IKB-1300)	
13 August 1981, 16:20	Soyuz-U (11A511U)		LC-41/1, Plesetsk	Successful	Kosmos 1296 (Yantar-2K)	
18 August 1981, 09:30	Soyuz-U (11A511U)		LC-41/1, Plesetsk	Successful	Kosmos 1297 (Zenit-6)	
21 August 1981, 10:20	Soyuz-U (11A511U)		LC-1/5, Baikonur	Successful	Kosmos 1298 (Yantar-4K1)	
27 August 1981, 10:30	Soyuz-U (11A511U)		LC-41/1, Plesetsk	Successful	Kosmos 1301 (Resurs-F1)	
4 September 1981, 08:00	Soyuz-U (11A511U)		LC-31/6, Baikonur	Successful	Kosmos 1303 (Zenit-6)	
11 September 1981, 08:43	Molniya-M (8K78M)		LC-43/3, Plesetsk	Failure	Kosmos 1305 (Molniya 3-28L)	One ullage motor exploded due to pre-flight damage, rupturing the Blok L RP-1 tank and causing premature engine shutdown
15 September 1981, 11:30	Soyuz-U (11A511U)		LC-43/3, Plesetsk	Successful	Kosmos 1307 (Zenit-6)	
18 September 1981, 09:30	Soyuz-U (11A511U)		LC-43/3, Plesetsk	Successful	Kosmos 1309 (Zenit-4MT)	
1 October 1981, 09:00	Soyuz-U (11A511U)		LC-31/6, Baikonur	Successful	Kosmos 1313 (Zenit-6)	
9 October 1981, 10:40	Soyuz-U (11A511U)		LC-41/1, Plesetsk	Successful	Kosmos 1314 (Zenit-4MKT)	
13 October 1981, 23:01	Vostok-2M (8A92M)		LC-43/3, Plesetsk	Successful	Kosmos 1315 (Tselina-D)	
15 October 1981, 09:15	Soyuz-U (11A511U)		LC-31/6, Baikonur	Successful	Kosmos 1316 (Zenit-6)	
17 October 1981, 05:59	Molniya-M (8K78M)		LC-41/1, Plesetsk	Successful	Molniya 3-31L	
31 October 1981, 22:54	Molniya-M (8K78M)		LC-16/2, Plesetsk	Successful	Kosmos 1317 (Oko)	
3 November 1981, 13:00	Soyuz-U (11A511U)		LC-41/1, Plesetsk	Successful	Kosmos 1318 (Yantar-2K)	
13 November 1981, 09:30	Soyuz-U (11A511U)		LC-31/6, Baikonur	Successful	Kosmos 1319 (Zenit-6)	
17 November 1981, 15:25	Molniya-M (8K78M)		LC-41/1, Plesetsk	Successful	Molniya 1-51	
4 December 1981, 09:50	Soyuz-U (11A511U)		LC-31/6, Baikonur	Successful	Kosmos 1329 (Zenit-6)	
19 December 1981, 11:50	Soyuz-U (11A511U)		LC-31/6, Baikonur	Successful	Kosmos 1330 (Yantar-2K)	
23 December 1981, 13:15	Molniya-M (8K78M)		LC-1/5, Baikonur	Successful	Molniya 1-52	
== 1982 ==
12 January 1982, 12:30	Soyuz-U (11A511U)		LC-41/1, Plesetsk	Successful	Kosmos 1332 (Zenit-4MT)	
20 January 1982, 11:30	Soyuz-U (11A511U)		LC-16/2, Plesetsk	Successful	Kosmos 1334 (Zenit-6)	
30 January 1982, 11:30	Soyuz-U (11A511U)		LC-31/6, Baikonur	Successful	Kosmos 1336 (Yantar-2K)	
16 February 1982, 11:10	Soyuz-U (11A511U)		LC-41/1, Plesetsk	Successful	Kosmos 1338 (Zenit-6)	
19 February 1982, 01:42	Vostok-2M (8A92M)		LC-16/2, Plesetsk	Successful	Kosmos 1340 (Tselina-D)	
26 February 1982, 20:10	Molniya-M (8K78M)		LC-41/1, Plesetsk	Successful	Molniya 1-53	
3 March 1982, 05:44	Molniya-M (8K78M)		LC-16/2, Plesetsk	Successful	Kosmos 1341 (Oko)	
5 March 1982, 10:50	Soyuz-U (11A511U)		LC-41/1, Plesetsk	Successful	Kosmos 1342 (Zenit-6)	
17 March 1982, 10:30	Soyuz-U (11A511U)		LC-41/1, Plesetsk	Successful	Kosmos 1343 (Zenit-6)	
24 March 1982, 00:12	Molniya-M (8K78M)		LC-41/1, Plesetsk	Successful	Molniya 3-29L	
31 March 1982, 16:27	Vostok-2M (8A92M)		LC-16/2, Plesetsk	Successful	Kosmos 1346 (Tselina-D)	
2 April 1982, 10:15	Soyuz-U (11A511U)		LC-1/5, Baikonur	Successful	Kosmos 1347 (Yantar-4K2)	
7 April 1982, 13:42	Molniya-M (8K78M)		LC-16/2, Plesetsk	Successful	Kosmos 1348 (Oko)	
15 April 1982, 14:30	Soyuz-U (11A511U)		LC-41/1, Plesetsk	Successful	Kosmos 1350 (Yantar-2K)	
21 April 1982, 09:15	Soyuz-U (11A511U)		LC-31/6, Baikonur	Successful	Kosmos 1352 (Zenit-6)	
23 April 1982, 09:40	Soyuz-U (11A511U)		LC-41/1, Plesetsk	Successful	Kosmos 1353 (Zenit-4MKT)	
5 May 1982, 08:01	Vostok-2M (8A92M)		LC-16/2, Plesetsk	Successful	Kosmos 1356 (Tselina-D)	
13 May 1982, 09:58	Soyuz-U (11A511U)		LC-1/5, Baikonur	Successful	Soyuz T-5	Crewed orbital flight, 2 cosmonauts Docked with Salyut 7
15 May 1982, 14:20	Soyuz-U (11A511U)		LC-41/1, Plesetsk	Failure	Zenit-6	Foreign object in the flight control system to an erroneous shutdown command being sent to the Blok A engines at T+28 seconds. Launch vehicle crashed next to the pad.
20 May 1982, 13:09	Molniya-M (8K78M)		LC-41/1, Plesetsk	Successful	Kosmos 1367 (Oko)	
21 May 1982, 12:40	Soyuz-U (11A511U)		LC-31/6, Baikonur	Successful	Kosmos 1368 (Zenit-6)	
23 May 1982, 05:57	Soyuz-U (11A511U)		LC-1/5, Baikonur	Successful	Progress 13	Salyut 7 Logistics
25 May 1982, 09:00	Soyuz-U (11A511U)		LC-43/3, Plesetsk	Successful	Kosmos 1369 (Resurs-F1)	
28 May 1982, 09:10	Soyuz-U (11A511U)		LC-31/6, Baikonur	Successful	Kosmos 1370 (Yantar-1KFT)	
28 May 1982, 22:02	Molniya-M (8K78M)		LC-43/3, Plesetsk	Successful	Molniya 1-54	
2 June 1982, 12:50	Soyuz-U (11A511U)		LC-31/6, Baikonur	Successful	Kosmos 1373 (Zenit-6)	
8 June 1982, 07:45	Soyuz-U (11A511U)		LC-43/3, Plesetsk	Successful	Kosmos 1376 (Yantar-4K1)	
12 June 1982, 09:00	Soyuz-U (11A511U)		LC-1/5, Baikonur	Failure	Yantar-4K2	Liftoff damage results in loss of heat shield and wiring burn-through on Blok A. Automatic shutdown command issued T+49 seconds.
18 June 1982, 13:00	Soyuz-U (11A511U)		LC-31/6, Baikonur	Successful	Kosmos 1381 (Zenit-6)	
24 June 1982, 16:29	Soyuz-U (11A511U)		LC-1/5, Baikonur	Successful	Soyuz T-6	Crewed orbital flight, 3 cosmonauts Docked with Salyut 7
25 June 1982, 02:28	Molniya-M (8K78M)		LC-43/3, Plesetsk	Successful	Kosmos 1382 (Oko)	
30 June 1982, 15:00	Soyuz-U (11A511U)		LC-41/1, Plesetsk	Successful	Kosmos 1384 (Zenit-6)	
6 July 1982, 07:50	Soyuz-U (11A511U)		LC-41/1, Plesetsk	Successful	Kosmos 1385 (Zenit-6)	
10 July 1982, 19:58	Soyuz-U (11A511U)		LC-1/5, Baikonur	Successful	Progress 14	Salyut 7 Logistics
13 July 1982, 08:00	Soyuz-U (11A511U)		LC-43/3, Plesetsk	Successful	Kosmos 1387 (Zenit-4MKT)	
21 July 1982, 09:40	Molniya-M (8K78M)		LC-1/5, Baikonur	Successful	Molniya 1-55	
27 July 1982, 12:30	Soyuz-U (11A511U)		LC-16/2, Plesetsk	Successful	Kosmos 1396 (Zenit-6)	
3 August 1982, 11:30	Soyuz-U (11A511U)		LC-43/3, Plesetsk	Successful	Kosmos 1398 (Zenit-4MT)	
4 August 1982, 11:30	Soyuz-U (11A511U)		LC-31/6, Baikonur	Successful	Kosmos 1399 (Yantar-4K1)	
5 August 1982, 06:56	Vostok-2M (8A92M)		LC-16/2, Plesetsk	Successful	Kosmos 1400 (Tselina-D)	
19 August 1982, 17:11	Soyuz-U (11A511U)		LC-1/5, Baikonur	Successful	Soyuz T-7	Crewed orbital flight, 3 cosmonauts Docked with Salyut 7
20 August 1982, 09:50	Soyuz-U (11A511U)		LC-41/1, Plesetsk	Successful	Kosmos 1401 (Resurs-F1)	
27 August 1982, 00:02	Molniya-M (8K78M)		LC-41/1, Plesetsk	Successful	Molniya 3-33L	
1 September 1982, 09:00	Soyuz-U (11A511U)		LC-31/6, Baikonur	Successful	Kosmos 1403 (Zenit-6)	
1 September 1982, 11:40	Soyuz-U (11A511U)		LC-43/3, Plesetsk	Successful	Kosmos 1404 (Zenit-6)	
8 September 1982, 10:20	Soyuz-U (11A511U)		LC-41/1, Plesetsk	Successful	Kosmos 1406 (Zenit-4MKT)	
15 September 1982, 15:30	Soyuz-U (11A511U)		LC-41/1, Plesetsk	Successful	Kosmos 1407 (Yantar-2K)	
18 September 1982, 04:59	Soyuz-U (11A511U)		LC-1/5, Baikonur	Successful	Progress 15	Salyut 7 Logistics
22 September 1982, 06:23	Molniya-M (8K78M)		LC-16/2, Plesetsk	Successful	Kosmos 1409 (Oko)	
30 September 1982, 11:50	Soyuz-U (11A511U)		LC-16/2, Plesetsk	Successful	Kosmos 1411 (Zenit-6)	
14 October 1982, 09:10	Soyuz-U (11A511U)		LC-31/6, Baikonur	Successful	Kosmos 1416 (Zenit-6)	
31 October 1982, 11:20	Soyuz-U (11A511U)		LC-1/5, Baikonur	Successful	Progress 16	Salyut 7 Logistics
2 November 1982, 09:30	Soyuz-U (11A511U)		LC-31/6, Baikonur	Successful	Kosmos 1419 (Zenit-6)	
18 November 1982, 09:25	Soyuz-U (11A511U)		LC-31/6, Baikonur	Successful	Kosmos 1421 (Zenit-6)	
3 December 1982, 12:00	Soyuz-U (11A511U)		LC-43/3, Plesetsk	Successful	Kosmos 1422 (Zenit-6)	
8 December 1982, 13:46	Molniya-M (8K78M)		LC-1/5, Baikonur	Partial Failure	Kosmos 1423 (Oko)	Blok L failure, satellite unusable
14 December 1982, 22:30	Vostok-2M (8A92M)		LC-43/3, Plesetsk	Successful	Meteor 2-9	
16 December 1982, 10:00	Soyuz-U (11A511U)		LC-31/6, Baikonur	Successful	Kosmos 1424 (Yantar-4K1)	
23 December 1982, 09:10	Soyuz-U2 (11A511U2)		LC-31/6, Baikonur	Successful	Kosmos 1425 (Zenit-6)	Maiden flight of the Soyuz-U2 rocket
28 December 1982, 12:00	Soyuz-U (11A511U)		LC-31/6, Baikonur	Successful	Kosmos 1426 (Yantar-4KS1)	
== 1983 ==
20 January 1983, 17:26	Vostok-2M (8A92M)		LC-16/2, Plesetsk	Successful	Kosmos 1437 (Tselina-D)	
27 January 1983, 08:30	Soyuz-U2 (11A511U2)		LC-31/6, Baikonur	Successful	Kosmos 1438 (Zenit-6)	
6 February 1983, 11:31	Soyuz-U (11A511U)		LC-31/6, Baikonur	Successful	Kosmos 1439 (Yantar-2K)	
10 February 1983, 07:15	Soyuz-U (11A511U)		LC-41/1, Plesetsk	Successful	Kosmos 1440 (Resurs-F1)	
16 February 1983, 10:03	Vostok-2M (8A92M)		LC-16/2, Plesetsk	Successful	Kosmos 1441 (Tselina-D)	
25 February 1983, 12:45	Soyuz-U (11A511U)		LC-41/1, Plesetsk	Successful	Kosmos 1442 (Yantar-4K1)	
2 March 1983, 10:50	Soyuz-U (11A511U)		LC-41/1, Plesetsk	Successful	Kosmos 1444 (Zenit-6)	
11 March 1983, 15:29	Molniya-M (8K78M)		LC-41/1, Plesetsk	Successful	Molniya 3-34L	
16 March 1983, 08:50	Soyuz-U2 (11A511U2)		LC-31/6, Baikonur	Successful	Kosmos 1446 (Zenit-6)	
16 March 1983, 18:14	Molniya-M (8K78M)		LC-41/1, Plesetsk	Successful	Molniya 1-56	
31 March 1983, 10:50	Soyuz-U (11A511U)		LC-16/2, Plesetsk	Successful	Kosmos 1449 (Zenit-6)	
2 April 1983, 02:02	Molniya-M (8K78M)		LC-1/5, Baikonur	Successful	Molniya 1-57	
8 April 1983, 08:30	Soyuz-U (11A511U)		LC-43/4, Plesetsk	Successful	Kosmos 1451 (Zenit-6)	
20 April 1983, 13:10	Soyuz-U (11A511U)		LC-1/5, Baikonur	Successful	Soyuz T-8	Crewed orbital flight, 3 cosmonauts Failed to dock with Salyut 7
22 April 1983, 14:30	Soyuz-U (11A511U)		LC-41/1, Plesetsk	Successful	Kosmos 1454 (Yantar-2K)	
25 April 1983, 19:34	Molniya-M (8K78M)		LC-16/2, Plesetsk	Successful	Kosmos 1456 (Oko)	
26 April 1983, 10:00	Soyuz-U (11A511U)		LC-31/6, Baikonur	Successful	Kosmos 1457 (Yantar-4K1)	
28 April 1983, 08:30	Soyuz-U (11A511U)		LC-41/1, Plesetsk	Successful	Kosmos 1458 (Zenit-4MKT)	
6 May 1983, 09:10	Soyuz-U (11A511U)		LC-31/6, Baikonur	Successful	Kosmos 1460 (Zenit-6)	
17 May 1983, 08:00	Soyuz-U (11A511U)		LC-41/1, Plesetsk	Successful	Kosmos 1462 (Resurs-F1)	
26 May 1983, 12:00	Soyuz-U (11A511U)		LC-31/6, Baikonur	Successful	Kosmos 1466 (Yantar-4K1)	
31 May 1983, 11:40	Soyuz-U (11A511U)		LC-43/4, Plesetsk	Successful	Kosmos 1467 (Zenit-6)	
7 June 1983, 07:50	Soyuz-U (11A511U)		LC-41/1, Plesetsk	Successful	Kosmos 1468 (Resurs-F1)	
14 June 1983, 12:15	Soyuz-U (11A511U)		LC-43/4, Plesetsk	Successful	Kosmos 1469 (Zenit-6)	
27 June 1983, 09:12	Soyuz-U (11A511U)		LC-1/5, Baikonur	Successful	Soyuz T-9	Crewed orbital flight, 2 cosmonauts Docked with Salyut 7
28 June 1983, 15:00	Soyuz-U (11A511U)		LC-41/1, Plesetsk	Successful	Kosmos 1471 (Yantar-2K)	
1 July 1983, 12:17	Molniya-M (8K78M)		LC-31/6, Baikonur	Successful	Prognoz 9	
5 July 1983, 07:50	Soyuz-U (11A511U)		LC-41/1, Plesetsk	Successful	Kosmos 1472 (Zenit-6)	
8 July 1983, 19:21	Molniya-M (8K78M)		LC-43/3, Plesetsk	Successful	Kosmos 1481 (Oko)	
13 July 1983, 09:40	Soyuz-U (11A511U)		LC-31/6, Baikonur	Successful	Kosmos 1482 (Zenit-6)	
19 July 1983, 15:14	Molniya-M (8K78M)		LC-1/5, Baikonur	Successful	Molniya 1-58	
20 July 1983, 08:00	Soyuz-U (11A511U)		LC-43/4, Plesetsk	Successful	Kosmos 1483 (Resurs-F1)	
24 July 1983, 05:30	Vostok-2M (8A92M)		LC-31/6, Baikonur	Successful	Kosmos 1484 (Resurs-OE)	
26 July 1983, 12:00	Soyuz-U (11A511U)		LC-16/2, Plesetsk	Successful	Kosmos 1485 (Zenit-6)	
5 August 1983, 09:20	Soyuz-U (11A511U)		LC-43/4, Plesetsk	Successful	Kosmos 1487 (Resurs-F1)	
9 August 1983, 11:20	Soyuz-U (11A511U)		LC-43/3, Plesetsk	Successful	Kosmos 1488 (Zenit-6)	
10 August 1983, 13:00	Soyuz-U (11A511U)		LC-31/6, Baikonur	Successful	Kosmos 1489 (Yantar-4K1)	
17 August 1983, 12:08	Soyuz-U (11A511U)		LC-1/5, Baikonur	Successful	Progress 17	Salyut 7 Logistics
23 August 1983, 11:05	Soyuz-U (11A511U)		LC-43/4, Plesetsk	Successful	Kosmos 1493 (Zenit-6)	
30 August 1983, 22:49	Molniya-M (8K78M)		LC-41/1, Plesetsk	Successful	Molniya 3-32L	
3 September 1983, 10:15	Soyuz-U (11A511U)		LC-43/4, Plesetsk	Successful	Kosmos 1495 (Zenit-4MKT)	
7 September 1983, 13:24	Soyuz-U (11A511U)		LC-16/2, Plesetsk	Successful	Kosmos 1496 (Yantar-4K1)	
9 September 1983, 11:00	Soyuz-U (11A511U)		LC-43/4, Plesetsk	Successful	Kosmos 1497 (Zenit-6)	
14 September 1983, 10:25	Soyuz-U (11A511U)		LC-41/1, Plesetsk	Successful	Kosmos 1498 (Resurs-F1)	
17 September 1983, 11:15	Soyuz-U (11A511U)		LC-41/1, Plesetsk	Successful	Kosmos 1499 (Zenit-6)	
26 September 1983, 19:37	Soyuz-U (11A511U)		LC-1/5, Baikonur	Failure	Soyuz 7K-ST No.16L	Intended crewed orbital flight, 2 cosmonauts Intended to dock with Salyut 7 Fuel valve malfunction results in fuel leak and on-pad fire, followed by explosion of the booster. Ground controllers activated the crew escape system; crew unharmed after landing 4 kilometers from the pad.
14 October 1983, 10:00	Soyuz-U (11A511U)		LC-31/6, Baikonur	Successful	Kosmos 1504 (Yantar-4K2)	
20 October 1983, 09:59	Soyuz-U (11A511U)		LC-31/6, Baikonur	Successful	Progress 18	Salyut 7 Logistics
21 October 1983, 12:10	Soyuz-U (11A511U)		LC-16/2, Plesetsk	Successful	Kosmos 1505 (Zenit-6)	
28 October 1983, 09:00	Vostok-2M (8A92M)		LC-16/2, Plesetsk	Successful	Meteor 2-10	
17 November 1983, 12:15	Soyuz-U (11A511U)		LC-16/2, Plesetsk	Successful	Kosmos 1509 (Zenit-6)	
23 November 1983, 16:45	Molniya-M (8K78M)		LC-41/1, Plesetsk	Successful	Molniya 1-59	
30 November 1983, 13:45	Soyuz-U (11A511U)		LC-41/1, Plesetsk	Successful	Kosmos 1511 (Yantar-4K1)	
7 December 1983, 12:10	Soyuz-U (11A511U)		LC-41/1, Plesetsk	Successful	Kosmos 1512 (Zenit-6)	
14 December 1983, 07:00	Soyuz-U (11A511U)		LC-41/1, Plesetsk	Successful	Kosmos 1514 (Bion)	
21 December 1983, 06:08	Molniya-M (8K78M)		LC-41/1, Plesetsk	Successful	Molniya 3-35L	
27 December 1983, 09:30	Soyuz-U (11A511U)		LC-31/6, Baikonur	Successful	Kosmos 1516 (Yantar-1KFT)	
28 December 1983, 03:48	Molniya-M (8K78M)		LC-16/2, Plesetsk	Successful	Kosmos 1518 (Oko)	
== 1984 ==
11 January 1984, 12:20	Soyuz-U (11A511U)		LC-43/4, Plesetsk	Successful	Kosmos 1530 (Zenit-6)	
13 January 1984, 14:40	Soyuz-U (11A511U)		LC-41/1, Plesetsk	Successful	Kosmos 1532 (Yantar-4K2)	
26 January 1984, 08:50	Soyuz-U2 (11A511U2)		LC-31/6, Baikonur	Successful	Kosmos 1533 (Zenit-6)	
8 February 1984, 12:07	Soyuz-U (11A511U)		LC-31/6, Baikonur	Successful	Soyuz T-10	Crewed orbital flight, 3 cosmonauts Docked with Salyut 7
16 February 1984, 08:15	Soyuz-U (11A511U)		LC-41/1, Plesetsk	Successful	Kosmos 1537 (Resurs-F1)	
21 February 1984, 06:46	Soyuz-U (11A511U)		LC-31/6, Baikonur	Successful	Progress 19	Salyut 7 Logistics
28 February 1984, 13:59	Soyuz-U (11A511U)		LC-16/2, Plesetsk	Successful	Kosmos 1539 (Yantar-4K2)	
6 March 1984, 17:10	Molniya-M (8K78M)		LC-16/2, Plesetsk	Successful	Kosmos 1541 (Oko)	
7 March 1984, 08:00	Soyuz-U2 (11A511U2)		LC-31/6, Baikonur	Successful	Kosmos 1542 (Zenit-6)	
10 March 1984, 17:00	Soyuz-U (11A511U)		LC-41/1, Plesetsk	Successful	Kosmos 1543 (Efir)	
16 March 1984, 23:29	Molniya-M (8K78M)		LC-41/1, Plesetsk	Successful	Molniya 1-60	
21 March 1984, 11:05	Soyuz-U (11A511U)		LC-43/4, Plesetsk	Successful	Kosmos 1545 (Zenit-6)	
3 April 1984, 13:08	Soyuz-U (11A511U)		LC-31/6, Baikonur	Successful	Soyuz T-11	Crewed orbital flight, 3 cosmonauts Docked with Salyut 7
4 April 1984, 01:40	Molniya-M (8K78M)		LC-16/2, Plesetsk	Successful	Kosmos 1547 (Oko)	
10 April 1984, 14:00	Soyuz-U (11A511U)		LC-41/1, Plesetsk	Successful	Kosmos 1548 (Yantar-4K2)	
15 April 1984, 08:12	Soyuz-U2 (11A511U2)		LC-31/6, Baikonur	Successful	Progress 20	Salyut 7 Logistics
19 April 1984, 11:40	Soyuz-U (11A511U)		LC-16/2, Plesetsk	Successful	Kosmos 1549 (Zenit-6)	
7 May 1984, 22:47	Soyuz-U (11A511U)		LC-31/6, Baikonur	Successful	Progress 21	Salyut 7 Logistics
11 May 1984, 13:00	Soyuz-U (11A511U)		LC-41/1, Plesetsk	Successful	Kosmos 1551 (Zenit-6)	
14 May 1984, 14:00	Soyuz-U (11A511U)		LC-31/6, Baikonur	Successful	Kosmos 1552 (Yantar-4KS1)	
22 May 1984, 08:30	Soyuz-U (11A511U)		LC-43/4, Plesetsk	Successful	Kosmos 1557 (Zenit-4MKT)	
25 May 1984, 11:30	Soyuz-U (11A511U)		LC-16/2, Plesetsk	Successful	Kosmos 1558 (Yantar-4K2)	
28 May 1984, 14:12	Soyuz-U (11A511U)		LC-31/6, Baikonur	Successful	Progress 22	Salyut 7 Logistics
1 June 1984, 13:50	Soyuz-U (11A511U)		LC-43/4, Plesetsk	Successful	Kosmos 1568 (Zenit-6)	
6 June 1984, 15:34	Molniya-M (8K78M)		LC-16/2, Plesetsk	Successful	Kosmos 1569 (Oko)	
11 June 1984, 08:40	Soyuz-U (11A511U)		LC-1/5, Baikonur	Successful	Kosmos 1571 (Zenit-8)	
15 June 1984, 08:20	Soyuz-U (11A511U)		LC-41/1, Plesetsk	Successful	Kosmos 1572 (Resurs-F1)	
19 June 1984, 10:55	Soyuz-U (11A511U)		LC-16/2, Plesetsk	Successful	Kosmos 1573 (Zenit-6)	
22 June 1984, 07:40	Soyuz-U (11A511U)		LC-43/4, Plesetsk	Successful	Kosmos 1575 (Resurs-F1)	
26 June 1984, 15:35	Soyuz-U (11A511U)		LC-41/1, Plesetsk	Successful	Kosmos 1576 (Yantar-4K2)	
29 June 1984, 15:00	Soyuz-U (11A511U)		LC-43/4, Plesetsk	Successful	Kosmos 1580 (Zenit-8)	
3 July 1984, 21:31	Molniya-M (8K78M)		LC-43/4, Plesetsk	Successful	Kosmos 1581 (Oko)	
17 July 1984, 17:40	Soyuz-U2 (11A511U2)		LC-31/6, Baikonur	Successful	Soyuz T-12	Crewed orbital flight, 3 cosmonauts Docked with Salyut 7 First crewed use of Soyuz-U2 11A511U2
19 July 1984, 08:30	Soyuz-U (11A511U)		LC-43/4, Plesetsk	Successful	Kosmos 1582 (Resurs-F1)	
24 July 1984, 12:40	Soyuz-U (11A511U)		LC-16/2, Plesetsk	Successful	Kosmos 1583 (Zenit-8)	
27 July 1984, 09:00	Soyuz-U (11A511U)		LC-41/1, Plesetsk	Successful	Kosmos 1584 (Zenit-8)	
31 July 1984, 12:29	Soyuz-U (11A511U)		LC-1/5, Baikonur	Successful	Kosmos 1585 (Yantar-4K2)	
2 August 1984, 08:38	Molniya-M (8K78M)		LC-16/2, Plesetsk	Successful	Kosmos 1586 (Oko)	
6 August 1984, 14:00	Soyuz-U (11A511U)		LC-41/1, Plesetsk	Successful	Kosmos 1587 (Zenit-8)	
10 August 1984, 00:03	Molniya-M (8K78M)		LC-41/1, Plesetsk	Successful	Molniya 1-61	
14 August 1984, 06:28	Soyuz-U (11A511U)		LC-1/5, Baikonur	Successful	Progress 23	Salyut 7 Logistics
16 August 1984, 09:50	Soyuz-U (11A511U)		LC-41/1, Plesetsk	Successful	Kosmos 1590 (Resurs-F1)	
24 August 1984, 08:26	Molniya-M (8K78M)		LC-43/4, Plesetsk	Successful	Molniya 1-62	
30 August 1984, 10:10	Soyuz-U (11A511U)		LC-43/4, Plesetsk	Successful	Kosmos 1591 (Resurs-F1)	
4 September 1984, 10:20	Soyuz-U (11A511U)		LC-16/2, Plesetsk	Successful	Kosmos 1592 (Zenit-8)	
7 September 1984, 19:13	Molniya-M (8K78M)		LC-16/2, Plesetsk	Successful	Kosmos 1596 (Oko)	
13 September 1984, 10:25	Soyuz-U (11A511U)		LC-43/4, Plesetsk	Successful	Kosmos 1597 (Zenit-4MKT)	
25 September 1984, 14:30	Soyuz-U (11A511U)		LC-43/4, Plesetsk	Successful	Kosmos 1599 (Yantar-4K2)	
27 September 1984, 08:10	Soyuz-U (11A511U)		LC-1/5, Baikonur	Successful	Kosmos 1600 (Zenit-8)	
4 October 1984, 19:49	Molniya-M (8K78M)		LC-16/2, Plesetsk	Successful	Kosmos 1604 (Oko)	
14 November 1984, 07:40	Soyuz-U (11A511U)		LC-1/5, Baikonur	Successful	Kosmos 1608 (Yantar-1KFT)	
14 November 1984, 12:20	Soyuz-U (11A511U)		LC-43/4, Plesetsk	Successful	Kosmos 1609 (Zenit-8)	
21 November 1984, 10:30	Soyuz-U (11A511U)		LC-1/5, Baikonur	Successful	Kosmos 1611 (Yantar-4K2)	
29 November 1984, 14:00	Soyuz-U (11A511U)		LC-43/4, Plesetsk	Successful	Kosmos 1613 (Zenit-8)	
14 December 1984, 20:40	Molniya-M (8K78M)		LC-41/1, Plesetsk	Successful	Molniya 1-63	
