= Kurilovo, Kaluga Oblast =

Kurilovo Курилово
- Village
- Location within Kaluga Oblast Location within Russia
- Coordinates: 55°06′07″N 37°01′57″E
- Country: Russia
- Region: Kaluga Oblast
- District: Zhukovsky District
- Time zone: UTC+3:00

Kurilovo (Russian: Курилово) is a rural locality (a village) in the Zhukovsky District, Kaluga Oblast, Russia. Population: 52 (2010 census); 80 (2002 census);
