= US-K =

Series of Soviet/Russian missile warning satellites, 1975-2010

Oko
- Manufacturer: TsNII Kometa; NPO Lavochkin
- Country of origin: Soviet Union; Russia
- Applications: Early warning of missile attack

Specifications
- Regime: Molniya

Production
- Status: Inoperable
- Built: 86+
- Launched: 85
- Operational: 2
- Lost: 6
- Maiden launch: Kosmos 775; 8 October 1975
- Last launch: Kosmos 2469; 30 August 2010

Upravlyaemy Sputnik Kontinentalny (US-K; Russian: Управляемый Спутник Континентальный meaning Continental Controllable Satellite; Russian: УС-К) is a series of Russian, previously Soviet, satellites used to detect missile launches as part of the Oko system. It consists of a constellation of satellites, usually in molniya orbits, designated under the Kosmos system. The satellites are built by the company NPO Lavochkin and are launched on Molniya-M rockets. Oko can be directly translated as the Russian word for eye. As of June 2014, only two of the eight satellites in orbit were still functional, rendering the system inoperable.

== History ==
US-K are the first generation of Oko satellites, the first of which was launched in 1972. The vast majority of the satellites launched (86 out of 100 as of March 2012) have been US-K satellites in molniya orbits. Seven first generation satellites were launched into geosynchronous orbits, called US-KS, starting in 1975. A decree of 3 September 1979 led to the creation of the second generation satellites US-KMO which had their first launch in 1991. In total, 101 satellites have been launched.

After the dissolution of the Soviet Union, the rate of launches decreased, but Russia remained committed to the programme. A fully functioning constellation with 5 satellites was restored in 2001, but a fire in May 2001 in the Oko control facility at Serpukhov-15 near Kurilovo outside Moscow reduced the number of operational satellites to 2. A further satellite was launched in the same year. Between 2002 and 2006, there were no Oko launches, until another Oko satellite, designated Kosmos 2422, was launched in July 2006.

In 2006, Russia had one operational US-KMO (Kosmos 2379) satellite and four US-K satellites (Kosmos 2422, Kosmos 2393, Kosmos 2351, Kosmos 2368). In June 2011, Kosmos 2422, Kosmos 2430, Kosmos 2446 and Kosmos 2469 were reported to be the only operational satellites.

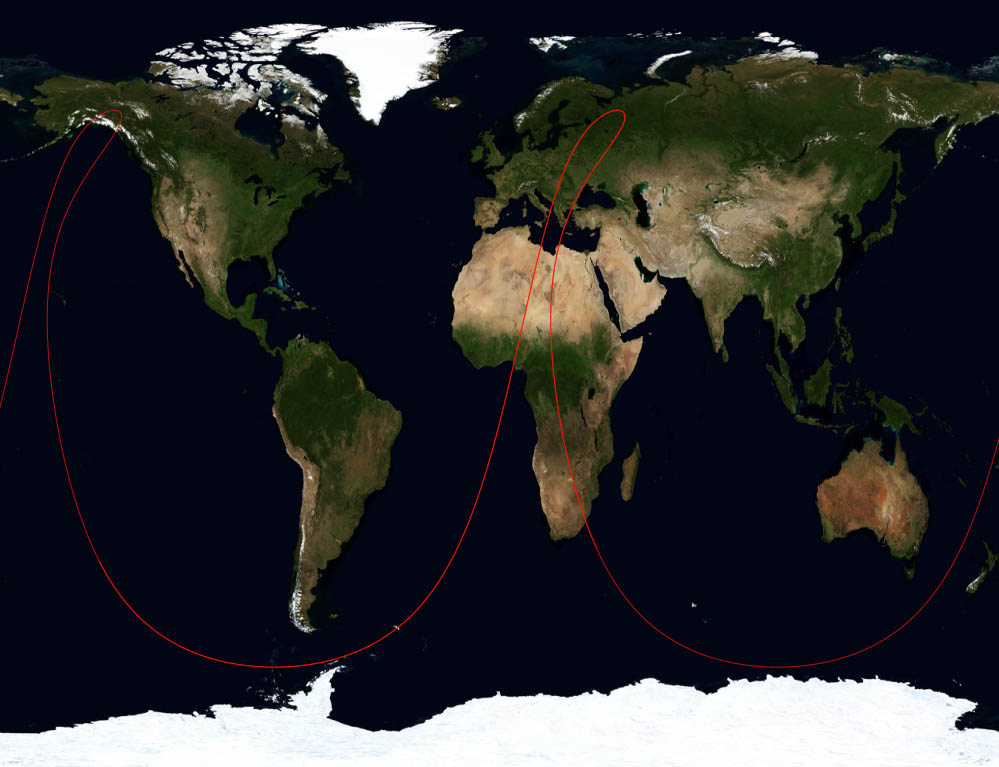
Ground track of Kosmos 2469

== Satellites ==
The Oko satellites are drum-shaped, 2 metres long and with a diameter of 1.7 m. They weigh 1,250 kilograms without fuel and 2,400 kilograms when fully loaded. They have a 350 kg infrared telescope pointing toward Earth, with a 4 m conical sunshield and an instrument bus. The telescope, which is the satellites' main instrument, is able to detect radiation from ascending missiles. Two solar panels provide a total of 2.8 kW of power. There are also several smaller, wider-angle telescopes to supplement the main instrument. The satellites have 16 liquid fuel engines for attitude control and 4 for maneuvering.

The system requires at least 4 satellites to be fully functional. The danger of false alarms increases when there are fewer than 4 satellites in orbit, due to the inability to double-check a detection. However, this risk is reduced by the presence of the US-KMO geosynchronous satellites.

The satellites are built by NPO Lavochkin and launched with Molniya-M rockets. The advantages of Oko include that the system is reliable and well-established, and that it uses the relatively inexpensive (but now discontinued) Molniya launcher.

The last US-K satellite (Kosmos 2469) was launched on 30 September 2010. As of December 2015, the entire Oko programme is being replaced by the new EKS system.
