= Molniya orbit =

Type of high-latitude satellite orbit

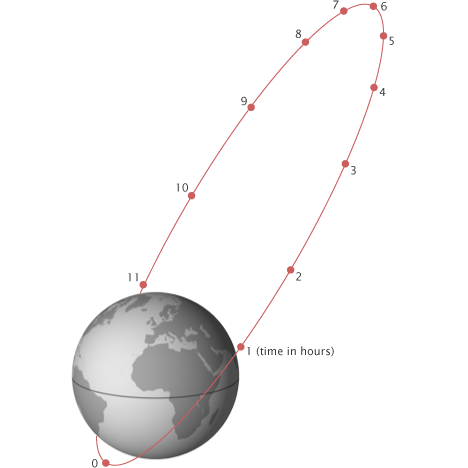
Figure 1: The Molniya orbit. Usually the period from perigee +2 hours to perigee +10 hours is used to transmit to the northern hemisphere.

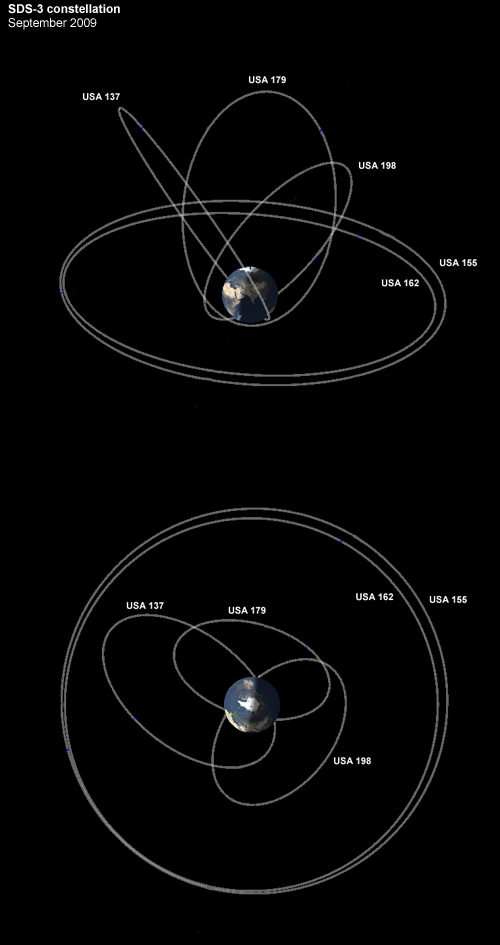
Figure 2: The SDS constellation, which uses satellites in a mixture of geostationary and Molniya orbits. The constellation of Molniya-orbiting satellites uses three satellites on different orbital planes, with apogees comparable to those of the geostationary satellites.

A Molniya orbit (Russian: Молния, IPA: [ˈmoɫnʲɪjə], "Lightning") is a type of satellite orbit designed to provide communications and remote sensing coverage over high latitudes. It is a highly elliptical orbit with an inclination of 63.4 degrees, an argument of perigee of 270 degrees, and an orbital period of about half a sidereal day. The name comes from the Molniya satellites, a series of Soviet/Russian civilian and military communications satellites that have used this type of orbit since the mid-1960s. A variation on the Molniya orbit is the Three Apogee orbit.

The Molniya orbit has a long dwell time over the hemisphere of interest, while moving very quickly over the other. In practice, this places it over either Russia or Canada for most of its orbit, providing a high angle of view to communications and monitoring satellites covering these high-latitude areas. Geostationary orbits, which are necessarily inclined over the equator, can only view these regions from a low angle, hampering performance. In practice, a satellite in a Molniya orbit serves the same purpose for high latitudes as a geostationary satellite does for equatorial regions, except that multiple satellites are required for continuous coverage.

Satellites placed in Molniya orbits have been used for television broadcasting, telecommunications, military communications, relaying, weather monitoring, early warning systems and classified surveillance purposes.

== History ==
The Molniya orbit was discovered by Soviet scientists in the 1960s as a high-latitude communications alternative to geostationary orbits, which require large launch energies to achieve a high perigee and to change inclination to orbit over the equator (especially when launched from Russian latitudes). As a result, OKB-1 sought a less energy-demanding orbit. Studies found that this could be achieved using a highly elliptical orbit with an apogee over Russian territory. The orbit's name refers to the "lightning" speed with which the satellite passes through the perigee.

The first use of the Molniya orbit was by the communications satellite series of the same name. After two launch failures, and one satellite failure in 1964, the first successful satellite to use this orbit, Molniya 1-1, launched on 23 April 1965. The early Molniya-1 satellites were used for civilian television, telecommunication and long-range military communications, but they were also fitted with cameras used for weather monitoring, and possibly for assessing clear areas for Zenit spy satellites. The original Molniya satellites had a lifespan of approximately 1.5 years, as their orbits were disrupted by perturbations, and they had to be constantly replaced.

The succeeding series, the Molniya-2, provided both military and civilian broadcasting and was used to create the Orbita television network, spanning the Soviet Union. These were in turn replaced by the Molniya-3 design. A satellite called Mayak was designed to supplement and replace the Molniya satellites in 1997, but the project was cancelled, and the Molniya-3 was replaced by the Meridian satellites, the first of which launched in 2006. The Soviet US-K early warning satellites, which watch for American rocket launches, were launched in Molniya orbits from 1967, as part of the Oko system.

From 1971, the American Jumpseat and Trumpet military satellites were launched into Molniya orbits (and possibly used to intercept Soviet communications from the Molniya satellites). Detailed information about both projects remains classified as of 2019. This was followed by the American SDS constellation, which operates with a mixture of Molniya and geostationary orbits. These satellites are used to relay signals from lower flying satellites back to ground stations in the United States and have been active in some capacity since 1976. A Russian satellite constellation called Tyulpan was designed in 1994 to support communications at high latitudes, but it did not progress past the planning phase.

In 2015 and 2017 Russia launched two Tundra satellites into a Molniya orbit, despite their name, as part of its EKS early warning system.

Animation of EKS

Equatorial view

Polar view

Earth fixed frame, front view

Earth fixed frame, side view

Kosmos 2510 · Kosmos 2518 · Kosmos 2541 · Kosmos 2546 · Earth

== Uses ==
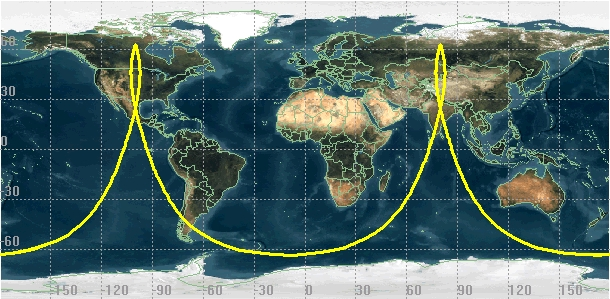
Figure 3: Groundtrack of a Molniya orbit. In the operational part of the orbit (four hours on each side of apogee), the satellite is north of 55.5° N (latitude of, for example, central Scotland, Moscow and southern part of Hudson Bay). A satellite in this orbits spends most of its time over the northern hemisphere and passes quickly over the southern hemisphere.

Much of the area of the former Soviet Union, and Russia in particular, is located at high northern latitudes. To broadcast to these latitudes from a geostationary orbit (above the Earth's equator) requires considerable power due to the low elevation angles, and the extra distance and atmospheric attenuation that comes with it. Sites located above 81° latitude are unable to view geostationary satellites at all, and as a rule of thumb, elevation angles of less than 10° can cause problems, depending on the communications frequency.

A satellite in a Molniya orbit is better suited to communications in these regions, because it looks more directly down on them during large portions of its orbit. With an apogee altitude as high as 40,000 kilometres (25,000 mi) and an apogee sub-satellite point of 63.4 degrees north, it spends a considerable portion of its orbit with excellent visibility in the northern hemisphere, from Russia as well as from northern Europe, Greenland and Canada.

While satellites in Molniya orbits require considerably less launch energy than those in geostationary orbits (especially launching from high latitudes), their ground stations need steerable antennas to track the spacecraft, links must be switched between satellites in a constellation and range changes cause variations in signal amplitude. Additionally, there is a greater need for station-keeping, and the spacecraft will pass through the Van Allen radiation belt four times per day.

=== Southern hemisphere proposals ===
Similar orbits with an argument of perigee of 90° could allow high-latitude coverage in the southern hemisphere. A proposed constellation, the Antarctic Broadband Program, would have used satellites in an inverted Molniya orbit to provide broadband internet service to facilities in Antarctica. Initially funded by the now defunct Australian Space Research Programme, it did not progress beyond initial development.

=== Molniya constellations ===
Permanent high-latitude coverage of a large area of Earth (like the whole of Russia, where the southern parts are about 45° N) requires a constellation of at least three spacecraft in Molniya orbits. If three spacecraft are used, then each spacecraft will be active for a period of eight hours per orbit, centered around apogee, as illustrated in figure 4. Figure 5 shows the satellite's field of view around the apogee.

The Earth completes half a rotation in twelve hours, so the apogees of successive Molniya orbits will alternate between one half of the northern hemisphere and the other. For the original Molniya orbit, the apogees were placed over Russia and North America, but by changing the right ascension of the ascending node this can be varied. The coverage from a satellite in a Molniya orbit over Russia is shown in figures 6 to 8, and over North America in figures 9 to 11.

The orbits of the three spacecraft should then have the same orbital parameters, but different right ascensions of the ascending nodes, with their passes over the apogees separated by 7.97 hours. Since each satellite has an operational period of approximately eight hours, when one spacecraft travels four hours after its apogee passage (see figure 8 or figure 11), then the next satellite will enter its operational period, with the view of the earth shown in figure 6 (or figure 9), and the switch-over can take place. Note that the two spacecraft at the time of switch-over are separated by about 1,500 kilometres (930 mi), so that the ground stations only have to move their antennas a few degrees to acquire the new spacecraft.

=== Diagrams ===
Figure 4: A constellation of three Molniya spacecraft providing service for the Northern hemisphere. P is the orbital period. A green line corresponds to service for Asia and Europe with the visibility of figures 6–8. A red line corresponds to service for North America with the visibility of figures 9–11.

Figure 5: Illumination zones (at least 10° elevation) from a Molniya orbit. At apogee, the green illumination zone applies. At three hours before or after apogee, the red zone applies. At four hours before or after apogee, the blue zone applies. The plane of the figure is the longitudinal plane of apogee rotating with the Earth. In the eight-hour period centered at the apogee passage, the longitudinal plane is almost fixed, the longitude of the satellite varies by only ±2.7°. The views of the Earth from these three points are displayed in figures 6–11.

Figure 6: View of the Earth four hours before apogee from a Molniya orbit under the assumption that the longitude of the apogee is 90° E. The spacecraft is at an altitude of 24,043 km over the point 92.65° E 47.04° N.

Figure 7: View of the Earth from the apogee of a Molniya orbit under the assumption that the longitude of the apogee is 90° E. The spacecraft is at an altitude of 39,867 km over the point 90° E 63.43° N.

Figure 8: View of the Earth four hours after apogee from a Molniya orbit under the assumption that the longitude of the apogee is 90° E. The spacecraft is at an altitude of 24,043 km over the point 87.35° E 47.04° N

Figure 9: View of the Earth four hours before apogee from a Molniya orbit under the assumption that the longitude of the apogee is 90° W. The spacecraft is at an altitude of 24,043 km over the point 87.35° W 47.04° N.

Figure 10: View of the Earth from the apogee of a Molniya orbit under the assumption that the longitude of the apogee is 90° W. The spacecraft is at an altitude of 39,867 km over the point 90° W 63.43° N.

Figure 11: View of the Earth 4 hours after apogee from a Molniya orbit under the assumption that the longitude of the apogee is 90° W. The spacecraft is at an altitude of 24,043 km over the point 92.65° W 47.04° N.
Comparison of Tundra orbit, QZSS orbit and Molniya orbit - equatorial view

Front view

Side view

Earth fixed frame, Front view

Earth fixed frame, Side view

Tundra orbit · QZSS orbit · Molniya orbit · Earth

== Properties ==
A typical Molniya orbit has the following properties:

- Argument of perigee: 270°
- Inclination: 63.4°
- Period: 718 minutes
- Eccentricity: 0.74
- Semi-major axis: 26,600 km (16,500 mi)

=== Argument of perigee ===
The argument of perigee is set at 270°, causing the satellite to experience apogee at the most northerly point of its orbit. For any future applications over the southern hemisphere, it would instead be set at 90°.

=== Orbital inclination ===
In general, the oblateness of the Earth perturbs the argument of perigee ($\omega$), so that it gradually changes with time. If we only consider the first-order coefficient $J_2$, the perigee will change according to equation 1, unless it is constantly corrected with station-keeping thruster burns.

$\dot{\omega} = \frac{3}{4}\cdot n J_2\cdot\left(\frac{R_E}{a}\right)^2 \frac{4-5\sin^2{i}}{(1-e^2)^2}$	1

where $i$ is the orbital inclination, $e$ is the eccentricity, $n$ is mean motion in degrees per day, $J_2$ is the perturbing factor, $R_E$ is the radius of the earth, $a$ is the semimajor axis, and $\dot{\omega}$ is in degrees per day.

To avoid this expenditure of fuel, the Molniya orbit uses an inclination of 63.4°, for which the factor $4-5\sin^2{i}$ is zero, so that there is no change in the position of perigee over time. An orbit designed in this manner is called a frozen orbit.

=== Orbital period ===
To ensure the geometry relative to the ground stations repeats every 24 hours, the period should be about half a sidereal day, keeping the longitudes of the apogees constant.

However, the oblateness of the Earth also perturbs the right ascension of the ascending node ($\Omega$), changing the nodal period and causing the ground track to drift over time at the rate shown in equation 2.

$\dot{\Omega} = -\frac{3}{2}\cdot n J_2\cdot\left(\frac{R_E}{a}\right)^2 \frac{\cos{i}} {(1-e^2)^2}$	2

where $\dot{\Omega}$ is in degrees per day.

Since the inclination of a Molniya orbit is fixed (as above), this perturbation is $\dot{\Omega} = -0.3$ degrees per day. To compensate, the orbital period is adjusted so that the longitude of the apogee changes enough to cancel out this effect.

=== Eccentricity ===
The eccentricity of the orbit is based on the differences in altitudes of its apogee and perigee. To maximise the amount of time that the satellite spends over the apogee, the eccentricity should be set as high as possible. However, the perigee needs to be high enough to keep the satellite substantially above the atmosphere to minimize drag (~600km), and the orbital period needs to be kept to approximately half a sidereal day (as above). These two factors constrain the eccentricity, which becomes approximately 0.737.

=== Semi-major axis ===
The exact height of a satellite in a Molniya orbit varies between missions, but a typical orbit will have a perigee altitude of approximately 600 kilometres (370 mi) and an apogee altitude of 39,700 kilometres (24,700 mi), for a semi-major axis of 26,600 kilometres (16,500 mi).

== Modelling ==
To track satellites using Molniya orbits, scientists use the SDP4 simplified perturbations model, which calculates the location of a satellite based on orbital shape, drag, radiation, gravitation effects from the sun and moon, and earth resonance terms.

== See also ==
- List of orbits
- Tundra orbit
