= Soyuz T-6 =

1982 Soviet crewed spaceflight to Salyut 7

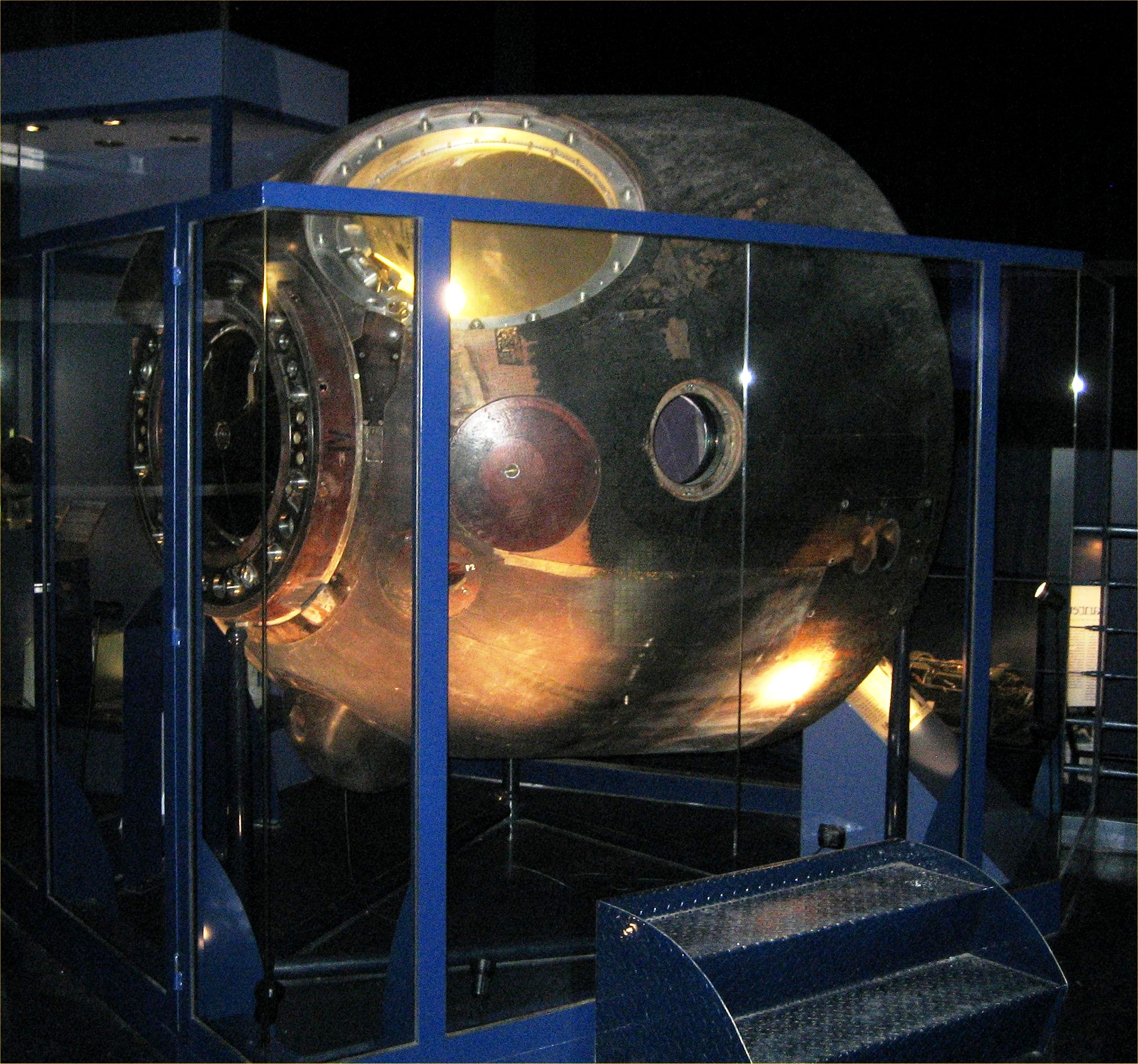
- The Soyuz T-6 reentry capsule on display at the Musée de l'air et de l'espace
- COSPAR ID: 1982-063A
- SATCAT no.: 13292
- Mission duration: 7 days, 21 hours, 50 minutes, 52 seconds
- Orbits completed: 125

Spacecraft properties
- Spacecraft type: Soyuz-T
- Manufacturer: NPO Energia
- Launch mass: 6,850 kilograms (15,100 lb)

Crew
- Crew size: 3
- Members: Vladimir Dzhanibekov; Aleksandr Ivanchenkov; Jean-Loup Chrétien
- Callsign: Pamir (Pamirs)

Start of mission
- Launch date: 24 June 1982, 16:29:48 UTC
- Rocket: Soyuz-U
- Launch site: Baikonur 1/5

End of mission
- Landing date: 2 July 1982, 14:20:40 UTC
- Landing site: 65 kilometres (40 mi) NE of Arkalyk

Orbital parameters
- Reference system: Geocentric
- Regime: Low Earth
- Perigee altitude: 189 kilometres (117 mi)
- Apogee altitude: 233 kilometres (145 mi)
- Inclination: 51.7 degrees
- Period: 88.7 minutes

Docking with Salyut 7
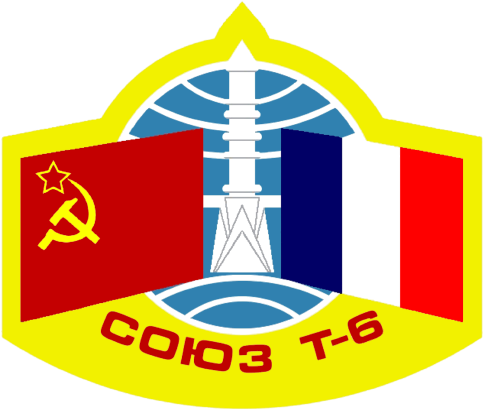
- Soyuz programme (Crewed missions)

Soyuz T-6 was a human spaceflight to Earth orbit to the Salyut 7 space station in 1982. Along with two Soviet cosmonauts, the crew included a Frenchman, Jean-Loup Chrétien.

The Soyuz-T spacecraft arrived at Salyut 7 following launch on 24 June 1982 and one day of solo operations. During the T-6 mission's time docked to the station, the crew performed joint Soviet-French experiments, including cardiovascular echography, alongside the station's resident crew.

== Crew ==
Position	Crew
Commander	Vladimir Dzhanibekov; Third spaceflight
Flight engineer	Aleksandr Ivanchenkov; Second and last spaceflight
Research cosmonaut	Jean-Loup Chrétien; First spaceflight

=== Backup crew ===
Position	Crew
Commander	Leonid Kizim
Flight engineer	Vladimir Solovyov
Research cosmonaut	Patrick Baudry

== Mission parameters ==
- Mass: 6850 kg
- Perigee: 189 km
- Apogee: 233 km
- Inclination: 51.7°
- Period: 88.7 minutes

== Mission highlights ==
Soyuz T-6 launched from the Baikonur Cosmodrome on 24 June 1982 at 16:29 GMT. Docking with the Salyut 7 station was completed manually after problems arose with the spacecraft's onboard automatic docking systems.

Once aboard Salyut 7, the crew completed joint Soviet-French, including echography and antibiotic experiments, with the station's resident crew, the crew of Soyuz T-5.

The mission transported the first French astronaut, Jean-Loup Chrétien, into space. While aboard the station, the resident crew afforded him the opportunity to eject Salyut 7's weekly bag of waste into space through the station's small trash airlock. Valentin Lebedev, writing in his diary, quoted Chrétien as saying Salyut 7 "is simple, doesn't look impressive, but is reliable."

== Spacecraft location ==
The Soyuz T-6 reentry capsule is on permanent display at the Musée de l'air et de l'espace, an aerospace museum at the Paris–Le Bourget Airport, north of Paris, France.
