= Soyuz T-13 =

1985 Soviet crewed spaceflight to Salyut 7

- COSPAR ID: 1985-043A
- SATCAT no.: 15804
- Mission duration: 112 days, 3 hours, 12 minutes, 6 seconds
- Orbits completed: 2,645

Spacecraft properties
- Spacecraft type: Soyuz-T
- Manufacturer: NPO Energia
- Launch mass: 6,850 kilograms (15,100 lb)

Crew
- Crew size: 2
- Members: Vladimir Dzhanibekov
- Launching: Viktor Savinykh
- Landing: Georgi Grechko
- Callsign: Pamir (after a mountain range in Central Asia)

Start of mission
- Launch date: June 6, 1985, 06:39:52 UTC
- Rocket: Soyuz-U2
- Launch site: Baikonur 1/5

End of mission
- Landing date: September 26, 1985, 09:51:58 UTC

Orbital parameters
- Reference system: Geocentric
- Regime: Low Earth
- Perigee altitude: 198 kilometres (123 mi)
- Apogee altitude: 222 kilometres (138 mi)
- Inclination: 51.6 degrees
- Period: 88.7 minutes

Docking with Salyut 7

Soyuz T-13 was a Soyuz mission, transporting personnel to the Soviet space station Salyut 7. The eighth expedition to the orbital station, the mission launched from Baikonur Cosmodrome, atop a Soyuz-U2 carrier rocket, at 06:39:52 UTC on June 6, 1985. It is of note because it marked the first time a spacecraft had docked with a 'dead' space station, and the first time such a station had been returned to operational status following repairs.

== Crew ==
Position	Launching crew	Landing crew
Commander	Vladimir Dzhanibekov; Fifth and last spaceflight	
Flight engineer	Viktor Savinykh; Second spaceflight	Georgi Grechko; Third and last spaceflight

=== Backup crew ===
Position	Crew
Commander	Leonid Popov
Flight engineer	Aleksandr Pavlovich Aleksandrov

== Mission highlights ==
Soyuz T-13 was the 8th expedition to Salyut 7.

Vladimir Dzhanibekov, having previously flown to Salyut 7 on the Soyuz T-12 mission, returned on the next flight which was to become the first to dock manually with an inert space station, as the station had been crippled by a solar array problem. For this purpose modifications were made to the Soyuz spacecraft to include control levers for proximity operations. Viktor Savinykh's and Vladimir Dzhanibekov's mission was successful and they were able to salvage the Salyut 7 station. Savinykh remained aloft for 169 days, returning to Earth in Soyuz T-14; Dzhanibekov returned to Earth in Soyuz T-13 with Grechko after spending 110 days on Salyut 7. Before deorbiting, Soyuz T-13 spent about 30 hours conducting rendezvous and docking tests.

=== Salvaging Salyut 7 ===
The effort to salvage Salyut 7 was, in the words of author David S. F. Portree, "one of the most impressive feats of in-space repairs in history". As the crew approached the inert station, they saw that its solar arrays were pointing randomly as it rolled slowly about its long axis. They used a handheld laser rangefinder to judge their distance, and conducted a fly-around inspection to be certain the exterior was intact. Dzhanibekov noted that the thermal blankets on the transfer compartment had turned a dull gray from prolonged exposure to sunlight.

Dzhanibekov piloted his ship to intercept the forward port of Salyut 7, matched the station's rotation and achieved soft dock with the station. Upon achieving hard dock—the first time a Soyuz had docked with an inert space station—the crew confirmed through the electrical connectors in the docking collars that the Salyut 7 electrical system was dead. They carefully sampled the air in the station before opening the hatch. The station air was very cold, but breathable. Frost covered the walls and apparatus. The cosmonauts wore winter garb, including fur-lined hats, as they entered the station.

The first order of business was to restore electric power. Two of the eight batteries were destroyed, the rest fully discharged. Dzhanibekov determined that a sensor in the solar array pointing system had failed, preventing the batteries from recharging. A telemetry radio problem prevented the TsUP (mission control center) from detecting the problem. Salyut 7 had quickly run down its batteries, shutting down all its systems and accounting for the break in radio contact. The cosmonauts set about recharging the batteries and used Soyuz T-13 to turn the station in order to point its solar arrays to the sun.

On June 10, 1985 they turned on the air heaters. The cosmonauts relied on the Soyuz T-13 air regeneration system until they could get the Salyut 7 system back in order. On June 13, 1985 the attitude control system was successfully reactivated. This was cause for jubilation, as it meant Kosmos 1669 (a Progress supply spacecraft) bearing replacement parts could dock with Salyut 7. The station's water tanks thawed by the end of June 1985 – freezing had destroyed the water heater, so the cosmonauts used a powerful television light to heat fluids. Wall heaters were turned on only after all the frost had evaporated, in order to prevent water from entering equipment. Normal atmospheric humidity was achieved only at the end of July 1985, nearly two months after docking.

== See also ==
- 2010: The Year We Make Contact, a 1984 science fiction film which depicts the revival of an inert spacecraft by a joint Soviet/American crew
- Salyut 7, a 2017 Russian film dramatizing the events of Soyuz T-13
- Soyuz 10, the first mission to dock to a space station, which had to be aborted as hard-dock with Salyut 1 was not achievable
- Soyuz T-15, a mission to ferry equipment from Salyut 7 to Mir, which had to manually maneuver and dock to Mir
- United States' Space Shuttle missions around this time:
  - STS-51-G (launched in June 1985)
  - STS-51-F (July-August 1985)
  - STS-51-I (August-September 1985)
