= Galina Balashova =

Russian architect

Galina Andreevna Balashova
- Born: December 4, 1931 (age 94); Kolomna, USSR
- Education: Moscow Architectural Institute
- Occupation: Architect
- Spouse: Yuri Pavlovich Balashov
- Projects: Salyut 6, Salyut 7, Buran, Mir

Galina Andreevna Balashova (Russian: Галина Андреевна Балашова, born 1931) is a Russian architect and designer who was associated with the Soviet space program.

== Life ==
Balashova was born in Kolomna and was educated at the Moscow Architectural Institute. Balashova began her career in 1955 at the GiproAviaProm design institute in Kuibyshev. Her work at this time involved removing decorative elements, considered "decadent", from residential buildings. In 1957, she became senior architect at OKB-1, which was responsible for design during the early days of the Soviet space program. She began by designing residences for employees but later contributed to the interior design of the Soyuz spacecraft and the Salyut and Mir space stations. Balashova also worked as a consultant for the Buran programme. She retired in 1991 upon the collapse of the Soviet Union, making her work no longer a State secret and available to the public.

== Work ==
Her work with the space program included the design of interior spaces, furniture, control panels, decorative logos and murals for interior walls. Balashova designed for a zero gravity environment, using contrasting colors for floor and ceiling so that astronauts would not become disoriented. Her color schemes come from her experience doing watercolors as a child, where she began her artistic education. Balashova also used the color green in her designs so the televisions at the time would produce the color truthfully.

In 2018 in the United States for the first time Galina Balashova's remarkable life and professional accomplishments have been uncovered and emphasized in talks presented at international conferences organized by two leading American universities.

Her design for lapel pins used at the Aérosalons exhibition in France in 1973 later became official emblem for the Apollo–Soyuz Test Project. Balashova was denied approval to attach her name to her own drawing under the "pretext of safety," losing the opportunity to spread her name among 100,000 distributed pins at the exhibition. Press coverage increased in the Soviet Union and the United States but Balashova still failed to receive any credit for her designs. When the lapel pins began production in a factory in Mytishchi, certificates for Balashova's design were created by the factory's artistic committee without approval of the government. Balashova's superiors became enraged that she held not only the copyright, but also she was officially registered as the creator; her superiors considered themselves to be the creators of the emblem, and that the workers were only following their direction. Bobkov, one of her superiors, threatened to place Balashova in jail for 8 years "for the betrayal of State secrets." Balashova was only able to save herself by claiming it was not her, but the factory who submitted the certificate, and that she was forced to sign a declaration of renunciation and restrict any future royalty payments for the emblem. For comparison, a male in the department found the emblem and reproduced it with a hexagonal profile and reportedly received tens of thousands of dollars for his design, which was simply a replica of Balashova's design.

Galina Balashova's pioneering achievements are illuminated in major planned volumes on women's contribution to architecture, but her contributions to zero gravity designs are rarely recognized today beyond a few minor exhibitions and these volumes.

== See also ==
- Zarema Nagayeva

== Literature ==
- Brown, Lori; Burns, Karen, eds. (2021). The Bloomsbury Global Encyclopedia of Women in Architecture, 1960–2015. New York and London: Bloomsbury.
- Dominoni, Annalisa (2020). Design of Supporting Systems for Life in Outer Space: A Design Perspective on Space Missions Near Earth and Beyond. Cham: Springer Nature. ISBN 978-3-030-60942-9.
- Meuser, Philipp (2015). Galina Balashova : architect of the Soviet space programme. Berlin: Basics. ISBN 9783869223551.
- Sokolina, Anna, ed. (2021). The Routledge Companion to Women in Architecture. Routledge. p. 436. ISBN 9781032014104.
