= Soyuz T-7 =

1982 Soviet crewed spaceflight to Salyut 7

- COSPAR ID: 1982-080A
- SATCAT no.: 13425
- Mission duration: 113 days, 1 hour, 50 minutes, 44 seconds
- Orbits completed: ~1,825

Spacecraft properties
- Spacecraft type: Soyuz-T
- Manufacturer: NPO Energia
- Launch mass: 6,850 kilograms (15,100 lb)

Crew
- Crew size: 3 up 2 down
- Launching: Leonid Popov; Aleksandr Serebrov; Svetlana Savitskaya
- Landing: Anatoli Berezovoy; Valentin Lebedev
- Callsign: Днепр (Dnieper)

Start of mission
- Launch date: August 19, 1982, 17:11:52 UTC
- Rocket: Soyuz-U
- Launch site: Baikonur 1/5

End of mission
- Landing date: December 10, 1982, 19:02:36 UTC
- Landing site: (70 kilometres (43 mi; 38 nmi) NE of Arkalyk?)

Orbital parameters
- Reference system: Geocentric
- Regime: Low Earth
- Perigee altitude: 289 kilometres (180 mi)
- Apogee altitude: 299 kilometres (186 mi)
- Inclination: 51.6 degrees
- Period: 90.3 minutes

Docking with Salyut 7
- Docking date: August 20, 1982, 18:32 UTC
- Undocking date: December 10, 1982, 15:45 UTC

Soyuz T-7 (Russian: Союз Т-7; code name Dnieper) was the third Soviet space mission to the Salyut 7 space station. Crew member Svetlana Savitskaya was the first woman in space in almost twenty years, since Valentina Tereshkova who flew in 1963 on Vostok 6.

Savitskaya was given the orbital module of Soyuz T-7 for privacy. The Soyuz T-7 crew delivered experiments and mail from home to the Elbrus crew. On August 21 the five cosmonauts traded seat liners between the Soyuz Ts. The Dnieper undocked in Soyuz T-5, leaving the newer Soyuz T-7 spacecraft for the long-duration crew.

== Crew ==
Position	Launching crew	Landing crew
Commander	Leonid Popov; Third and last spaceflight	Anatoli Berezovoy; Only spaceflight
Flight engineer	Aleksandr Serebrov; First spaceflight	Valentin Lebedev; Second and last spaceflight
Research cosmonaut	Svetlana Savitskaya; First spaceflight	None

=== Backup crew ===
Position	Crew
Commander	Vladimir Vasyutin
Flight engineer	Viktor Savinykh
Research cosmonaut	Irina Pronina

== Mission highlights ==
Soyuz T-7 was an early flight to Salyut 7, the Soviet successor to Salyut 6. The crew which launched on Soyuz T-7 remained aboard the station for eight days, as a short-term "visiting crew", accompanying the station's long-term resident crew. The crew exchanged Soyuz vehicles with the resident crew, returning home in the older Soyuz T-5, leaving the fresher Soyuz T-7 available to the resident crew as a return vehicle. This practice had been used several times on Salyut 6.

Savitskaya became the second woman in space, and the first to visit a space station.

== Mission parameters ==
- Mass: 6,850 kg
- Perigee: 289 km
- Apogee: 299 km
- Inclination: 51.6°
- Period: 90.3 minutes

== Gallery ==
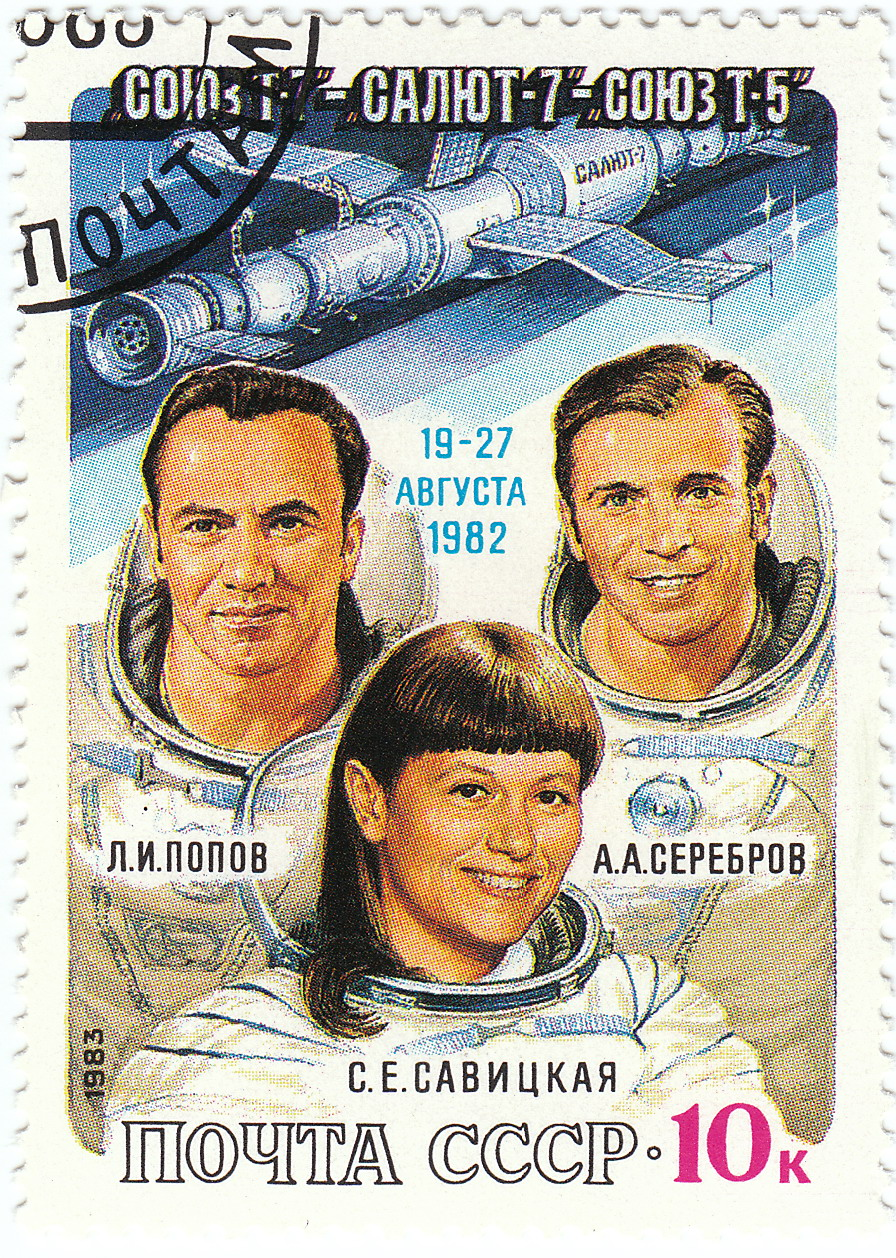
Dnieper crew

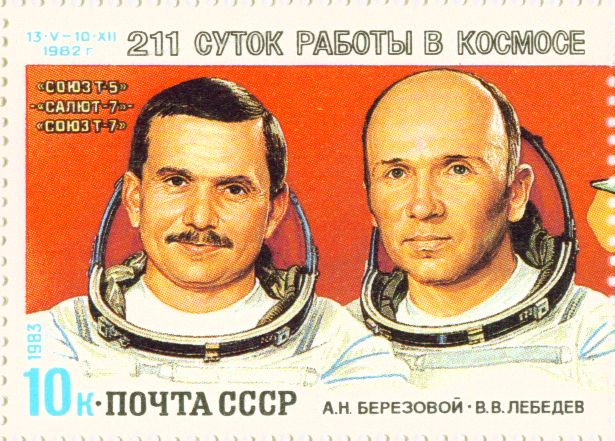
Elbrus crew

== See also ==
- 1982 in spaceflight
