= Soyuz T-5 =

1982 Soviet crewed spaceflight to Salyut 7

- COSPAR ID: 1982-042A
- SATCAT no.: 13173
- Mission duration: 106 days, 5 hours, 6 minutes, 11 seconds

Spacecraft properties
- Spacecraft type: Soyuz-T
- Manufacturer: NPO Energia
- Launch mass: 6,850 kilograms (15,100 lb)

Crew
- Crew size: 2 up 3 down
- Launching: Anatoli Berezovoy; Valentin Lebedev
- Landing: Leonid Popov; Aleksandr Serebrov; Svetlana Savitskaya
- Callsign: Эльбру́с (Elbrus)

Start of mission
- Launch date: May 13, 1982, 09:58:05 UTC
- Rocket: Soyuz-U
- Launch site: Baikonur 1/5

End of mission
- Landing date: August 27, 1982, 15:04:16 UTC
- Landing site: 225 kilometres (140 mi) E of Dzhezkazgan

Orbital parameters
- Reference system: Geocentric
- Regime: Low Earth
- Perigee altitude: 190 kilometres (120 mi)
- Apogee altitude: 231 kilometres (144 mi)
- Inclination: 51.6 degrees
- Period: 89.7 minutes

Docking with Salyut 7
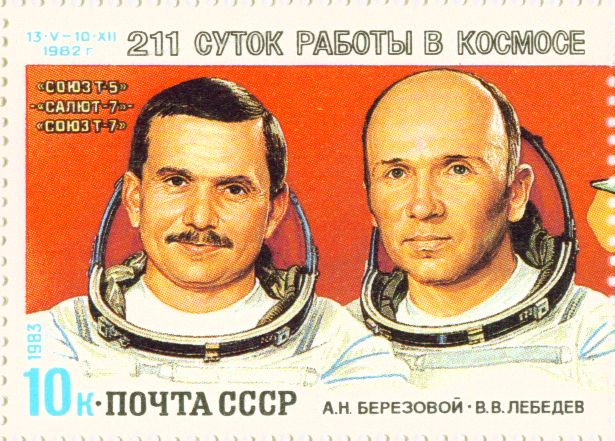
- Elbrus crew Soyuz programme (Crewed missions)

Soyuz T-5 was a human spaceflight into Earth orbit to the then new Salyut 7 space station in 1982. While the Soyuz-T was docked it received visits from the uncrewed Progress 13 resupply spacecraft, and the crewed Soyuz T-6 and Soyuz T-7.

The first crew hand launched an amateur radio satellite, the T-6 mission included a visiting Frenchman, and T-7 included the first woman in space in 20 years. It was the first mission to Salyut 7, but more than one spacecraft could be docked to S7 at a time, which is why the later missions could overlap with Soyuz T-5. The spacecraft launched with two people ("Elbrus crew"), and returned with three ("Dnieper crew").

== Crew ==
Position	Launching crew	Landing crew
Commander	Anatoli Berezovoy; Only spaceflight	Leonid Popov; Third and last spaceflight
Flight engineer	Valentin Lebedev; Second and last spaceflight	Aleksandr Serebrov; First spaceflight
Research cosmonaut	None	Svetlana Savitskaya; First spaceflight

=== Backup crew ===
Position	Crew
Commander	Vladimir Titov
Flight engineer	Gennady Strekalov

== Mission parameters ==
- Mass: 6850 kg
- Perigee: 190 km
- Apogee: 231 km
- Inclination: 51.6°
- Period: 89.7 minutes

== Mission highlights ==
This was the first (1st) expedition to the new Salyut 7 space station, launched into Earth orbit earlier in 1982. Salyut 7 was similar to the Salyut 6 (1977–1982) space station it superseded, but featured a number of improvements. The Soyuz T-5 spacecraft docked with Salyut 7 in orbit, and it was visited by the 2nd and 3rd expeditions to the space station. One advantage the new Salyut 7 station had over Salyut 6, was continuously available hot water.

The Elbrus crew ejected a 28-kg amateur radio satellite from a Salyut 7 trash airlock on May 17, 1982. The Soviets called this the first launch of a communications satellite from a crewed space vehicle. They did this ahead of the launch of two large geostationary satellites from the U.S. Space Shuttle (STS-5, November 11–16, 1982).

On May 25, the Elbrus crew reoriented Salyut 7 so the aft end of the Progress pointed toward Earth. This placed the station in gravity-gradient stabilization. Lebedev remarked in his diary that the attitude control jets were “very noisy,” and that they sounded like “hitting a barrel with a sledgehammer.” Of Salyut 7 during the unpacking of Progress 13, Lebedev said, “It looks like we’re getting ready to move or have just moved to a new apartment.” The following day the Elbrus crew closed the hatch from the work compartment into the intermediate compartment so the TsUP could pump fuel from Progress 13 to Salyut 7. The crew monitored the operation but played little active role in it. May 29 was spent organizing the supplies delivered. At the same time, according to Lebedev, “we filled the resupply ship with what we don’t need and tied them down with ropes. When I enter the resupply ship, it jingles with a metallic sound, so when we separate it will sound like a brass band.” Progress 13 pumped 300 liters of water aboard on May 31. On June 2 Progress 13 lowered the station's orbit to 300 km to receive Soyuz T-6.

In July, Valentin Lebedev, in charge of the plant experiments, reported that the Arabidopsis plants, chosen for their short 40-day lifecycle, had become the first plants to flower and produce seeds in the zero gravity of space, a Guinness World Record.

=== End of T-5 ===
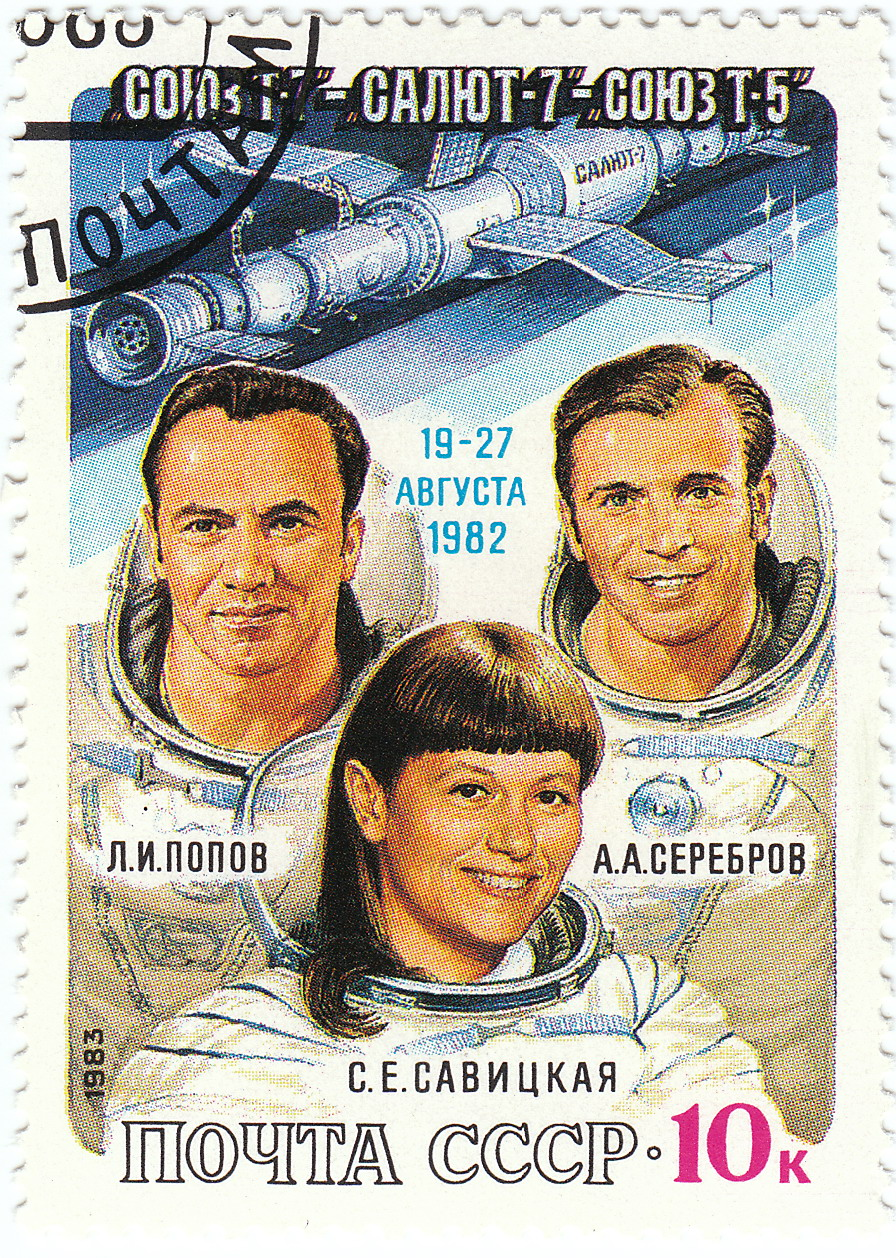
Dneiper crew

The Soyuz T-5 spacecraft was undocked in August 1982, leaving Salyut 7 and Soyuz T-7 spacecraft in orbit. The spacecraft returned to Earth successfully with Popov, Serebrov and Savitskaya, also called the "Dneiper crew". The Soyuz T-5 had been in space six weeks.

The initial "Elbrus crew", would return to Earth in the Soyuz T-7 spacecraft in December 1982.
