= Salyut 7 (film) =

2017 Russian historical drama film directed by Klim Shipenko

- Theatrical release poster
- Directed by: Klim Shipenko
- Screenplay by: Aleksey Samolyotov (ru); Klim Shipenko; Alexey Chupov; Natalya Merkulova; Bakur Bakuradze (ru)
- Produced by: Anton Zlatopolskiy (ru); Sergey Selyanov (ru); Bakur Bakuradze (ru); Yuliya Mishkinene; Natalya Smirnova; Nadezhda Anikeeva
- Starring: Vladimir Vdovichenkov; Pavel Derevyanko; Aleksandr Samoylenko; Vitaliy Khaev; Oksana Fandera; Mariya Mironova; Lyubov Aksyonova; Aleksandr Ratnikov
- Cinematography: Sergey Astakhov; Ivan Burlakov
- Edited by: Mariya Sergeenkova
- Music by: Ivan Burlyaev (ru)
- Production companies: Russia-1; STV Film Company; Lemon Films Studio; Vita Aktiva; Globus-film; Mosfilm Studios; Lenfilm
- Distributed by: Nashe Kino
- Release date: October 12, 2017 (Russia)
- Country: Russia
- Languages: Russian, English
- Budget: 400 million ₽
- Box office: 783 million ₽ $16,746,823

Salyut 7 (Russian: Салют-7) is a 2017 Russian disaster film directed by Klim Shipenko and written by Aleksey Samolyotov, the film stars Vladimir Vdovichenkov and Pavel Derevyanko. The story is based on the Soyuz T-13 mission in 1985, part of the Soviet Salyut programme; it was the first time in history that a 'dead' space station was docked with, and brought back into service.

The film was released in Russia on October 12, 2017 by Nashe Kino in RealD 3D.

In 2018, the picture was awarded the “Golden Eagle (Film Award, 2018)” prize for Best Film and Best Film Editing; “Nika (Film Award, 2018)” awards for “Best Cinematography” and “Nika” nominations for “Best Feature Film”.

== Plot ==
The Soviet Union, June 1985. After contact with the Salyut 7 space station is lost, cosmonauts Vladimir Fyodorov and Viktor Alyokhin attempt to dock with the empty, frozen craft to bring it back to life.

== Cast ==
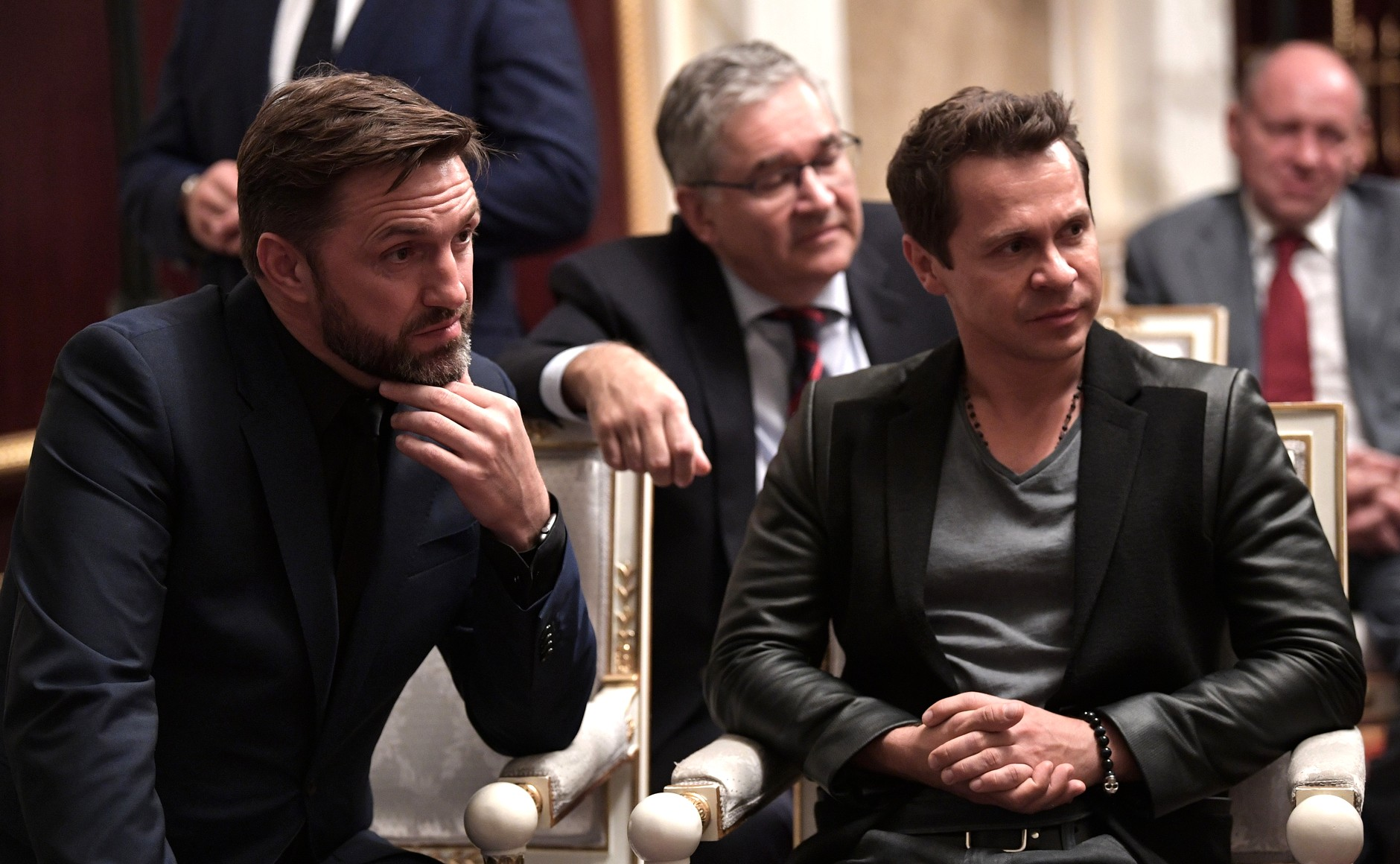
It stars Vladimir Vdovichenkov and Pavel Derevyanko.

- Vladimir Vdovichenkov as Vladimir Fyodorov (based on Vladimir Dzhanibekov), cosmonaut and mission commander
- Pavel Derevyanko as Viktor Alyokhin (based on Viktor Savinykh), cosmonaut and Vladimir's co-pilot
- Aleksandr Samoylenko as Valeriy Shubin, flight director (based on Valery Ryumin), USSR pilot-cosmonaut No. 41
- Vitaliy Khaev as Yuriy Shumakov
- Oksana Fandera as Svetlana Lazareva (based on Svetlana Savitskaya), cosmonaut (cameo appearance)
- Mariya Mironova as Nina Fyodorova, Vladimir Fyodorov's wife
- Polina Rudenko as Olya Fyodorova, Vladimir Fyodorov's daughter
- Lyubov Aksyonova as Liliya Alyokhina, Viktor Alyokhin's wife
- Aleksandr Ratnikov as Sasha, Valeriy Shubin's Deputy
- Igor Ugolnikov as Boldyrev
- Nikita Panfilov as Igor Zaitsev, an astronaut
- Natalya Kudryashova as a physician
- Artur Vakha as a psychiatrist
- Aleksandra Serebryakova, as TsUP employee
- Sergey Korenkov as TsUP employee
- Leonid Paranin as TsUP employee
- Stepan Patnikov as TsUP employee
- Oksana Syrtsova as Lena, TsUP employee
- Vladimir Matveev as top general
- Klim Shipenko as Patrick de Bonnel (based on Jean-Loup Chrétien)

== Production ==
=== Development ===
The idea of the film, based on real events to save the Salyut 7 orbital station, belongs to television journalist Alexei Samoletov, specializing in space issues. According to producer Bakur Bakuradze, the authors of the script relied on the diaries of Viktor Savinykh, that talk in detail about the entire expedition, but "it’s difficult for a person who does not know the subtleties of the space theme to understand all the details. Therefore, some things had to be simplified, and some, on the contrary, strengthened, adapted for our understanding." For these reasons, the names of the main protagonists have been changed.

The authors of the film chose material that allowed them to remain true to the facts. The consultants were cosmonauts Sergei Krikalev and Aleksandr Lazutkin, the head of the Roscosmos by Igor Komarov and specialists from the SP Korolev Rocket and Space Corporation Energia (corporation).

A specially constructed shooting pavilion was located in a suburb of Saint Petersburg, as the Lenfilm premises were not able to accommodate everything needed. A copy of the TsUP and the Cosmonaut Training Center was created with life-size models of Salyut-7 and Soyuz T-13. Enterprises of the state corporation «Roscosmos» - OAO Rocket and Space Corporation «Energia» and FGBU «Research institute Yuri Gagarin Cosmonaut Training Center» - provided for filming equipment previously visited in space.

Sergey Astakhov, who is known not only as a cameraman, but also as a master in terms of difficult shooting techniques, was invited to design and control complex shooting devices. On the project, he was an operator of space scenes and an engineer of the entire technological part of the shooting. For each frame, their own shooting systems were developed, different suspensions and mounting methods were used to realistically show interaction with objects in zero gravity and to ensure a smooth transition to computer animation.

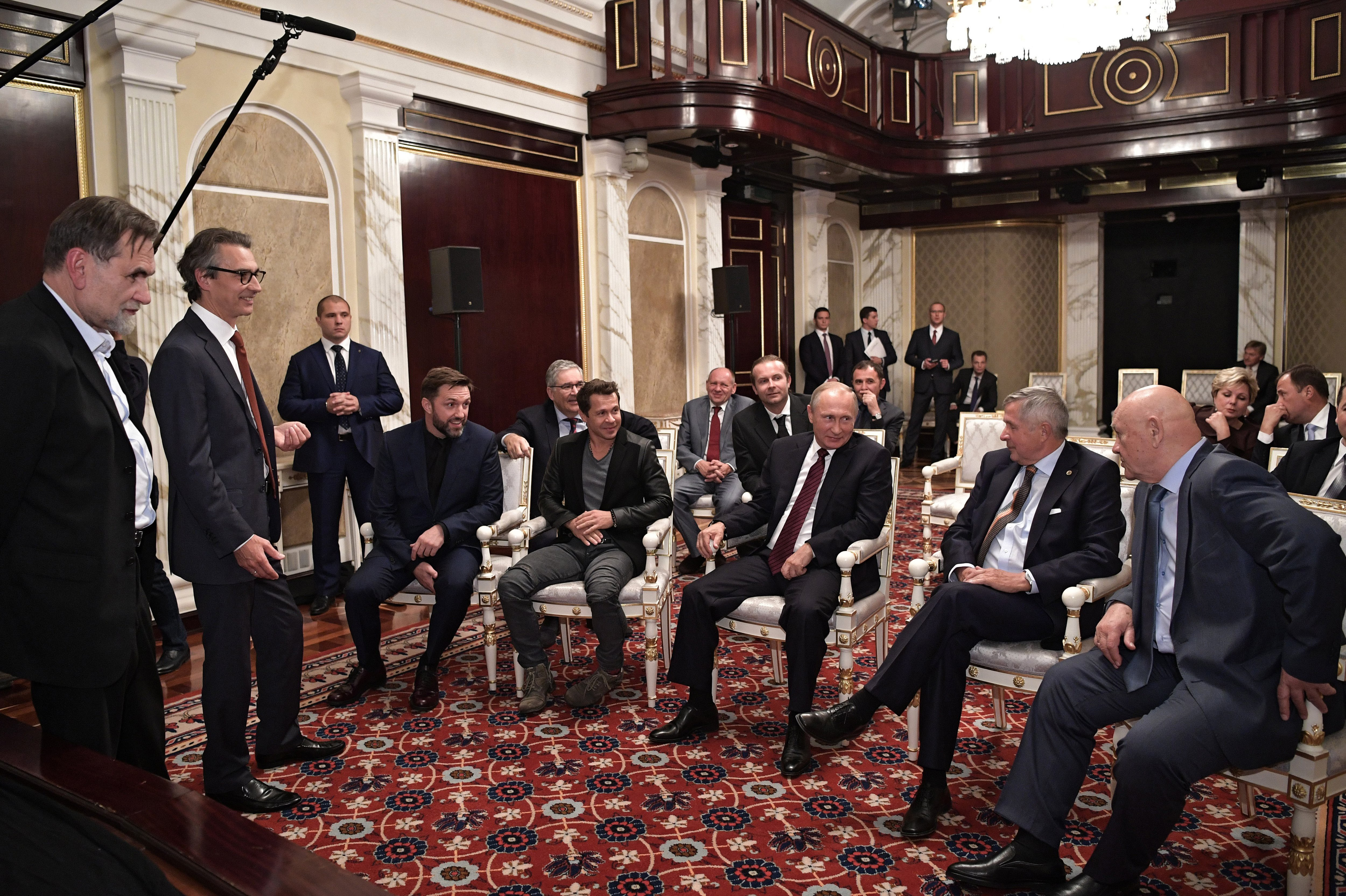
The filmmakers and prototypes of the main characters during a meeting with Vladimir Putin. October 4, 2017.

To withstand loads almost like real astronauts, the actors underwent serious physical training. Filming lasted several months with great physical exertion. The working day was 12 hours, and 90% of the shooting period was occupied by “hanging” in the so-called zero gravity. On the set, the actors moved using special cables. To understand how to move in a state of weightlessness, how the body behaves, it was necessary to feel weightlessness. In a special training, the Ilyushin Il-76 aircraft ten times rose to a height of several thousand meters and abruptly went down the parabola, while weightlessness appeared for 26 seconds.

== Soundtrack ==
The film contains several extracts of Russian songs :

- Трава у дома (Grass by the house) by Zemlyane.
- Арлекино (Harlequin) by Alla Pugacheva.
- Song of the Water Carrier by Pavel Olenev (song of the musical comedy Volga-Volga)
- Корабли (Ships) by Vladimir Vysotsky.
- Золушка (Cinderella) by Alexey Arkhipovsky.
- Нам бы выпить перед стартом... (We should have a drink before the start...) by Yuri Vizbor.

== Release ==
On July 27, 2017, a 30-minute fragment of the film was presented to residents of the city of Baikonur, employees of Roscosmos, and enterprises of the space industry of Russia.

The premiere of the full (two-hour) version of the film took place on August 18, 2017 at the opening of the V Russian short film festival “In short” in the city of Kaliningrad.

On October 4, 2017, a pre-premiere screening of the film was held in the cinema hall of the State Kremlin Palace, which became the main event of the gala evening dedicated to the 60th anniversary of the launch of the USSR's first artificial Earth satellite, Sputnik 1. After watching the film, Russian President Vladimir Putin met with the crew, having watched the film the night before. The meeting was also attended by cosmonauts Vladimir Dzhanibekov, Viktor Savinykh and Oleg Skripochka, the head of the Roscosmos by Igor Komarov and the daughter of the first cosmonaut Elena Gagarina.

The all-Russian premiere of the film took place on October 12, 2017 by Nashe Kino.

== Reception ==
Salyut 7 has an approval rating of 100% on review aggregator website Rotten Tomatoes, based on 13 reviews, and an average rating of 6.80/10.

== Technical and historical accuracy ==
Although the mission to dock with and repair Salyut-7 was extremely dangerous and challenging, the movie stretches the truth in a number of ways. There was no fire aboard Soyuz T-13 during the mission, and this seems to be the filmmakers combining the story of the later fire aboard the Mir space station in order to add more tension and drama to the film's ending. In reality, at the end of the repair and resupply mission, which took over three months (not a matter of days as the movie suggests), Soyuz T-13 undocked and re-entered Earth's atmosphere for a normal landing and recovery. Also, every Soyuz reentry takes place on land - although Soyuz craft are designed to land in water in an emergency, there was no plan to splashdown in the Indian Ocean as the English dub of the film suggests.

A central part of the film's plot is the idea that NASA was conducting a mission to recover the disabled Salyut 7 to steal Soviet secrets with Space Shuttle Challenger, returning the station to Earth inside the shuttle's cargo bay. The film ends with a fictitious scene showing Challenger rendezvousing with the Salyut 7 station and the astronauts onboard saluting the cosmonauts on Salyut 7 who were on an emergency EVA to fix the station's solar sensor. That plot possibly originates in a similar theory set forth by The Battle for Salyut: A Space Detective, a Russian documentary that was created by a media branch of Roskosmos. Jean-Loup Chrétien, who flew on both Franco-Soviet and then later Franco-American space missions, served as the inspiration for the French astronaut sent on the American mission to recover Salyut 7 in the film. Jean-Loup was indeed on the backup crew of the STS-51-G flight of Space Shuttle Discovery that was launched 11 days after the start of Soyuz T-13 on June 17, 1985. However, Jean-Loup did not fly on STS-51-G; instead, fellow French astronaut Patrick Baudry was onboard. The only launch of Challenger concurrent to Soyuz T-13 was STS-51-F, launched on July 29, 1985, well after the Soyuz T-13 crew had completed their primary emergency repairs. STS-51-I also flew concurrent to the Soyuz T-13 mission. While STS-51-F had the largest launch inclination of these three shuttle missions at 49.5 degrees, it is unlikely the Challenger would have been able to rendezvous with Salyut 7, which was at a 51.6 degree inclination.

== See also ==
- List of films featuring space stations
- Apollo 13, a 1995 docudrama film about the 1970 Apollo 13 disaster
- The Age of Pioneers, a 2017 docudrama film about Alexei Leonov's historic 1965 first spacewalk
