= Valentin Lebedev =

Soviet cosmonaut (born 1942)

- Валентин Лебедев
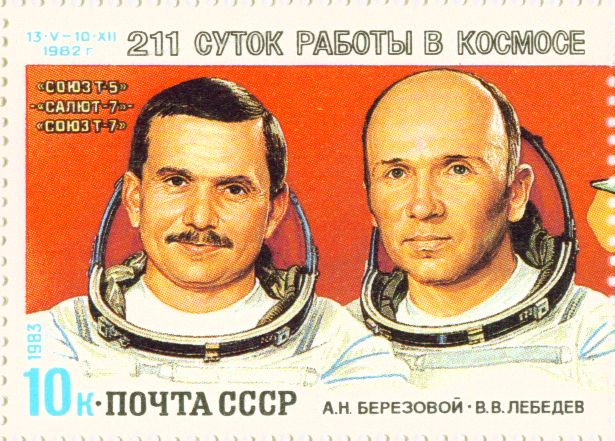
- Lebedev (right) on Soviet postage stamp
- Born: April 14, 1942 (age 84); Moscow, Russian SFSR, Soviet Union
- Occupation: Engineer
- Awards: Hero of the Soviet Union
- Space career

Cosmonaut
- Status: Retired
- Time in space: 219 days 5 hours 59 minutes
- Selection: 1965 Cosmonaut Group
- Total EVAs: 1
- Total EVA time: 2 hours 33 minutes
- Missions: Soyuz 13, Soyuz T-7/Soyuz T-5 (Salyut 7 EO-1)
- Mission insignia: Salyut

Valentin Vitalyevich Lebedev (Russian: Валентин Витальевич Лебедев; born April 14, 1942, in Moscow) is a former Soviet cosmonaut who made two flights into space. His stay aboard the Space Station Salyut 7 with Anatoly Berezovoy in 1982, which lasted 211 days, was recorded in the Guinness Book of Records.

Since 1989 Lebedev has dedicated himself to scientific work. In 1991 he started the Scientific Geoinformation Center of the Russian Academy of Science. He continues as that Center's Director through the present day.

Valentin Lebedev is a corresponding member of the Russian Academy of Sciences, Professor, and Honored Scientist of the Russian Federation.

== Education ==
After graduation from high school, Valentin Lebedev studied for a year (1960) at the Higher Air Force Navigators School in Orenburg, but he was discharged as a result of an armed forces reduction. He continued his studies at the Moscow Aviation Institute, from which he graduated in 1966.

In 1975 Lebedev defended his Ph.D. thesis on “Methods of formation of the dynamic test bench for the base service of spaceship and crew training”. In 1985 he defended his doctoral thesis on “Methods of carrying of astrophysical explorations aboard of orbital stations”.

== Career ==
=== Cosmonaut career ===
After his graduation from the Moscow Aviation Institute, Lebedev worked for 23 years at the Central Design Bureau "Energy" (SPU "Energy") of the Soviet Scientific Production Union as an engineer, senior research fellow, and a methodology instructor in the cosmonaut's detachment.

In 1967 Lebedev participated in an expedition of the Eighth Naval Squadron to locate, rescue, and rehabilitate the spaceship Zond after its landing in the Indian Ocean.

In 1968 Lebedev led the specialists in Bombay supporting Zond 5, which flew around the Moon and returned to Earth. He continued leading technical detachments in the flying, design, testing and control of the spaceship Soyuz and Soyuz T, and the orbiting space stations Salyut 4, Salyut 5, and Salyut 6.

Valentin Lebedev trained as a cosmonaut from 1971–1973, at the Yuri A. Gagarin Center for Cosmonaut Training. He earned a diploma in 1972, given the title Cosmonaut Investigator, and taken on to the cosmonaut's team ZKBEM. His first space flight was with Peter Klimuk, as a crew engineer aboard Soyuz 13, which orbited Earth from 18–26 December 1973. After this space flight, Lebedev was awarded a gold medal, "Hero of Soviet Union", the Order of Lenin, and promoted to the rank of Pilot Cosmonaut.

In 1982 Lebedev, along with Anatoly Berezovoy, spent 211 days in space (13 May – 10 December) as a crew engineer of the space station Salyut 7. During this mission Lebedev conducted more than 300 scientific experiments and studies. The 211-day flight was a record for that time, and recorded in the Guinness Book of Records. During that flight, an additional entry in to the Guinness Book of Records was filed under "First species of plant to flower in space", when his Arabidopsis flowered in July. After that space flight, Lebedev was awarded a second gold medal, "Hero of Soviet Union", and a second Order of Lenin.

In 2000 he became the first cosmonaut ever elected to the Russian Academy of Science.

Lebedev retired from the space program in 1993.

=== Scientific career ===
In the years following his second return from space, Lebedev became renowned as a specialist in the field of cosmonautics and geoinformation.

From 1989 until 1991, Valentin Lebedev worked as deputy director of science at the Institute of Geography AS USSR, completely dedicated to scientific work. At the same time he was acting director of the Geoinformation Center (GIC), which was part of this institute. In 1991 the Geoinformation Center became an independent organization: the Scientific Geoinformation Center of the Russian Academy of Science. Lebedev continued there as its director.

Under V. Lebedev's scientific leadership a unified technology was developed for the creation of maps showing the dynamics of ecosystems. This technology enabled the creation of multilayer maps of natural environments, showing changes over time. These maps were instrumental in the creation of the Ecological Geoinformaion System of the Moscow Automobile Ring Road (Russian: GIS EcoMKAD), which monitored changes in land, surface water, ground water, and flora, due to pollution created by traffic on Moscow's Ring Road.

Together with the Hydrometerological Center of Russia and IWP, as part of a federal program on Reviving the Volga River, the RAS created a new technology for predicting spring floods, based on analysis of runoff from snow blankets, the moisture content of soil (frozen during winter months), and the current state of the landscape.

One of the latest scientific projects of Lebedev and his staff, executed within a program called "Science To Moscow", is a work to remotely monitor Moscow transport traffic flow. Using original methods plus high-resolution aerial image digital processing software, the team obtained reliable data about city transport traffic volume, speed and ecological parameters of transport flow. This data became the basis for modifying street traffic and development of an automated traffic management system called "Start".

The GIS EcoMKAD developed green space for Central and Northeastern Moscow districts. It required developments to establish normalized information environment of megapolis and regions. It created the concept of unified geoinformation space for all of Russia.

=== Other Positions ===
CPSU member, 1971–present

Komsomol Central Committee member, 1974–1978

President of USSR Acrobatics Federation, 1975–1991

Member of the national Olympics committee, 1976–1991

Member, RAS President's workgroup on risk assessment and security issues

Member, United RAS Scientific Committee on Geoinformation

Member, Editorial Council, "Herald of Computer and Information Technologies" magazine

== Publications ==
Valentin Lebedev is the author of 157 scientific works; author and coauthor of nine monographs and two school textbooks for the Moscow Aviation Institute; 27 articles in “Science and Life” magazine; and a large number of publications in domestic and foreign press. Lebedev was also awarded 26 authors certificates for inventions introduced in the Soyuz and Salyut missions.

Lebedev is the author of “Diary of a Cosmonaut: 211 Days in Space”, written entirely while he was serving aboard the "space complex" "TS "Soyuz-5" - "Salyut-7" - Soyuz T-7". The book was published in both the United States (1988, 1990) and Russia, under the title “Angle of My Judgment”(1994). Extracts from the book were also published in many scientific magazines in Russia and internationally.

== Honours and awards ==
- Twice Hero of Soviet Union, (28 December 1973 and 10 December 1982)
- Pilot-Cosmonaut of the USSR
- Order "For Merit to the Fatherland 4th class" for important contributions to science development, 29 December 2007
- Two Orders of Lenin (28 December 1973 and 10 December 1982)
- Medal "For Merit in Space Exploration"
- Medal "For Construction of the Baikal-Amur Railway"
- Honoured Scientist of Russian Federation
- Officer of the Legion of Honor (France), 1982
- 10015 Valenlebedev, a main-belt asteroid named after him (MPC)
- Gold Medal of K. Tsiolkovsky by the AN USSR for outstanding achievements in the field of space, 1984
- Lebedev is an honorary citizen of 16 Russian cities, several CIS countries, the State of Texas, and the City of Fort Worth.

== Family ==
Valentin Lebedev is married to Lyudmila Vitaljevna Lebedeva (born 1943), an engineer (now retired). He has one son, Vitaly Lebedev (born 1972), who was educated as a lawyer and an economist.

Valentin Lebedev has one grandson and one granddaughter.

He lives and works in Moscow.
