= Pilot-Cosmonaut of the USSR =

Award

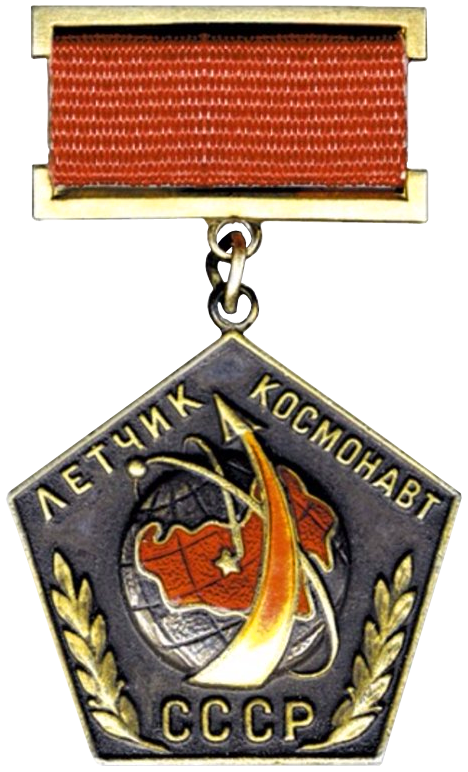
- Pilot-Cosmonaut of the USSR (obverse)
- Type: Honorary title
- Awarded for: Space flight
- Presented by: Soviet Union
- Eligibility: Soviet citizens
- Status: No longer awarded
- Established: 16 April 1961

Highlights
- Total: 72
- Related: Pilot-Cosmonaut of the Russian Federation

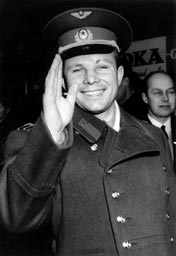
First man in space Yuri Gagarin, "Pilot-Cosmonaut of the USSR" #1 (1964 photo)

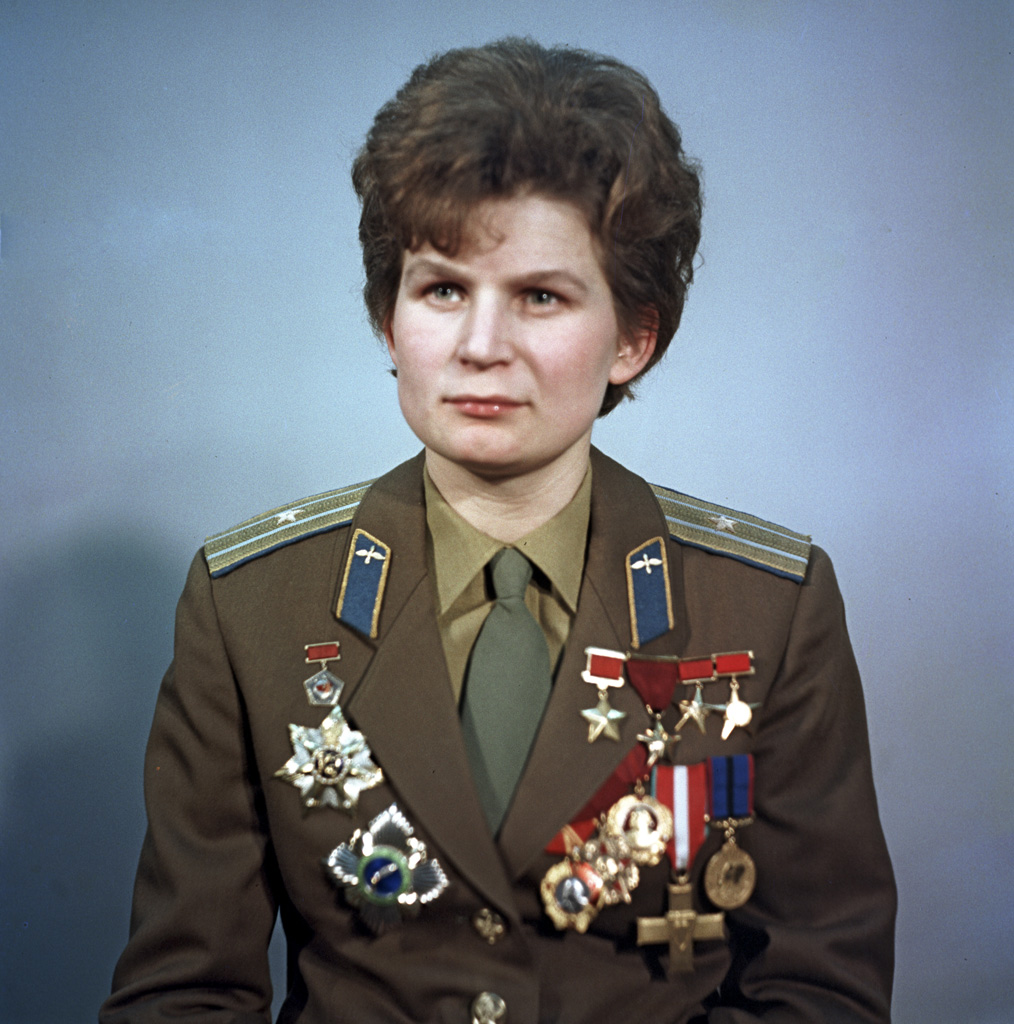
First woman in space Valentina Tereshkova, "Pilot-Cosmonaut of the USSR" #6 (1969 photo)

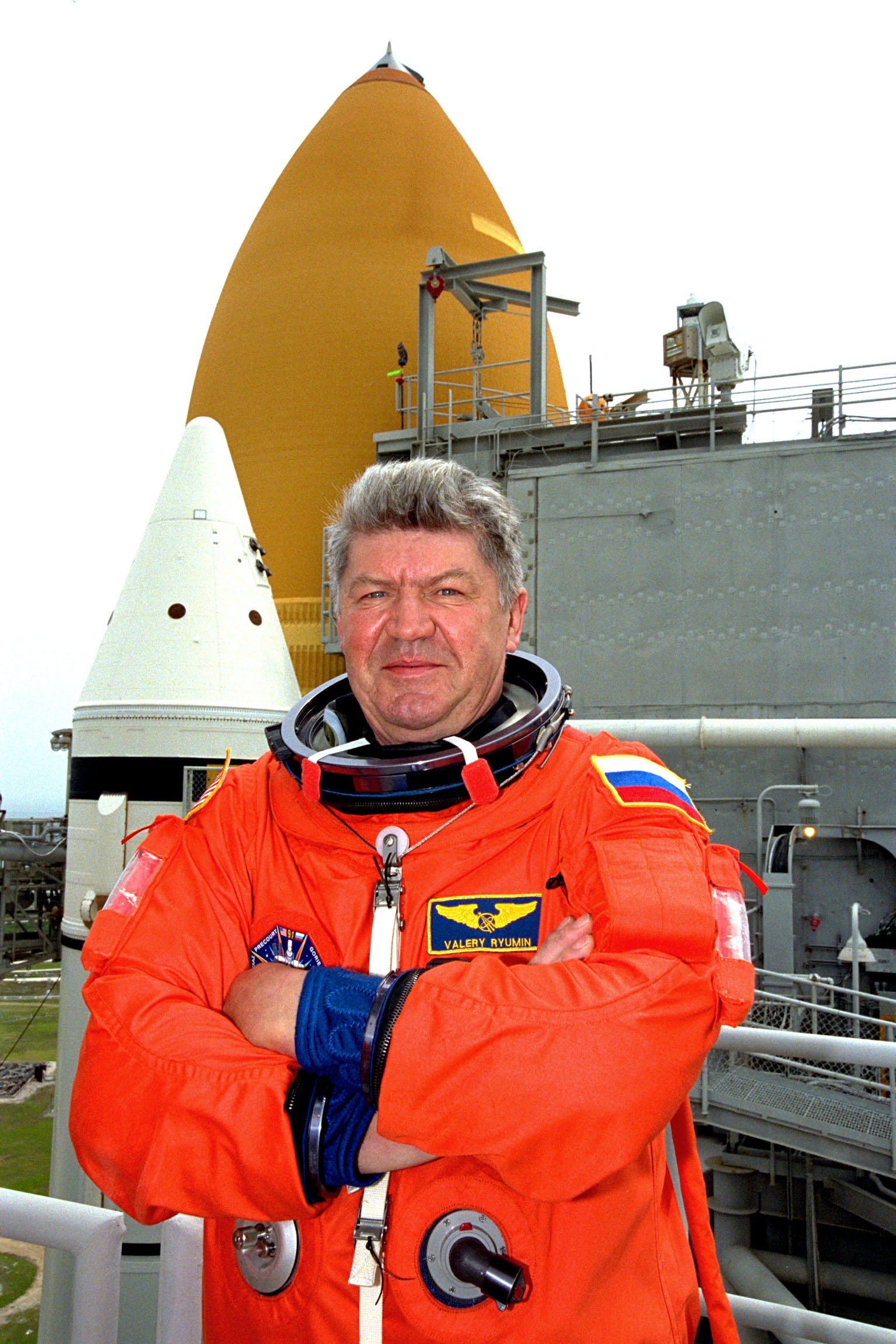
Veteran of three space flights, "Pilot-Cosmonaut of the USSR" Valery Ryumin (1998 photo)

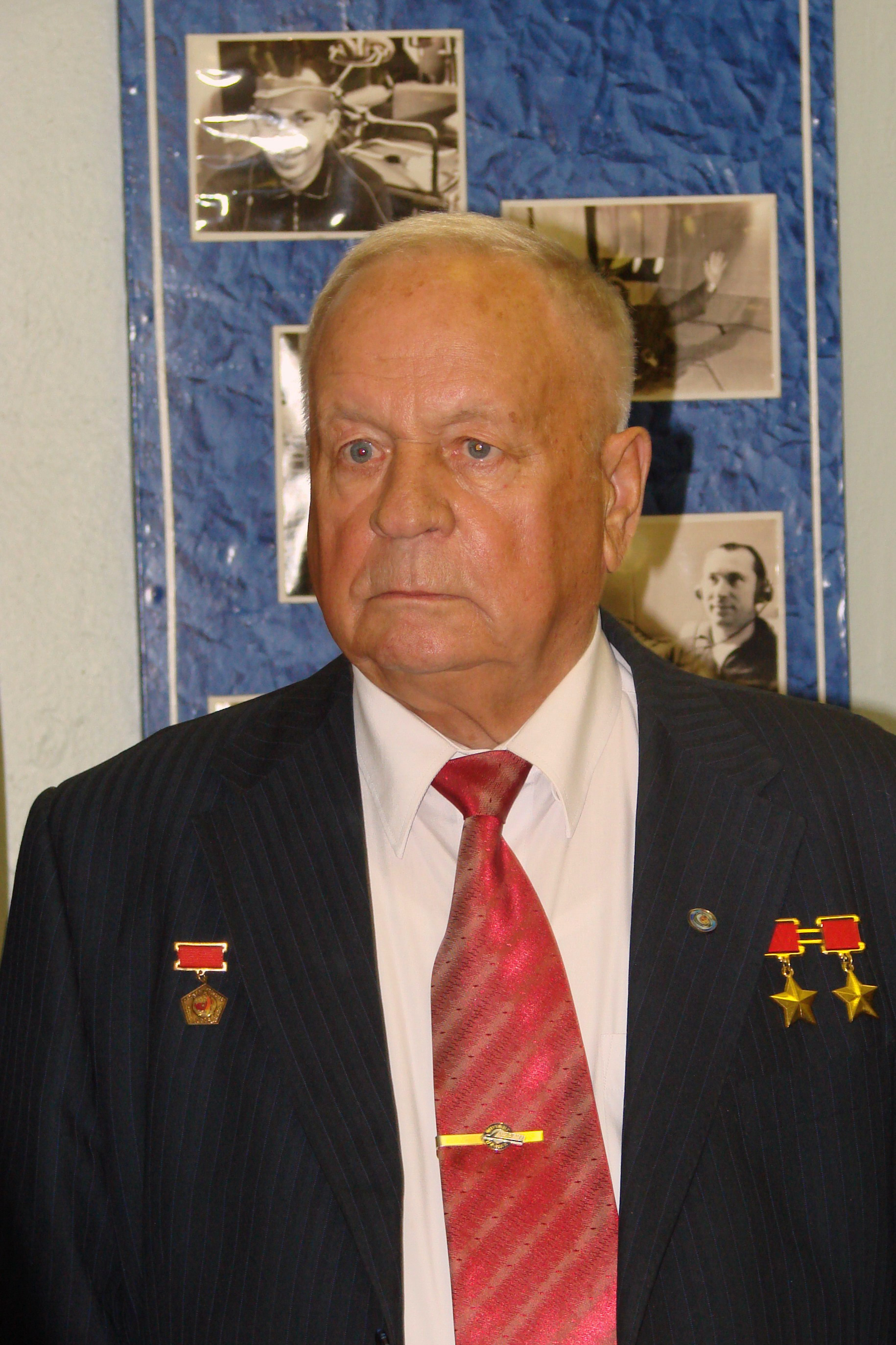
Veteran of three space flights, "Pilot-Cosmonaut of the USSR" Viktor Gorbatko (2011 photo)

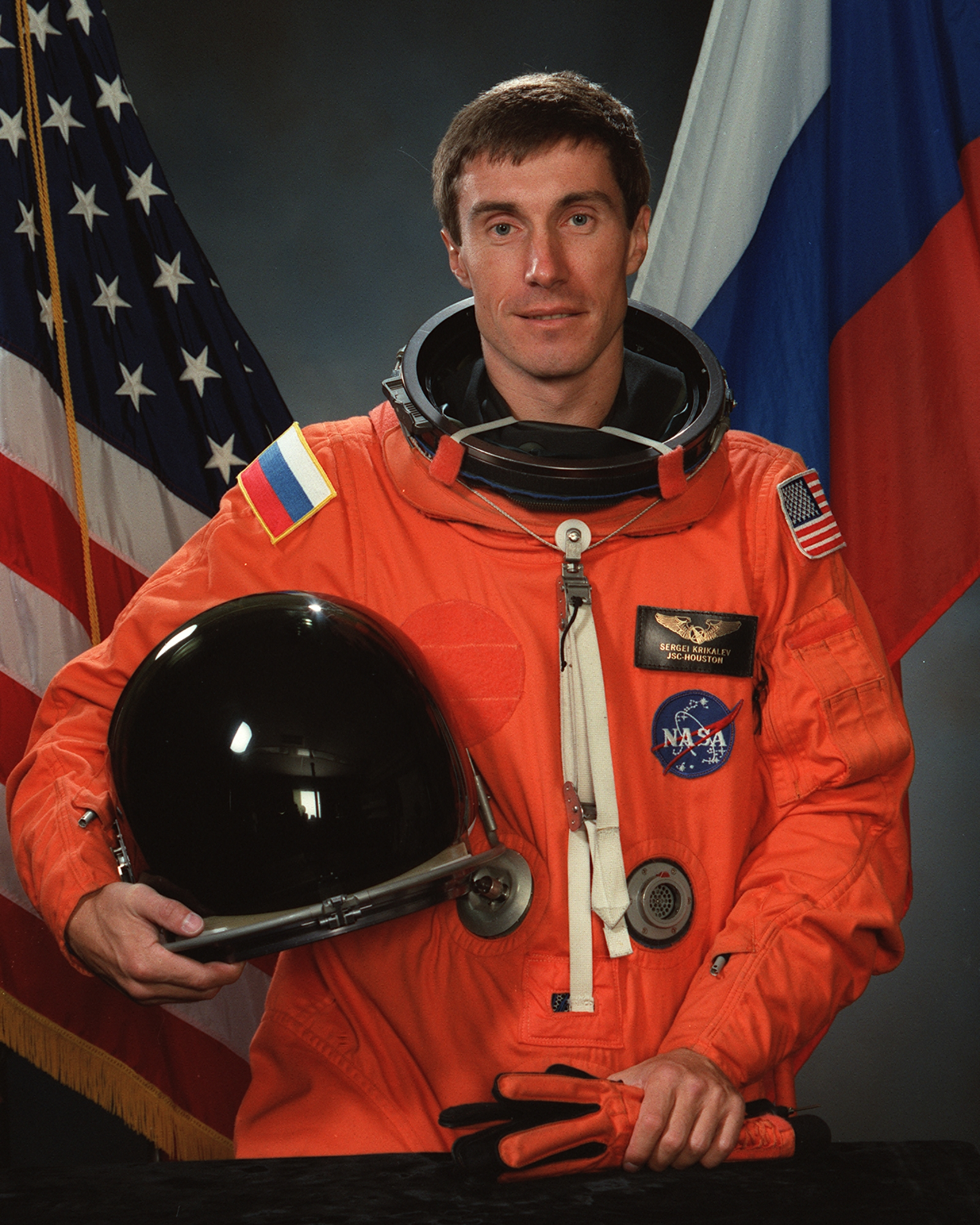
Veteran of six space flights, "Pilot-Cosmonaut of the USSR" Sergei Krikalev (2004 photo)

The honorary title Pilot-Cosmonaut of the USSR (Russian: Летчик-космонавт СССР) was a state award of the Soviet Union presented to all cosmonauts who flew for the Soviet Space Agency. Usually accompanying the distinction was the title of Hero of the Soviet Union, the highest title that could be awarded to a Soviet citizen for performing heroic deeds while in service of the state.

== History of the title ==
The title was established by Decree of the Presidium of the Supreme Soviet on 14 April 1961. It was awarded until the dissolution of the Soviet Union in 1991 where it was retained by the Law of the Russian Federation 2555-1 dated 20 March 1992 with a few slight amendments and renamed Pilot-Cosmonaut of the Russian Federation.

== Award statute ==
The title was assigned by the Presidium of the Supreme Soviet for the outstanding feat of space flight. The insignia of Pilot-Cosmonaut of the USSR is worn on the right side of the chest above orders and decorations. If worn with honorary titles of the Russian Federation, the latter have precedence.

== Award description ==
The title is a 25mm wide by 23.8mm high convex pentagon with a gilt silver rim. In the center is an image of the terrestrial globe with the territory of the Soviet Union enamelled in red. A gold star denotes Moscow as the point of origin of a gilt orbital path going around the globe once to reach a silver satellite at the upper left of the globe. A second orbital path, this time enamelled in red, starts at the bottom center of the globe going up in an arc narrowing along the way to reach a gilt spacecraft above the globe. Along the upper left edge of the pentagon above the globe, the gilt relief inscription "PILOT" (Russian: ЛЕТЧИК), along the upper right edge of the pentagon above the globe, the gilt relief inscription "COSMONAUT" (Russian: КОСМОНАВТ), along the bottom edge of the pentagon under the globe, the gilt inscription "USSR" (Russian: СССР), along the left and right lower edges of the pentagon, prominent gilt laurel branches. The reverse of the insignia is plain except for the award serial number.

The insignia is secured to a standard Russian square mount by a ring through the suspension loop. The award is secured to clothing with a threaded stud and nut behind the mount. The mount is covered by a silk moiré red ribbon.

== List of Pilot-Cosmonauts of the USSR ==
The individuals listed below have all received the honorary title "Pilot-Cosmonaut of the USSR". List is sorted by the serial number of the award.

1. 1961 — Yuri Gagarin
2. 1961 — Gherman Titov
3. 1962 — Andriyan Nikolayev
4. 1962 — Pavel Popovich
5. 1963 — Valery Bykovsky
6. 1963 — Valentina Tereshkova
7. 1964 — Vladimir Komarov
8. 1964 — Konstantin Feoktistov
9. 1964 — Boris Yegorov
10. 1965 — Pavel Belyayev
11. 1965 — Alexei Leonov
12. 1968 — Georgy Beregovoy
13. 1969 — Vladimir Shatalov
14. 1969 — Boris Volynov
15. 1969 — Aleksei Yeliseyev
16. 1969 — Yevgeny Khrunov
17. 1969 — Georgy Shonin
18. 1969 — Valeri Kubasov
19. 1969 — Anatoly Filipchenko
20. 1969 — Vladislav Volkov
21. 1969 — Viktor Gorbatko
22. 1970 — Vitaly Sevastyanov
23. 1971 — Nikolay Rukavishnikov
24. 1971 — Georgy Dobrovolsky (posthumously)
25. 1971 — Viktor Patsayev (posthumously)
26. 1973 — Vasily Lazarev
27. 1973 — Oleg Grigoryevich Makarov
28. 1973 — Pyotr Klimuk
29. 1973 — Valentin Lebedev
30. 1974 — Yury Artyukhin
31. 1974 — Gennadi Sarafanov
32. 1974 — Lev Dyomin
33. 1975 — Aleksei Gubarev
34. 1975 — Georgy Grechko
35. 1976 — Vitaly Zholobov
36. 1976 — Vladimir Aksyonov
37. 1976 — Vyacheslav Zudov
38. 1976 — Valery Rozhdestvensky
39. 1977 — Yury Glazkov
40. 1977 — Vladimir Kovalyonok
41. 1977 — Valery Ryumin
42. 1978 — Yury Romanenko
43. 1978 — Vladimir Dzhanibekov
44. 1978 — Aleksandr Ivanchenkov
45. 1979 — Vladimir Lyakhov
46. 1980 — Yury Malyshev
47. 1980 — Leonid Popov
48. 1980 — Leonid Kizim
49. 1980 — Gennadi Strekalov
50. 1981 — Viktor Savinykh
51. 1982 — Aleksandr Serebrov
52. 1982 — Svetlana Savitskaya
53. 1982 — Anatoly Berezovoy
54. 1983 — Vladimir Titov
55. 1983 — Aleksandr Pavlovich Aleksandrov
56. 1984 — Igor Volk
57. 1984 — Vladimir Solovyov
58. 1984 — Oleg Atkov
59. 1985 — Vladimir Vasyutin
60. 1985 — Aleksandr Aleksandrovich Volkov
61. 1987 — Aleksandr Viktorenko
62. 1987 — Aleksandr Laveykin
63. 1987 — Anatoli Levchenko
64. 1988 — Anatoly Solovyev
65. 1988 — Musa Manarov
66. 1989 — Sergei Krikalev
67. 1989 — Valeri Polyakov
68. 1990 — Aleksandr Nikolayevich Balandin
69. 1991 — Gennadi Manakov
70. 1991 — Viktor Mikhailovich Afanasyev
71. 1991 — Anatoly Artsebarsky
72. 1991 — Toktar Aubakirov

== See also ==
- Roscosmos Cosmonaut Corps
- Pilot-Cosmonaut of the Russian Federation
- Orders, decorations, and medals of the Soviet Union
- Badges and Decorations of the Soviet Union
- Soviet Air Force
- Soviet Space Agency
- Baikonur Cosmodrome
