= Soyuz T-15 =

1986 Soviet crewed spaceflight to Mir and Salyut 7

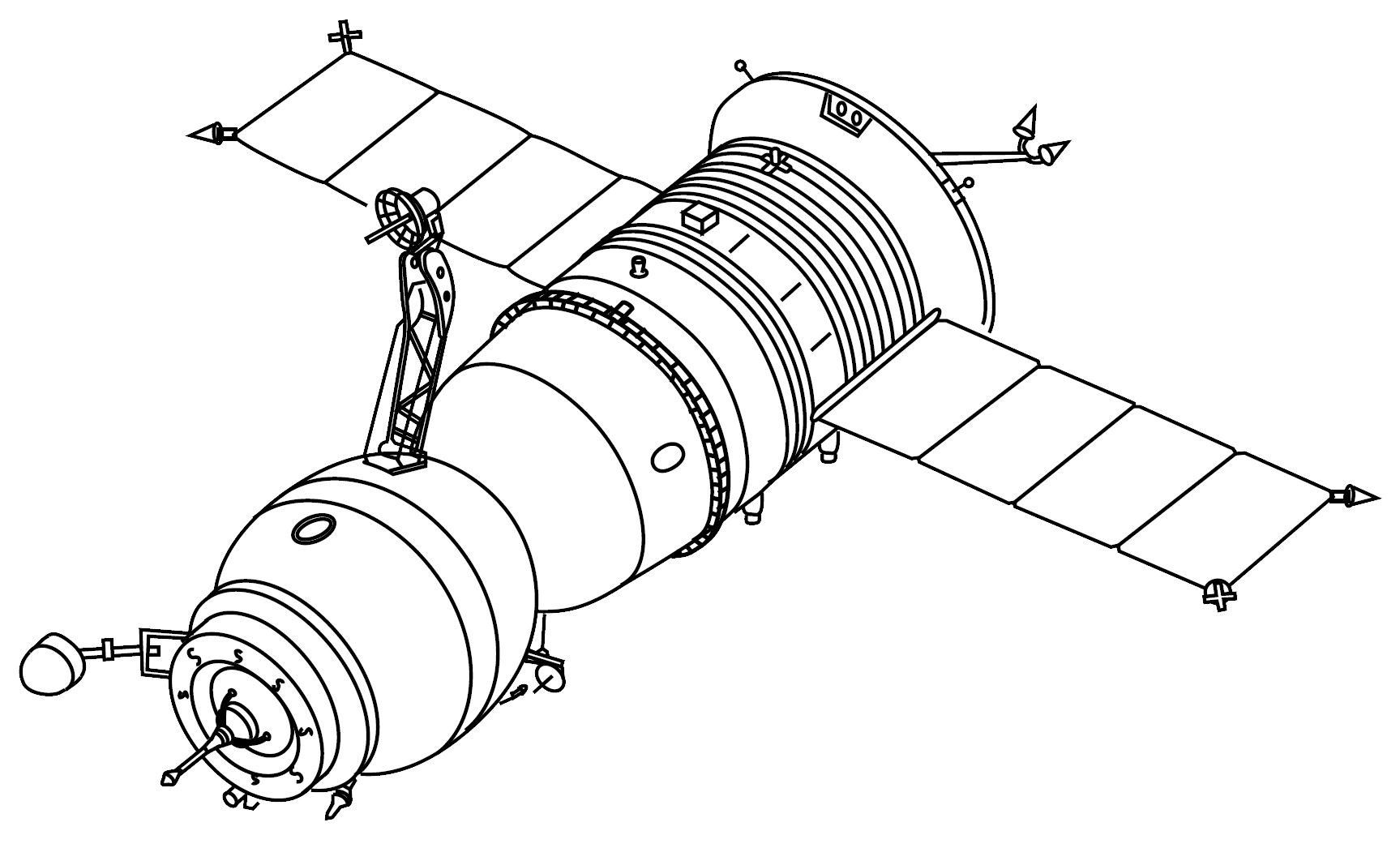
- Soyuz-T spacecraft
- COSPAR ID: 1986-022A
- SATCAT no.: 16643
- Mission duration: 125 days and 56 seconds
- Orbits completed: 1,980

Spacecraft properties
- Spacecraft: Soyuz 7K-ST No. 21L
- Spacecraft type: Soyuz-T
- Manufacturer: NPO Energia
- Launch mass: 6,850 kg (15,100 lb)

Crew
- Crew size: 2
- Members: Leonid Kizim; Vladimir Solovyov
- Callsign: Mayak (Beacon)

Start of mission
- Launch date: 12:33:09, March 13, 1986 (UTC)
- Rocket: Soyuz-U2
- Launch site: Baikonur, Site 1/5

End of mission
- Landing date: 12:34:05, July 16, 1986 (UTC)
- Landing site: 55 km (34 mi) NE of Arkalyk

Orbital parameters
- Reference system: Geocentric orbit
- Regime: Low Earth orbit
- Perigee altitude: 331 km (206 mi)
- Apogee altitude: 366 km (227 mi)
- Inclination: 51.6°
- Period: 91.5 minutes

Docking with Mir
- Docking port: Core forward
- Docking date: 15 March 1986, 13:38:42 UTC
- Undocking date: 5 May 1986, 12:12:09 UTC
- Time docked: 50 days, 22 hours, 33 minutes and 27 seconds

Docking with Salyut 7
- Docking port: Aft
- Docking date: 6 May 1986, 16:57:52 UTC
- Undocking date: 25 June 1986, 14:58:00 UTC
- Time docked: 49 days, 22 hours and 8 seconds

Docking with Mir
- Docking port: Core forward
- Docking date: 26 June 1986, 19:46:07 UTC
- Undocking date: 16 July 1986, 09:09:50 UTC
- Time docked: 19 days, 13 hours, 23 minutes and 43 seconds
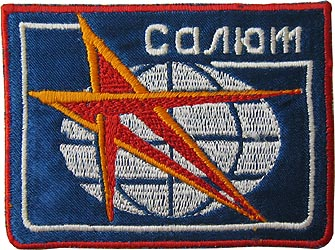
- Mission patch Soyuz programme

Soyuz T-15 (Russian: Союз T-15, Union T-15) was a crewed mission to the Mir and Salyut 7 space stations and was part of the Soyuz programme. It marked the final flight of the Soyuz-T spacecraft, the third generation Soyuz spacecraft, which had been in service for seven years from 1979 to 1986. This mission marked the first time that a spacecraft visited, and docked with, two space stations in the same mission.

== Crew ==
Position	Crew
Commander	Leonid Kizim; Third and last spaceflight
Flight engineer	Vladimir Solovyov; Second and last spaceflight

=== Backup crew ===
Position	Crew
Commander	Aleksandr Viktorenko
Flight engineer	Aleksandr Aleksandrov

== Mission parameters ==
- Mass: 6,850 kg (15,100 lb)
- Perigee: 331 km (206 mi)
- Apogee: 366 km (227 mi)
- Inclination: 51.6°
- Period: 91.5 minutes

== Mission highlights ==
Soyuz T-15 was both the first expedition to Mir and the last to Salyut 7.

=== Flight to Mir ===
Due to the pressure of launching Mir in time for the 27th Communist Party Congress, mission planners were left without the newer Soyuz-TM spacecraft or any of the planned modules to launch to the station at first. It was decided to launch an older Soyuz-T as Soyuz T-15 on a dual mission to both Mir and Salyut 7.

Leonid Kizim and Vladimir Solovyov first docked with the Mir space station on 15 March 1986 after their launch on 13 March. Plans for Mir intended that only the newer Soyuz-TM would dock with Mir's forward port, leaving the aft port free for arriving Progress spacecraft. However, the older Soyuz-T was not equipped with the Kurs approach system used on Mir's front port, but only with the older Igla approach system used for Mir's aft port. Therefore, Soyuz T-15 had to approach Mir's aft port, and then manually maneuver around the station to dock manually at the forward port. At 20 km Soyuz T-15's Igla system acquired its counterpart on Mir's aft port. At 200 meters, the Igla system was shut off, and the crew manually maneuvered around the station to dock at the front port. For this manual approach, the same laser range finder was used as for the Soyuz T-13 docking with the uncooperative Salyut 7 station in 1985.

During their nearly 55-day stay on Mir, the crew unloaded two Progress spacecraft, launched after their arrival. The mission was mostly designed to test out the new space station's systems since it had been launched with little scientific equipment, most of which would have to wait for the launch of add-on modules. Despite Mir's name literally meaning "Peace", US officials during this time accused the Soviet Union of performing military experiments on their supposedly civilian space stations. After the cosmonauts' return to Earth, Leonid Kizim in an official press conference stated that Mir was not being used for any military purposes and that "The US is accusing us of this sort of action in order to justify their own plans to extend the arms race into space." The Reagan Administration did not however reiterate these claims so as not to negatively impact the planned 1987 summit meeting between President Ronald Reagan and Soviet leader Mikhail Gorbachev.

=== The crew transfers to Salyut 7 ===
In preparation for the trip to Salyut 7, the crew loaded Soyuz T-15 with their personal belongings, plants grown on Mir, and other items. At that time Salyut 7 was still 4000 km ahead of Mir in a lower orbit in the same inclination. Therefore, on 4 May, Mir was lowered by 13 km in order to expedite the approach to Salyut 7 and conserve Soyuz T-15's limited fuel supply for the transfer. On 5 May 1986 12:12:09 UTC they undocked from Mir for their journey to Salyut 7 – at this time, the distance between the two space stations had been reduced to 2500 km due to Mir's maneuver. After a crossing of 29 hours, Soyuz T-15 docked with Salyut 7 on 6 May 16:57:52 UTC.

=== Experiments on Salyut 7 ===
The previous crew on Salyut 7, Salyut 7 EO-4, had been assigned to conduct experiments with TKS-4 (Kosmos 1686). However, commander Vladimir Vasyutin had fallen ill and the crew had to return prematurely to Earth. Therefore, they were unable to perform EVAs, which would have had implications for the Mir program. After arriving at Salyut 7, the crew of Soyuz T-15 conducted two EVAs and collected experiment results, experimental apparatuses, and samples of materials to finish the work of the previous crew.

The first EVA was on 28 May, when the crewmembers climbed outside to retrieve space exposure experiments and test the Ferma-Postroital ("girder-constructor") device. A deployment canister converted a folded girder cartridge into a 15-meter girder in only a few minutes. The girder was retracted by reversing the process at the end of the EVA. This first EVA lasted 3 hours and 50 minutes. The second EVA consisted of girder and welding experiments. On 31 May, Kizim and Solovyov attached measurement devices to the top of the retracted girder, then re-extended it with an aim toward studying its rigidity. They then used an electron gun to weld several of the girder's joints. This second EVA lasted five hours.

=== Ferry flight back to Mir ===
The crew removed 20 instruments with a total mass of 350 to 400 kg from Salyut 7 before returning to Mir. Mir maneuvered twice again between 24 and 25 June, raising its orbit slightly and moving closer to Salyut 7. On 25 June, Soyuz T-15 undocked from Salyut 7 to begin their 29-hour journey back to Mir, to which they returned on 25–26 June.

On 3 July, Kizim surpassed Valeri Ryumin's record for time spent in space. On 6 July, he became the first human to have spent a full year in space. The crew spent their last 20 days on Mir conducting Earth observations.

Meanwhile, between 19 and 22 August, engines on Kosmos 1686 boosted Salyut 7 to a record-high mean orbital altitude of 475 km to forestall reentry. Atmospheric drag took its toll, however, and the station reentered over South America 55 months later. Pieces of Salyut 7 and Kosmos 1686 were found in Argentina.

Soyuz T-15 was the last mission to use the Soyuz-T spacecraft, due to its replacement by the Soyuz-TM.

== See also ==
- Soyuz T-13, a mission to manually dock to the crippled Salyut 7 space station, which used similar techniques practiced by the Soyuz T-15 crew in their approach to Mir.
