= Pilot-Cosmonaut of the Russian Federation =

Honorary Title Pilot-Cosmonaut of the Russian Federation
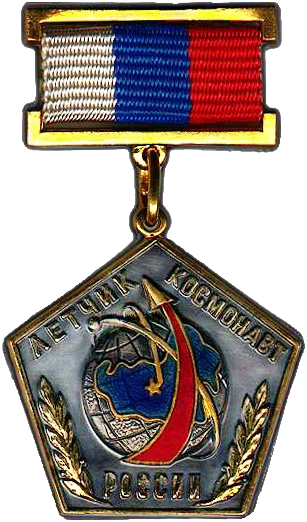
- Pilot-Cosmonaut of the Russian Federation (obverse)
- Type: Honorary Title
- Awarded for: Space flight
- Presented by: Russian Federation
- Eligibility: Russian citizens
- Status: Active
- Established: March 20, 1992

Highlights
- Total: 52
- Related: Pilot-Cosmonaut of the USSR

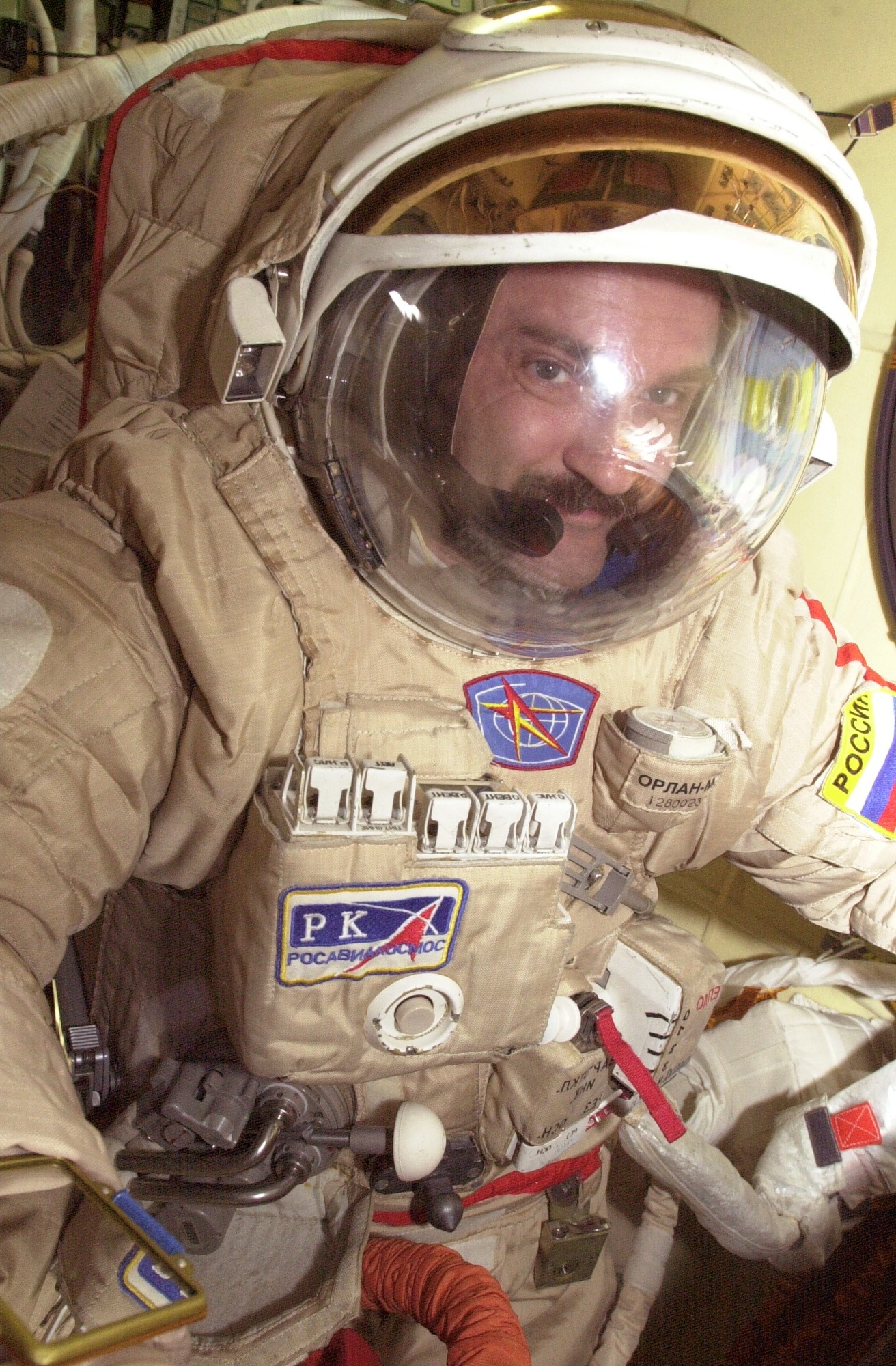
Pilot-Cosmonaut of the Russian Federation Aleksandr Yurievich Kaleri

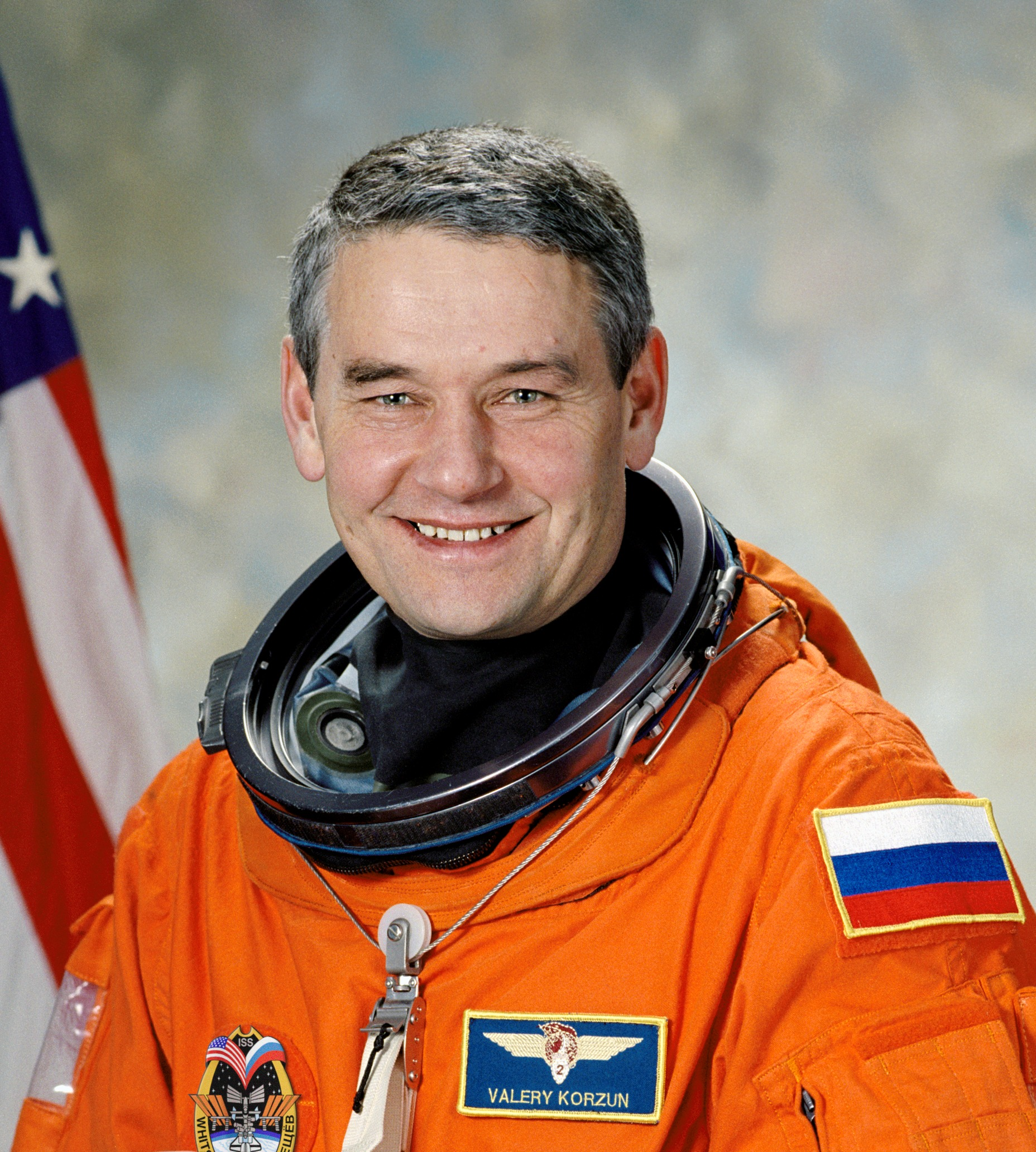
Pilot-Cosmonaut of the Russian Federation Valery Grigoryevich Korzun

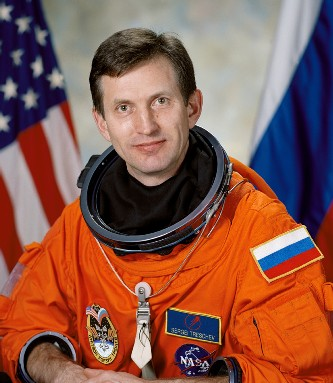
Pilot-Cosmonaut of the Russian Federation Sergei Yevgenyevich Treshchov

The Honorary Title Pilot-Cosmonaut of the Russian Federation (Russian: Летчик-космонавт Российской Федерации) is a state award of the Russian Federation presented to all cosmonauts who fly for the Russian Federal Space Agency. Usually accompanying the distinction is the title of Hero of the Russian Federation, the highest title that can be awarded to a Russian for performing heroic deeds while in service of the state.

== History of the title ==
The Honorary Title of Pilot-Cosmonaut was originally established by Decree of the Presidium of the Supreme Soviet on April 14, 1961, it was then called Pilot-Cosmonaut of the USSR (Russian: Летчик-космонавт СССР). Following the dissolution of the Soviet Union in 1991, the title was retained by the Law of the Russian Federation 2555-1 dated March 20, 1992 and the title was renamed Pilot-Cosmonaut of the Russian Federation.

== Award statute ==
The Honorary Title "Pilot-Cosmonaut of the Russian Federation" is assigned by the president of the Russian Federation for the outstanding feat of space flight. The insignia of Pilot-Cosmonaut of the Russian Federation is worn on the right side of the chest above orders and decorations.

== Award description ==
The Honorary Title "Pilot-Cosmonaut of the Russian Federation" is a 25mm wide by 23.8mm high convex pentagon with a gilt silver rim. In the center is an image of the terrestrial globe with the territory of the Russian Federation enamelled in blue. A gold star denotes Moscow as the point of origin of a gilt orbital path going around the globe once to reach a silver satellite at the upper left of the globe. A second orbital path, this time enamelled in red, starts at the bottom center of the globe going up in an arc narrowing along the way to reach a gilt spacecraft above the globe. Along the upper left edge of the pentagon above the globe, the gilt relief inscription "PILOT" (Russian: ЛЕТЧИК), along the upper right edge of the pentagon above the globe, the gilt relief inscription "COSMONAUT" (Russian: КОСМОНАВТ), along the bottom edge of the pentagon under the globe, the gilt inscription "RUSSIA" (Russian: РОССИИ, lit. 'of Russia'), along the left and right lower edges of the pentagon, prominent gilt laurel branches. The reverse of the insignia is plain except for the award serial number.

The insignia is secured to a standard Russian square mount by a ring through the suspension loop. The mount is covered by a silk moiré tricolour ribbon of white, blue and red.

== List of recipients ==
The individuals listed below have all received the Honorary Title of Pilot-Cosmonaut of the Russian Federation:

1. August 11, 1992, Decree no. 871 — Aleksandr Yurievich Kaleri
2. February 5, 1993, Decree no. 181 — Sergei Vasilyevich Avdeev
3. July 23, 1993, Decree no. 1060 — Aleksandr Fedorovich Poleshchuk
4. January 14, 1994, Decree no. 154 — Vasili Vasilyevich Tsibliev
5. August 18, 1994, Decree no. 1697 — Yuri Vladimirovich Usachev
6. November 24, 1994, Decree no. 2107 — Yuri Ivanovich Malenchenko
7. November 24, 1994, Decree no. 2107 — Talgat Amangeldyuly Musabayev
8. April 10, 1995, Decree no. 338 — Elena Vladimirovna Kondakova
9. September 7, 1995, Decree no. 907 — Vladimir Nikolaevich Dezhurov
10. October 5, 1995 Decreo no. 1017 — Nikolai Mikhailovich Budarin
11. April 1, 1996, Decree no. 447 — Yuri Pavlovich Gidzenko
12. October 16, 1996, Decree no. 1443 — Yuri Ivanovich Onufrienko
13. April 11, 1997, Decree no. 342 — Valeri Grigorievich Korzun
14. April 10, 1998, Decree no. 370 — Aleksandr Ivanovich Lazutkin
15. April 10, 1998, Decree no. 372 — Pavel Vladimirovich Vinogradov
16. April 10, 1998, Decree no. 372 — Salizhan Shakirovich Sharipov
17. December 25, 1998, Decree no. 1640 — Yuri Mikhailovich Baturin
18. April 5, 1999, Decree no. 428 — Gennadi Ivanovich Padalka
19. September 10, 1999, Decree no. 1211 — Valeri Ivanovich Tokarev
20. November 9, 2000, Decree no. 1858 — Sergei Viktorovich Zalyotin
21. April 9, 2001, Decree no. 408 — Boris Vladimirovich Morukov
22. April 10, 2002, Decree no. 367 — Konstantin Mirovich Kozeev
23. October 10, 2002, Decree no. 1145 (unpublished) — Yuri Valentinovich Lonchakov
24. April 12, 2003, Decree no. 420 — Mikhail Vladislavovich Tyurin
25. September 21, 2003, Decree no. 1082 — Fyodor Nikolaevich Yurchikhin
26. February 4, 2004, Decree no. 140 — Sergei Yevgenyevich Treshchov
27. February 23, 2005, Decree no. 206 (unpublished) — Yuri Georgiyevich Shargin
28. Oleg Valeryevich Kotov
29. February 5, 2009, (unpublished) — Sergey Alexandrovich Volkov
30. February 5, 2009, (unpublished) — Oleg Dmitriyevich Kononenko
31. April 12, 2010, Decree no. 449 — Roman Yurievich Romanenko
32. October 30, 2010, Decree no. 1310 — Maksim Viktorovich Surayev
33. April 12, 2011, Decree no. 432 — Oleg Ivanovich Skripochka
34. April 12, 2011, Decree no. 433 — Mikhail Borisovich Korniyenko
35. April 12, 2011, Decree no. 433 — Aleksandr Aleksandrovich Skvortsov
36. March 3, 2012, Decree no. 270 — Dmitri Yuryevich Kondratyev
37. June 25, 2012, Decree no. 904 — Andrei Ivanovich Borisenko
38. June 25, 2012, Decree no. 904 — Aleksandr Mikhailovich Samokutyayev
39. Awarded December 25, 2013 — Anatoli Ivanishin
40. Awarded December 25, 2013 — Anton Shkaplerov
41. May 28, 2014, Decree no. 374 — Oleg Novitskiy
42. May 28, 2014, Decree no. 374 — Sergei Revin
43. May 28, 2014, Decree no. 374 — Evgeny Tarelkin

== See also ==
- Roscosmos Cosmonaut Corps
- Pilot-Cosmonaut of the USSR
- Honorary titles of Russia
- Awards and decorations of the Russian Federation
- Russian Federal Space Agency
- Baikonur Cosmodrome
- Astronaut badge
