= Aleksandr Serebrov =

Soviet and Russian cosmonaut (1944–2013)

- Александр Серебров
- Born: 15 February 1944; Moscow, USSR
- Died: 12 November 2013 (aged 69); Moscow, Russia
- Occupation: Flight engineer
- Space career

Roscosmos cosmonaut
- Time in space: 372d 22h 52m
- Selection: 1978 Intercosmos Group
- Total EVAs: 10 (5 during Mir EO-5, 5 during EO-14)
- Total EVA time: 31h, 40m
- Missions: Soyuz T-7/Soyuz T-5 (Salyut 7 EP-2), Soyuz T-8 (failed docking to Salyut 7), Soyuz TM-8 (Mir EO-5), Soyuz TM-17 (Mir EO-14)

Aleksandr Aleksandrovich Serebrov (Russian: Алекса́ндр Алекса́ндрович Серебро́в, 15 February 1944 – 12 November 2013) was a Soviet cosmonaut. He graduated from Moscow Institute of Physics and Technology (1967), and was selected as a cosmonaut on 1 December 1978. He retired on 10 May 1995. He was married and had one child.

Serebrov flew on Soyuz T-7, Soyuz T-8, Soyuz TM-8, and Soyuz TM-17. He was one of very few cosmonauts to fly for both the Soviet Union and the Russian Federation that followed it. He held the record for most spacewalks, 10, until Anatoly Solovyev surpassed it. In all, he spent 371.95 days in space. Serebrov contributed to the design of Salyut 6, Salyut 7, and the Mir space stations. He helped design, and, according to a New York Times obituary, "was the first to test a one-person vehicle - popularly called a space motorcycle - to rescue space crews in distress and repair satellites." This vehicle, known as Icarus, was tested in February 1990, and remained onboard Mir for several years but was never used after that.

Serebrov died suddenly in Moscow on 12 November 2013, aged 69, and was buried on November 15 at Ostankinsky cemetery.

He is also known for playing Tetris on a Game Boy in the spacecraft, making it the first time a video game has ever been played in space.

== Awards and honors ==
- Title of Hero of the Soviet Union
- Title of Pilot-Cosmonaut of the USSR
- Order of Friendship of Peoples
- Two Orders of Lenin
- Order of the October Revolution
- Medal "For Merit in Space Exploration" (Russian Federation)
- Officer of the Legion of Honour (France)

Asteroid 365375 Serebrov, discovered by Timur Kryachko in 2009, was named in his memory. The official naming citation was published by the Minor Planet Center on 8 November 2019 (M.P.C. 118221).
