= Leonid Popov =

Soviet cosmonaut (born 1945)

- Леонид Попов; Леонід Попов
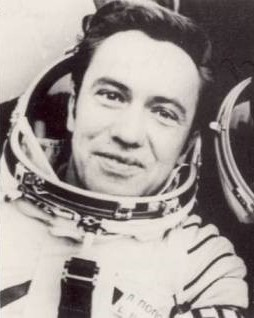
- Born: August 31, 1945 (age 81); Oleksandriia, Ukrainian SSR, USSR
- Occupation: Pilot
- Awards: Hero of the Soviet Union (2)
- Space career

Cosmonaut
- Status: Retired
- Rank: Major General, Soviet Air Force
- Time in space: 200d 14h 45m
- Selection: Air Force Group 5
- Missions: Soyuz 35/Soyuz 37, Soyuz 40, Soyuz T-7/Soyuz T-5

Leonid Ivanovich Popov (Russian: Леони́д Ива́нович Попо́в, Ukrainian: Леонід Іванович Попо́в; born August 31, 1945) is a former Soviet cosmonaut.

== Biography ==
Popov was born in Oleksandriia, Kirovohrad Oblast, Ukrainian SSR. He was selected as a cosmonaut on April 27, 1970, and flew as Commander on Soyuz 35, Soyuz 40 and Soyuz T-7, logging 200 days, 14 hours, and 45 minutes in space before his retirement on June 13, 1987. Popov is married and has two children.

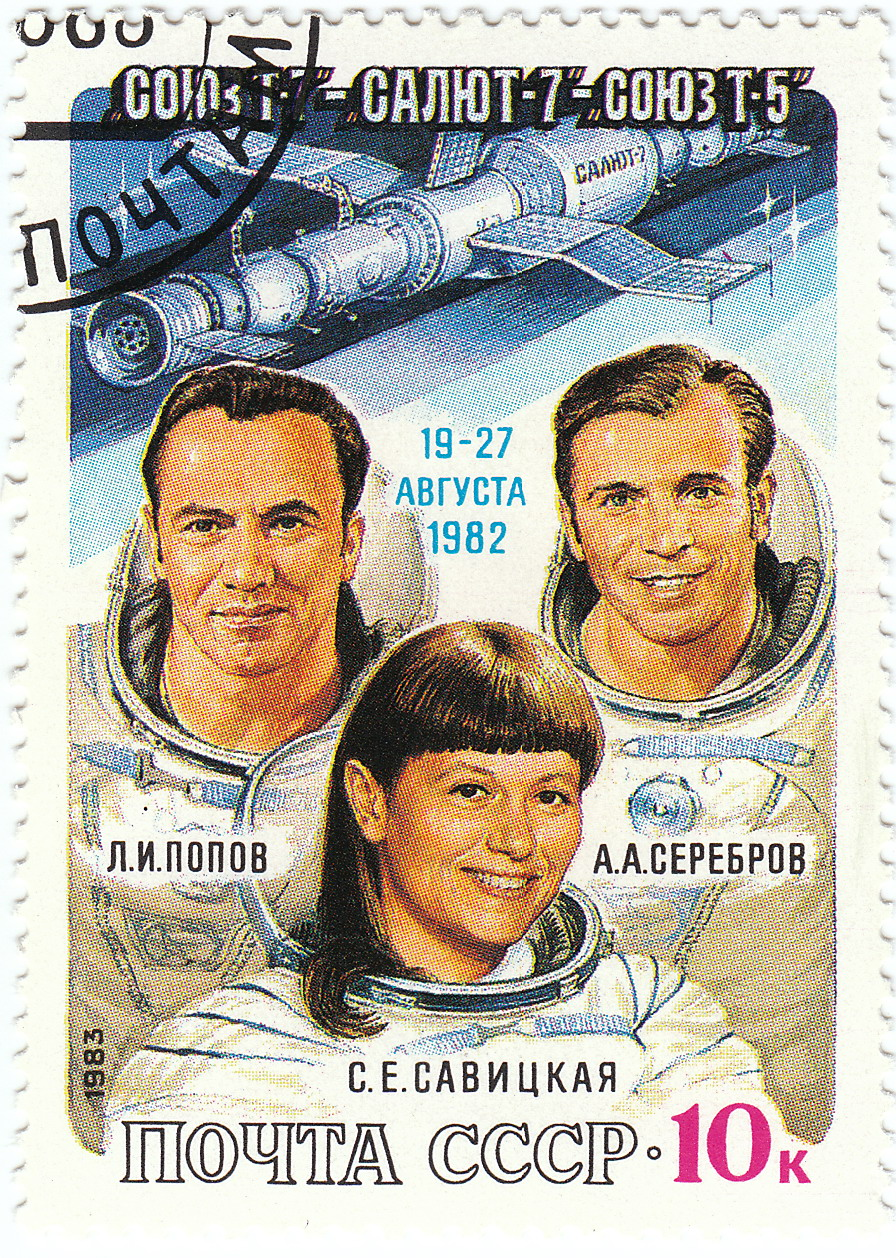
Leonid Popov, Aleksandr Serebrov and Svetlana Savitskaya

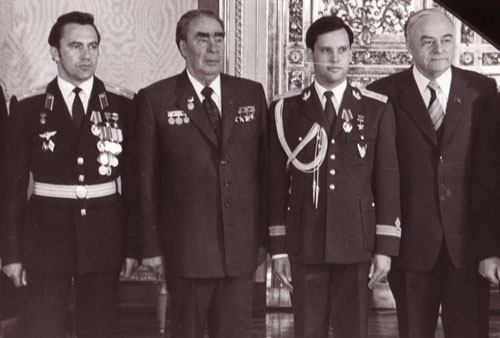
Leonid Popov and Dumitru Prunariu with Leonid Brezhnev in 1981

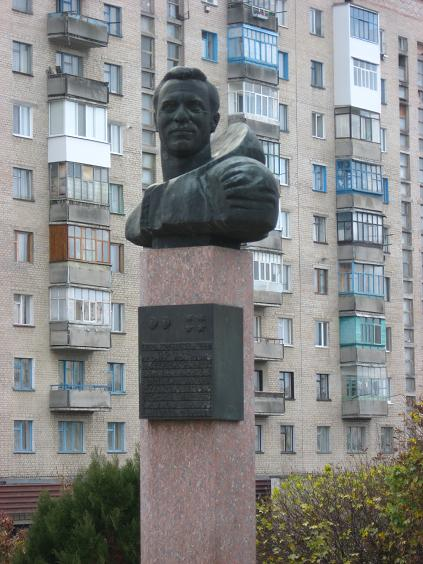
Memorial in Olexandria

He was awarded:

- Twice Hero of the Soviet Union;
- Three Orders of Lenin;
- Medal "For Merit in Space Exploration" (Russian Federation);
- Pilot-Cosmonaut of the USSR;
- Honoured Master of Sport.

Foreign awards:

- Hero of the Socialist Republic of Romania;
- Hero of the Republic of Cuba
- Hero of Socialist Labour (Vietnam);
- Order of Ho Chi Minh (Vietnam).

In September 2023, as part of the national campaigns of decommunization and derusification, in Kropyvnytskyi (the regional capital of Kirovohrad Oblast) the Cosmonaut Popov Street was renamed to Independence Street.
