= Anatoly Berezovoy =

Soviet cosmonaut (1942–2014)

- Анатолий Березовой
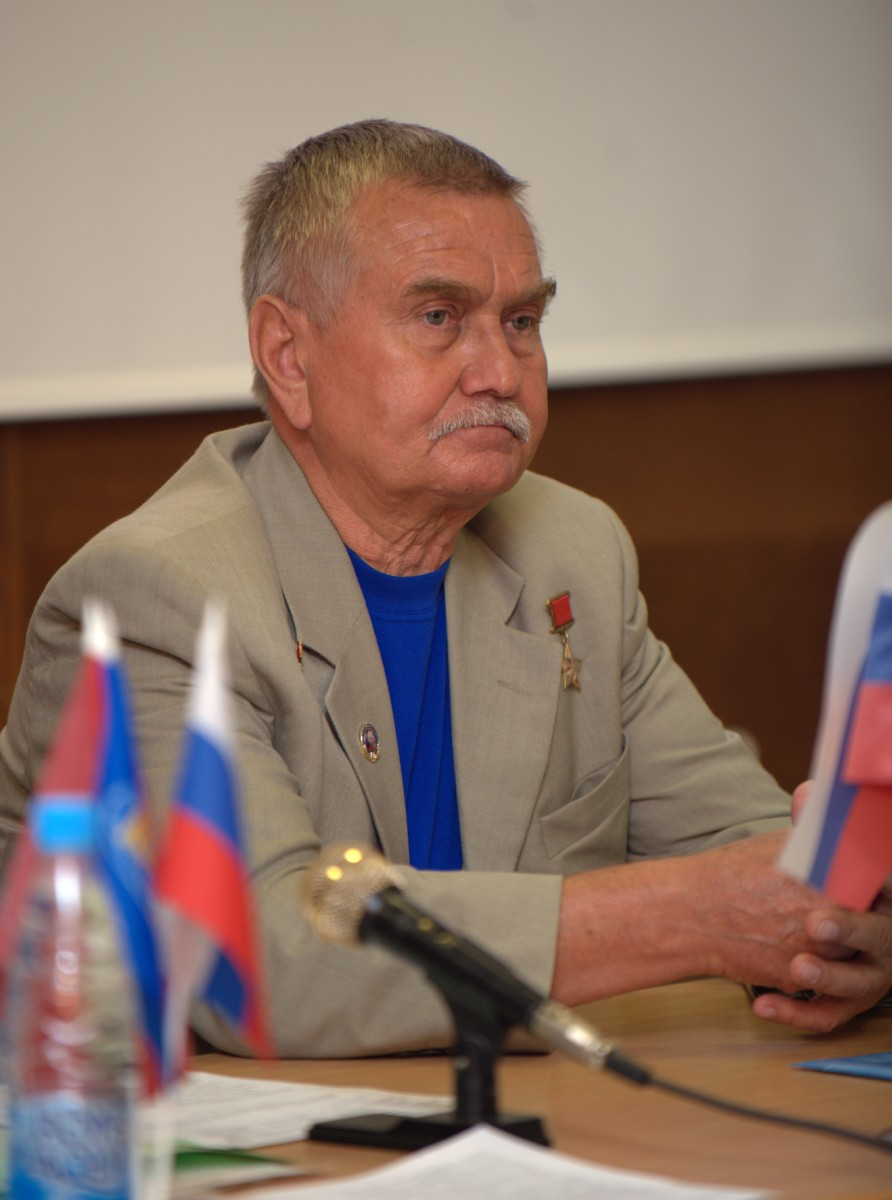
- Born: 11 April 1942; Enem, RSFSR, USSR
- Died: 20 September 2014 (aged 72); Moscow, Russia
- Occupation: Pilot
- Awards: Hero of the Soviet Union
- Space career

Cosmonaut
- Rank: Colonel, Soviet Air Force
- Time in space: 211 days 09 hours 04 minutes
- Selection: Air Force Group 5
- Total EVAs: 1
- Total EVA time: 2 hours 33 minutes
- Missions: Soyuz T-5\Soyuz T-7 (Salyut 7 EO-1)

Anatoly Nikolayevich Berezovoy (Russian: Анато́лий Никола́евич Березово́й; 11 April 1942 – 20 September 2014) was a Soviet and later Russian cosmonaut.

== Biography ==
Berezovoy was born in Enem, Adyghe Autonomous Oblast, Russian SFSR in a Ukrainian family. He was married with two children and graduated from the Air Force Academy.

On 27 April 1970 he was selected as a cosmonaut. In 1982 he flew as Commander on Soyuz T-5 on the first mission to the Salyut 7 space station, returning to Earth on the Soyuz T-7 after 211 days 9 hours. He retired on 31 October 1992 due to age. From 1992 to 1999, he was a Deputy President of Russian Space Federation.

== Honours and awards ==
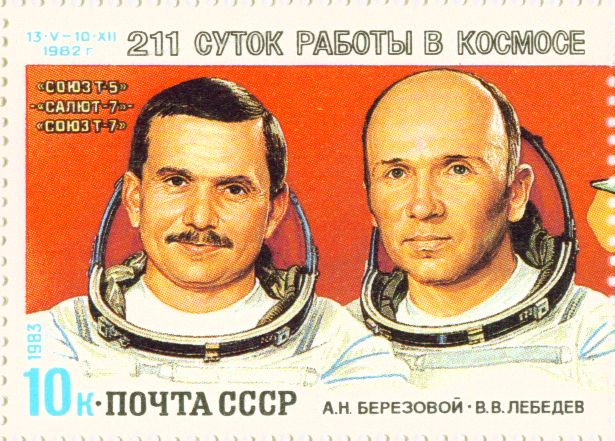
Anatoly Berezovoy and Valentin Lebedev on a 1983 Soviet stamp "211 days of working in space"

- Hero of the Soviet Union
- Pilot-Cosmonaut of the USSR
- Order of Lenin
- Order for Service to the Homeland in the Armed Forces of the USSR 3rd class
- Medal "For Merit in Space Exploration" (Russian Federation)
- Officer of the Legion of Honour (France)
- Order "The Sun of Freedom" (Afghanistan)
- Kirti Chakra (India)
