= List of human spaceflights, 1981–1990 =

This is a detailed list of human spaceflights from 1981 to 1990, spanning the end of the Soviet Union's Salyut space station program, the beginning of Mir, and the start of the US Space Shuttle program.

- Red indicates fatalities.
- Green indicates suborbital flights (including flights that failed to attain intended orbit).

#	Crew	Launch spacecraft	Habitation	Return spacecraft	Brief mission summary
80	(Soviet Union) Vladimir Kovalyonok (3) (Soviet Union) Viktor Savinykh (1)	13 March 1981 (Soviet Union) Soyuz T-4	Salyut 6	26 May 1981 (Soviet Union) Soyuz T-4	
81	(Soviet Union) Vladimir Dzhanibekov (2) (Mongolia) Jügderdemidiin Gürragchaa	22 March 1981 (Soviet Union) Soyuz 39	Salyut 6	29 March 1981 (Soviet Union) Soyuz 39	First Mongolian in space (Gürragchaa).
82	(United States) John W. Young (5) (United States) Robert L. Crippen (1)	12 April 1981 (United States) STS-1, Columbia		14 April 1981 (United States) STS-1, Columbia	First Space Shuttle flight. Systems test.
83	(Soviet Union) Leonid Popov (2) (Romania) Dumitru Prunariu	14 May 1981 (Soviet Union) Soyuz 40	Salyut 6	22 May 1981 (Soviet Union) Soyuz 40	First Romanian in space (Prunariu). Magnetic field observations. Final Soyuz flight.
84	(United States) Joseph H. Engle (1) (United States) Richard H. Truly (1)	12 November 1981 (United States) STS-2, Columbia		14 November 1981 (United States) STS-2, Columbia	First re-use of a crewed orbital spacecraft. Systems test. Earth science observations.
85	(United States) Jack R. Lousma (2) (United States) C. Gordon Fullerton (1)	22 March 1982 (United States) STS-3, Columbia		30 March 1982 (United States) STS-3, Columbia	Further system testing. Miscellaneous scientific experiments and Earth science observations.
86	(Soviet Union) Anatoli Berezovoy (Soviet Union) Valentin Lebedev (2)	12 May 1982 (Soviet Union) Soyuz T-5	Salyut 7	10 December 1982 (Soviet Union) Soyuz T-7	First mission to Salyut 7. Deployment of radio communications satellite.
87	(Soviet Union) Vladimir Dzhanibekov (3) (Soviet Union) Aleksandr Ivanchenkov (2) (France) Jean-Loup Chrétien (1)	24 June 1982 (Soviet Union) Soyuz T-6	Salyut 7	2 July 1982 (Soviet Union) Soyuz T-6	First French citizen in space (Chrétien).
88	(United States) Thomas K. Mattingly (2) (United States) Henry W. Hartsfield (1)	27 June 1982 (United States) STS-4, Columbia		4 July 1982 (United States) STS-4, Columbia	Final Space Shuttle R&D flight. Miscellaneous scientific experiments plus classified US Air Force payload.
89	(Soviet Union) Leonid Popov (3) (Soviet Union) Aleksandr Serebrov (1) (Soviet Union) Svetlana Savitskaya (1)	19 August 1982 (Soviet Union) Soyuz T-7	Salyut 7	27 August 1982 (Soviet Union) Soyuz T-5	Second woman in space (Savitskaya).
90	(United States) Vance D. Brand (2) (United States) Robert F. Overmyer (1) (United States) Joseph P. Allen (1) (United States) William B. Lenoir	11 November 1982 (United States) STS-5, Columbia		16 November 1982 (United States) STS-5, Columbia	Launched commercial ANIK C-3 and SBS-C communications satellites. Planned EVA cancelled due to space suit malfunction.
91	(United States) Paul J. Weitz (2) (United States) Karol J. Bobko (1) (United States) Donald H. Peterson (United States) F. Story Musgrave (1)	4 April 1983 (United States) STS-6, Challenger		9 April 1983 (United States) STS-6, Challenger	First Space Shuttle EVA (Peterson and Musgrave). Deployment of first Tracking and Data Relay Satellite (TDRS-1). Miscellaneous science experiments.
92	(Soviet Union) Vladimir Titov (1) (Soviet Union) Gennadi Strekalov (2) (Soviet Union) Aleksandr Serebrov (2)	20 April 1983 (Soviet Union) Soyuz T-8		22 April 1983 (Soviet Union) Soyuz T-8	Failed to dock with Salyut 7.
93	(United States) Robert L. Crippen (2) (United States) Frederick H. Hauck (1) (United States) John M. Fabian (1) (United States) Sally K. Ride (1) (United States) Norman E. Thagard (1)	18 June 1983 (United States) STS-7, Challenger		24 June 1983 (United States) STS-7, Challenger	Two communications satellites launched. First American woman in space (Ride). Investigation into behavior of ant colony in zero gravity. Various microgravity experiments.
94	(Soviet Union) Vladimir Lyakhov (2) (Soviet Union) Aleksandr Aleksandrov (1)	26 June 1983 (Soviet Union) Soyuz T-9	Salyut 7	23 November 1983 (Soviet Union) Soyuz T-9	
95	(United States) Richard H. Truly (2) (United States) Daniel C. Brandenstein (1) (United States) Dale A. Gardner (1) (United States) Guion Bluford (1) (United States) William E. Thornton (1)	30 August 1983 (United States) STS-8, Challenger		5 September 1983 (United States) STS-8, Challenger	First African-American in space (Bluford). First night launch and landing. Deployed INSAT-1B satellite for India. Observation of behavior of rats in space.
—	(Soviet Union) Vladimir Titov (Soviet Union) Gennady Strekalov	26 September 1983 (Soviet Union) Soyuz T-10-1			Launch failed due to fire. Crew ejected.
96	(United States) John W. Young (6) (United States) Brewster H. Shaw (1) (United States) Owen K. Garriott (2) (United States) Robert A. Parker (1) (United States) Byron K. Lichtenberg (1) (Germany) Ulf Merbold (1)	28 November 1983 (United States) STS-9, Columbia		8 December 1983 (United States) STS-9, Columbia	First Spacelab (orbital laboratory) mission. First ESA astronaut, first West German astronaut and first non-American on US flight (Merbold).
97	(United States) Vance D. Brand (3) (United States) Robert L. Gibson (1) (United States) Bruce McCandless II (1) (United States) Ronald E. McNair (1) (United States) Robert L. Stewart (1)	3 February 1984 (United States) STS-41-B, Challenger		11 February 1984 (United States) STS-41-B, Challenger	First untethered spacewalk (McCandless and Stewart). WESTAR-VI and PALAPA-B2 satellites deployed but failed to attain correct orbits.
98	(Soviet Union) Leonid Kizim (2) (Soviet Union) Vladimir Solovyov (1) (Soviet Union) Oleg Atkov	4 February 1984 (Soviet Union) Soyuz T-10	Salyut 7	2 October 1984 (Soviet Union) Soyuz T-11	
99	(Soviet Union) Yury Malyshev (2) (Soviet Union) Gennadi Strekalov (3) (India) Rakesh Sharma	3 April 1984 (Soviet Union) Soyuz T-11	Salyut 7	11 April 1984 (Soviet Union) Soyuz T-10	First Indian in space (Sharma). Earth observation program. Life sciences and materials processing experiments.
100	(United States) Robert L. Crippen (3) (United States) Francis R. Scobee (1) (United States) George D. Nelson (1) (United States) James D. A. van Hoften (1) (United States) Terry J. Hart	6 April 1984 (United States) STS-41-C, Challenger		13 April 1984 (United States) STS-41-C, Challenger	LDEF deployed for later retrieval. Capture, repair and redeployment of malfunctioning Solar Maximum Mission satellite.
101	(Soviet Union) Vladimir Dzhanibekov (4) (Soviet Union) Igor Volk (Soviet Union) Svetlana Savitskaya (2)	17 July 1984 (Soviet Union) Soyuz T-12	Salyut 7	29 July 1984 (Soviet Union) Soyuz T-12	First EVA by a female astronaut (Savitskaya).
102	(United States) Henry W. Hartsfield (2) (United States) Michael L. Coats (1) (United States) Judith A. Resnik (1) (United States) Steven A. Hawley (1) (United States) Richard M. Mullane (1) (United States) Charles D. Walker (1)	30 August 1984 (United States) STS-41-D, Discovery		5 September 1984 (United States) STS-41-D, Discovery	Testing of experimental solar arrays. Three satellites deployed.
103	(United States) Robert L. Crippen (4) (United States) Jon A. McBride (1) (United States) Kathryn D. Sullivan (1) (United States) Sally K. Ride (2) (United States) David C. Leestma (1) (Canada) Marc Garneau (1) (United States) Paul D. Scully-Power	5 October 1984 (United States) STS-41-G, Challenger		13 October 1984 (United States) STS-41-G, Challenger	ERBS satellite deployed. Radar imaging. First EVA by an American woman (Sullivan). First Canadian in space (Garneau). First flight including two women.
104	(United States) Frederick H. Hauck (2) (United States) David M. Walker (1) (United States) Anna L. Fisher (United States) Dale A. Gardner (2) (United States) Joseph P. Allen (2)	8 November 1984 (United States) STS-51-A, Discovery		16 November 1984 (United States) STS-51-A, Discovery	Deployed two communications satellites. Retrieved two malfunctioning satellites.
105	(United States) Thomas K. Mattingly (3) (United States) Loren J. Shriver (1) (United States) Ellison S. Onizuka (1) (United States) James F. Buchli (1) (United States) Gary E. Payton	24 January 1985 (United States) STS-51-C, Discovery		27 January 1985 (United States) STS-51-C, Discovery	First mission for the U.S. Department of Defense. Classified payload, possibly intelligence-gathering satellite.
106	(United States) Karol J. Bobko (2) (United States) Donald E. Williams (1) (United States) M. Rhea Seddon (1) (United States) Jeffrey A. Hoffman (1) (United States) S. David Griggs (United States) Charles D. Walker (2) (United States) E. Jake Garn	12 April 1985 (United States) STS-51-D, Discovery		19 April 1985 (United States) STS-51-D, Discovery	Communications satellite deployed. Miscellaneous scientific experiments. First sitting member of U.S. Congress in space (Garn).
107	(United States) Robert F. Overmyer (2) (United States) Frederick D. Gregory (1) (United States) Don L. Lind (United States) Norman E. Thagard (2) (United States) William E. Thornton (2) (United States) Lodewijk van den Berg (United States) Taylor G. Wang	29 April 1985 (United States) STS-51-B, Challenger		6 May 1985 (United States) STS-51-B, Challenger	Second Spacelab mission; microgravity experiments. Observation of behaviour of monkeys and rodents in space.
108	(Soviet Union) Vladimir Dzhanibekov (5)	5 June 1985 (Soviet Union) Soyuz T-13	Salyut 7	26 September 1985 (Soviet Union) Soyuz T-13	Repair of crippled Salyut 7 station.
108	(Soviet Union) Viktor Savinykh (2)	5 June 1985 (Soviet Union) Soyuz T-13	Salyut 7	21 November 1985 (Soviet Union) Soyuz T-14	Repair of crippled Salyut 7 station.
109	(United States) Daniel C. Brandenstein (2) (United States) John O. Creighton (1) (United States) Shannon W. Lucid (1) (United States) Steven R. Nagel (1) (United States) John M. Fabian (2) (France) Patrick Baudry (Saudi Arabia) Sultan Salman Al Saud	17 June 1985 (United States) STS-51-G, Discovery		24 June 1985 (United States) STS-51-G, Discovery	Three communications satellites deployed. Miscellaneous scientific experiments. First Saudi and the first Arab in space (Al-Saud).
110	(United States) C. Gordon Fullerton (2) (United States) Roy D. Bridges (United States) F. Story Musgrave (2) (United States) Anthony W. England (United States) Karl G. Henize (United States) Loren W. Acton (United States) John-David F. Bartoe	29 July 1985 (United States) STS-51-F, Challenger		6 August 1985 (United States) STS-51-F, Challenger	Spacelab-2 mission. Miscellaneous science experiments. Three communications satellites deployed.
111	(United States) Joseph H. Engle (2) (United States) Richard O. Covey (1) (United States) James D.A. van Hoften (2) (United States) John M. Lounge (1) (United States) William F. Fisher	27 August 1985 (United States) STS-51-I, Discovery		3 September 1985 (United States) STS-51-I, Discovery	Three communications satellites deployed. Retrieval, repair and redeployment of LEASAT-3 satellite.
112	(Soviet Union) Vladimir Vasyutin (Soviet Union) Aleksandr Volkov (1)	17 September 1985 (Soviet Union) Soyuz T-14	Salyut 7	21 November 1985 (Soviet Union) Soyuz T-14	
112	(Soviet Union) Georgi Grechko (3)	17 September 1985 (Soviet Union) Soyuz T-14	Salyut 7	26 September 1985 (Soviet Union) Soyuz T-13	
113	(United States) Karol J. Bobko (3) (United States) Ronald J. Grabe (1) (United States) David C. Hilmers (1) (United States) Robert L. Stewart (2) (United States) William A. Pailes	3 October 1985 (United States) STS-51-J, Atlantis		7 October 1985 (United States) STS-51-J, Atlantis	Second U.S. Department of Defense mission. Classified payload, believed to be two communications satellites.
114	(United States) Henry W. Hartsfield (3) (United States) Steven R. Nagel (2) (United States) James F. Buchli (2) (United States) Guion Bluford (2) (United States) Bonnie J. Dunbar (1) (Germany) Reinhard Furrer (Germany) Ernst Messerschmid (Netherlands) Wubbo J. Ockels	30 October 1985 (United States) STS-61-A, Challenger		6 November 1985 (United States) STS-61-A, Challenger	German-sponsored Spacelab mission. Microgravity experiments. First Dutchman in space (Ockels).
115	(United States) Brewster H. Shaw (2) (United States) Bryan D. O'Connor (1) (United States) Mary L. Cleave (1) (United States) Sherwood C. Spring (United States) Jerry L. Ross (1) (Mexico) Rodolfo Neri Vela (United States) Charles D. Walker (3)	26 November 1985 (United States) STS-61-B, Atlantis		3 December 1985 (United States) STS-61-B, Atlantis	Three communications satellites deployed. Demonstration of in-orbit construction techniques. First Mexican in space (Neri Vela).
116	(United States) Robert L. Gibson (2) (United States) Charles F. Bolden (1) (United States) Franklin R. Chang-Diaz (1) (United States) Steven A. Hawley (2) (United States) George D. Nelson (2) (United States) Robert J. Cenker (United States) Clarence W. Nelson	12 January 1986 (United States) STS-61-C, Columbia		18 January 1986 (United States) STS-61-C, Columbia	Deployment of communications satellite. Miscellaneous science experiments.
—	(United States) Francis R. Scobee (2) (United States) Michael J. Smith (United States) Judith A. Resnik (2) (United States) Ellison S. Onizuka (2) (United States) Ronald E. McNair (2) (United States) Gregory B. Jarvis (United States) S. Christa McAuliffe	28 January 1986 (United States) STS-51-L, Challenger			Disintegrated 73 seconds after launch with loss of all crew.
117	(Soviet Union) Leonid Kizim (3) (Soviet Union) Vladimir Solovyov (2)	13 March 1986 (Soviet Union) Soyuz T-15	Mir; Salyut 7 Mir	16 July 1986 (Soviet Union) Soyuz T-15	First expedition to Mir. Last expedition to Salyut 7.
118	(Soviet Union) Alexander Laveykin	7 February 1987 (Soviet Union) Soyuz TM-2	Mir	30 July 1987 (Soviet Union) Soyuz TM-2	Mir crew rotation and maintenance.
118	(Soviet Union) Yuri Romanenko (3)	7 February 1987 (Soviet Union) Soyuz TM-2	Mir	29 December 1987 (Soviet Union) Soyuz TM-3	Mir crew rotation and maintenance.
119	(Soviet Union) Aleksandr Viktorenko (1) (Syria) Mohammed Faris	22 July 1987 (Soviet Union) Soyuz TM-3	Mir	30 July 1987 (Soviet Union) Soyuz TM-2	Mir crew rotation. First Syrian in space (Faris).
119	(Soviet Union) Aleksandr Aleksandrov (2)	22 July 1987 (Soviet Union) Soyuz TM-3	Mir	29 December 1987 (Soviet Union) Soyuz TM-3	Mir crew rotation. First Syrian in space (Faris).
120	(Soviet Union) Anatoli Levchenko	21 December 1987 (Soviet Union) Soyuz TM-4	Mir	29 December 1987 (Soviet Union) Soyuz TM-3	Mir crew rotation. Biological experiments and astronomical observations.
120	(Soviet Union) Vladimir Titov (2) (Soviet Union) Musa Manarov (1)	21 December 1987 (Soviet Union) Soyuz TM-4	Mir	21 December 1988 (Soviet Union) Soyuz TM-6	Mir crew rotation. Biological experiments and astronomical observations.
121	(Soviet Union) Anatoly Solovyev (1) (Soviet Union) Victor Savinykh (3) (Bulgaria) Aleksandr Aleksandrov	7 June 1988 (Soviet Union) Soyuz TM-5	Mir	17 June 1988 (Soviet Union) Soyuz TM-4	
122	(Soviet Union) Vladimir Lyakhov (3) (Afghanistan) Abdul Ahad Mohmand	29 August 1988 (Soviet Union) Soyuz TM-6	Mir	7 September 1988 (Soviet Union) Soyuz TM-5	Mir crew rotation. First Afghan in space (Mohmand).
122	(Soviet Union) Valeri Polyakov (1)	29 August 1988 (Soviet Union) Soyuz TM-6	Mir	27 April 1989 (Soviet Union) Soyuz TM-7	Mir crew rotation. First Afghan in space (Mohmand).
123	(United States) Frederick H. Hauck (3) (United States) Richard O. Covey (2) (United States) John M. Lounge (2) (United States) George D. Nelson (3) (United States) David C. Hilmers (2)	28 September 1988 (United States) STS-26, Discovery		3 October 1988 (United States) STS-26, Discovery	First "Return to Flight" Space Shuttle mission after Challenger disaster. Deployment of Tracking and Data Relay Satellite-3 (TDRS-3).
124	(Soviet Union) Aleksandr Volkov (2) (Soviet Union) Sergei Krikalev (1)	26 November 1988 (Soviet Union) Soyuz TM-7	Mir	27 April 1989 (Soviet Union) Soyuz TM-7	Mir crew rotation. Technology experiments. First European EVA (Chrétien).
124	(France) Jean-Loup Chrétien (2)	26 November 1988 (Soviet Union) Soyuz TM-7	Mir	21 December 1988 (Soviet Union) Soyuz TM-6	Mir crew rotation. Technology experiments. First European EVA (Chrétien).
125	(United States) Robert L. Gibson (3) (United States) Guy S. Gardner (1) (United States) Richard M. Mullane (2) (United States) Jerry L. Ross (2) (United States) William M. Shepherd (1)	2 December 1988 (United States) STS-27, Atlantis		6 December 1988 (United States) STS-27, Atlantis	U.S. Department of Defense mission. Classified payload, reportedly Lacrosse 1 radar reconnaissance satellite.
126	(United States) Michael L. Coats (2) (United States) John E. Blaha (1) (United States) James P. Bagian (1) (United States) James F. Buchli (3) (United States) Robert C. Springer (1)	13 March 1989 (United States) STS-29, Discovery		18 March 1989 (United States) STS-29, Discovery	Deployment of Tracking and Data Relay Satellite-4 (TDRS-4). Miscellaneous science experiments.
127	(United States) David M. Walker (2) (United States) Ronald J. Grabe (2) (United States) Norman E. Thagard (3) (United States) Mary L. Cleave (2) (United States) Mark C. Lee (1)	4 May 1989 (United States) STS-30, Atlantis		8 May 1989 (United States) STS-30, Atlantis	Magellan probe deployed.
128	(United States) Brewster H. Shaw (3) (United States) Richard N. Richards (1) (United States) James C. Adamson (1) (United States) David C. Leestma (2) (United States) Mark N. Brown (1)	8 August 1989 (United States) STS-28, Columbia		13 August 1989 (United States) STS-28, Columbia	U.S. Department of Defense mission. Classified payload, reportedly military communications and reconnaissance satellites.
129	(Soviet Union) Alexander Viktorenko (2) (Soviet Union) Aleksandr Serebrov (3)	5 September 1989 (Soviet Union) Soyuz TM-8	Mir	19 February 1990 (Soviet Union) Soyuz TM-8	Mir equipment installation.
130	(United States) Donald E. Williams (2) (United States) Michael J. McCulley (United States) Franklin R. Chang-Diaz (2) (United States) Shannon W. Lucid (2) (United States) Ellen S. Baker (1)	18 October 1989 (United States) STS-34, Atlantis		23 October 1989 (United States) STS-34, Atlantis	Galileo probe deployed.
131	(United States) Frederick D. Gregory (2) (United States) John E. Blaha (2) (United States) F. Story Musgrave (3) (United States) Manley L. Carter (United States) Kathryn C. Thornton (1)	22 November 1989 (United States) STS-33, Discovery		27 November 1989 (United States) STS-33, Discovery	U.S. Department of Defense mission. Classified payload, reportedly reconnaissance satellite. First African-American Shuttle Commander.
132	(United States) Daniel C. Brandenstein (3) (United States) James D. Wetherbee (1) (United States) Bonnie J. Dunbar (2) (United States) G. David Low (1) (United States) Marsha S. Ivins (1)	9 January 1990 (United States) STS-32, Columbia		20 January 1990 (United States) STS-32, Columbia	Deployment of defense communications satellite. Long Duration Exposure Facility (LDEF) retrieval.
133	(Soviet Union) Anatoly Solovyev (2) (Soviet Union) Alexander Balandin	11 February 1990 (Soviet Union) Soyuz TM-9	Mir	17 July 1990 (Soviet Union) Soyuz TM-9	
134	(United States) John O. Creighton (2) (United States) John H. Casper (1) (United States) Richard M. Mullane (3) (United States) David C. Hilmers (3) (United States) Pierre J. Thuot (1)	28 February 1990 (United States) STS-36, Atlantis		4 March 1990 (United States) STS-36, Atlantis	U.S. Department of Defense mission. Classified payload, reportedly reconnaissance satellite.
135	(United States) Loren J. Shriver (2) (United States) Charles F. Bolden (2) (United States) Steven A. Hawley (3) (United States) Bruce McCandless II (2) (United States) Kathryn D. Sullivan (2)	24 April 1990 (United States) STS-31, Discovery		29 April 1990 (United States) STS-31, Discovery	Hubble Space Telescope deployed.
136	(Soviet Union) Gennadi Strekalov (4) (Soviet Union) Gennadi Manakov (1)	3 August 1990 (Soviet Union) Soyuz TM-10	Mir	10 December 1990 (Soviet Union) Soyuz TM-10	
137	(United States) Richard N. Richards (2) (United States) Robert D. Cabana (1) (United States) William M. Shepherd (2) (United States) Bruce E. Melnick (1) (United States) Thomas D. Akers (1)	6 October 1990 (United States) STS-41, Discovery		10 October 1990 (United States) STS-41, Discovery	Ulysses probe deployed. Miscellaneous science experiments.
138	(United States) Richard O. Covey (3) (United States) Frank L. Culbertson (1) (United States) Robert C. Springer (2) (United States) Carl J. Meade (1) (United States) Charles D. Gemar (1)	15 November 1990 (United States) STS-38, Atlantis		20 November 1990 (United States) STS-38, Atlantis	U.S. Department of Defense mission. Classified payload, reportedly reconnaissance satellite.
139	(United States) Vance D. Brand (4) (United States) Guy S. Gardner (2) (United States) Jeffrey A. Hoffman (2) (United States) John M. Lounge (3) (United States) Robert A. Parker (2) (United States) Samuel T. Durrance (1) (United States) Ronald A. Parise (1)	2 December 1990 (United States) STS-35, Columbia		10 December 1990 (United States) STS-35, Columbia	Ultraviolet and X-ray astronomy (ASTRO-1 observatory).
140	(Soviet Union) Viktor Afanasyev (1) (Soviet Union) Musa Manarov (2)	2 December 1990 (Soviet Union) Soyuz TM-11	Mir	26 May 1991 (Soviet Union) Soyuz TM-11	Mir crew rotation. First Japanese in space (Akiyama).
140	(Japan) Toyohiro Akiyama	2 December 1990 (Soviet Union) Soyuz TM-11	Mir	10 December 1990 (Soviet Union) Soyuz TM-10	Mir crew rotation. First Japanese in space (Akiyama).

== See also ==
- List of human spaceflight programs
- List of human spaceflights
- List of human spaceflights, 1961–1970
- List of human spaceflights, 1971–1980
- List of human spaceflights, 1991–2000
- List of human spaceflights, 2001–2010
- List of human spaceflights, 2011–2020
- List of human spaceflights, 2021–present
