= List of Salyut visitors =

This is a list of visitors to the Salyut space stations in alphabetical order. The names of stations to the right of crew members indicate which stations they visited. If they were a member of an Expedition crew aboard that station, the station name is in bold, and if they commanded the station, the station name is in italics. All cosmonauts were citizens of the Soviet Union unless otherwise noted.

== Statistics ==
Between 1971 and 1986, 48 individuals of eleven different nationalities visited the Salyut space stations. Vladimir Dzhanibekov made the most visits to Salyut stations, with two trips to Salyut 6 and three to Salyut 7. Georgi Grechko was the only cosmonaut to visit three different Salyut stations; Salyut 4, Salyut 6 and Salyut 7. Svetlana Savitskaya, who made two flights to Salyut 7, was the only woman to fly as part of the programme.

=== By nationality ===
Nationality	Salyut														Remarks
Nationality	1		3		4		5		6		7		Total		Remarks
Nationality	Trips	Fliers	Trips	Fliers	Trips	Fliers	Trips	Fliers	Trips	Fliers	Trips	Fliers	Trips	Fliers	Remarks
Soviet Union	3	3	2	2	4	4	4	4	26	20	24	19	61	38	
Cuba	-	-	-	-	-	-	-	-	1	1	-	-	1	1	
Czechoslovakia	-	-	-	-	-	-	-	-	1	1	-	-	1	1	
East Germany	-	-	-	-	-	-	-	-	1	1	-	-	1	1	
France	-	-	-	-	-	-	-	-	-	-	1	1	1	1	
Hungary	-	-	-	-	-	-	-	-	1	1	-	-	1	1	
India	-	-	-	-	-	-	-	-	-	-	1	1	1	1	
Mongolia	-	-	-	-	-	-	-	-	1	1	-	-	1	1	
Poland	-	-	-	-	-	-	-	-	1	1	-	-	1	1	
Romania	-	-	-	-	-	-	-	-	1	1	-	-	1	1	
Vietnam	-	-	-	-	-	-	-	-	1	1	-	-	1	1	
**Total**	3	3	2	2	4	4	4	4	34	28	26	21	71	48	

=== By organisation ===
Organisation	Salyut														Remarks
Organisation	1		3		4		5		6		7		Total		Remarks
Organisation	Trips	Fliers	Trips	Fliers	Trips	Fliers	Trips	Fliers	Trips	Fliers	Trips	Fliers	Trips	Fliers	Remarks
Soviet space programme	3	3	2	2	4	4	4	4	26	20	24	19	61	38	
Interkosmos	-	-	-	-	-	-	-	-	8	8	2	2	10	10	
**Total**	3	3	2	2	4	4	4	4	34	28	26	21	71	48	

== A ==
- Vladimir Aksyonov (Salyut 6)
- Aleksandr Aleksandrov (**Salyut 7**)
- Yuri Artyukhin (**Salyut 3**)
- Oleg Atkov (**Salyut 7**)

== B ==
- Anatoli Berezovoy (**Salyut 7**)
- Valery Bykovsky (Salyut 6)

== C ==
- Jean-Loup Chrétien (France) (Salyut 7)

== D ==
- Georgi Dobrovolski (**Salyut 1**)
- Vladimir Dzhanibekov (Salyut 6, Salyut 6, Salyut 7, Salyut 7, **Salyut 7**)

== F ==
- Bertalan Farkas (Hungary) (Salyut 6)

== G ==
- Yuri Glazkov (**Salyut 5**)
- Viktor Gorbatko (**Salyut 5**, Salyut 6)
- Georgi Grechko (**Salyut 4**, **Salyut 6**, Salyut 7)
- Aleksei Gubarev (**Salyut 4**, Salyut 6)
- Jügderdemidiin Gürragchaa (Mongolia) (Salyut 6)

== H ==
- Mirosław Hermaszewski (Poland) (Salyut 6)

== I ==
- Aleksandr Ivanchenkov (**Salyut 6**, Salyut 7)

== J ==
- Sigmund Jähn (East Germany) (Salyut 6)

== K ==
- Leonid Kizim (**Salyut 6**, **Salyut 7**, **Salyut 7**)
- Pyotr Klimuk (**Salyut 4**, Salyut 6)
- Vladimir Kovalyonok (**Salyut 6**, **Salyut 6**)
- Valery Kubasov (Salyut 6)

== L ==
- Valentin Lebedev (**Salyut 7**)
- Vladimir Lyakhov (**Salyut 6**, **Salyut 7**)

== M ==
- Oleg Makarov (Salyut 6, **Salyut 6**)
- Yury Malyshev (Salyut 6, Salyut 7)
- Arnaldo Tamayo Méndez (Cuba) (Salyut 6)

== P ==
- Viktor Patsayev (**Salyut 1**)
- Phạm Tuân (Vietnam) (Salyut 6)
- Leonid Popov (**Salyut 6**, Salyut 6, Salyut 7)
- Pavel Popovich (**Salyut 3**)
- Dumitru Prunariu (Romania) (Salyut 6)

== R ==
- Vladimír Remek (Czechoslovakia) (Salyut 6)
- Yuri Romanenko (**Salyut 6**, Salyut 6)
- Valery Ryumin (**Salyut 6**, **Salyut 6**)

== S ==
- Viktor Savinykh (**Salyut 6**, **Salyut 7**)
- Svetlana Savitskaya (Salyut 7, Salyut 7)
- Aleksandr Serebrov (Salyut 7)
- Vitali Sevastyanov (**Salyut 4**)
- Rakesh Sharma (India) (Salyut 7)
- Vladimir Solovyov (**Salyut 7**, **Salyut 7**)
- Gennady Strekalov (**Salyut 6**, Salyut 7)

== V ==
- Vladimir Vasyutin (**Salyut 7**)
- Igor Volk (Salyut 7)
- Aleksandr Volkov (**Salyut 7**)
- Vladislav Volkov (**Salyut 1**)
- Boris Volynov (**Salyut 5**)

== Z ==
- Vitali Zholobov (**Salyut 5**)

== See also ==
- List of astronauts by name
- Salyut programme
- List of human spaceflights to Salyut space stations
- List of Salyut expeditions
- List of Salyut spacewalks
- List of uncrewed spaceflights to Salyut space stations
- List of Mir visitors
- List of International Space Station visitors
