= Soyuz-T =

Third-generation of the Soyuz spacecraft

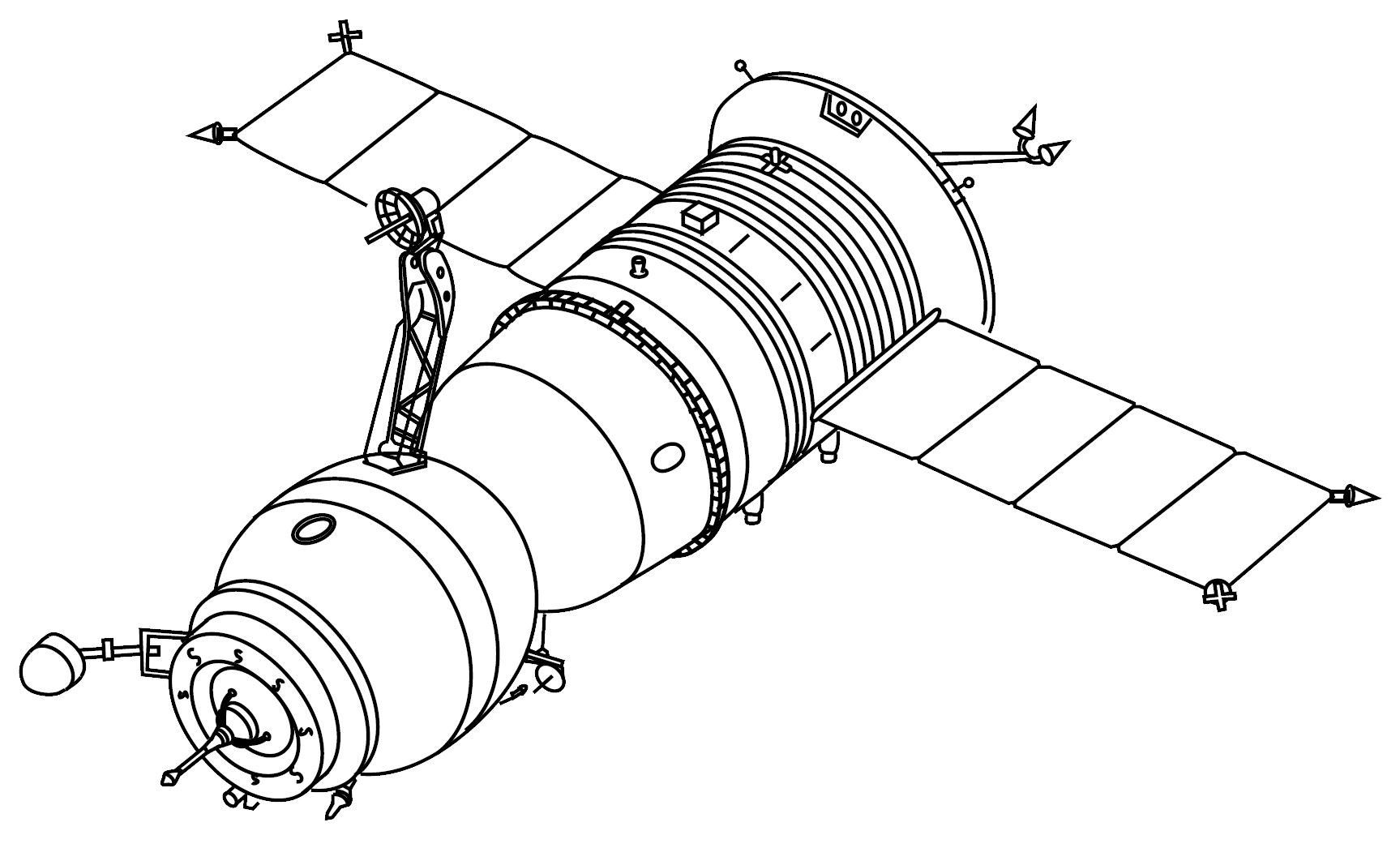
- Soyuz-T spacecraft
- Manufacturer: Korolev
- Country of origin: USSR
- Operator: Soviet space program
- Applications: Carry three cosmonauts to Salyut and Mir space stations and back

Specifications
- Regime: Low Earth orbit

Production
- Status: Out of service
- Launched: 18
- Maiden launch: 4 April 1978 (Kosmos 1001)
- Last launch: 16 March 1986 (Soyuz T-15)

Related spacecraft
- Derived from: Soyuz 7K-T; Military Soyuz; Soyuz 7K-TM
- Derivatives: Soyuz-TM

The Soyuz-T (Russian: Союз-T) was the third generation of the Soyuz spacecraft and operated from 1979 to 1986. The T designation stood for "transport" (Russian: транспортныйL, romanized: transportny), reflecting its primary role ferrying crews to and from space stations. The design was based on the second-generation Soyuz 7K-T and incorporated experience gained from the Military Soyuz program and the Soyuz 7K-TM used for the Apollo–Soyuz Test Project.

Soyuz-T introduced several major improvements over earlier models. It was the first Soyuz to use solid-state electronics and featured an upgraded onboard computer intended to reduce the docking difficulties encountered on previous missions. Solar panels returned to the design, enabling autonomous flight for up to 11 days, and the spacecraft adopted a new propulsion system, the KTDU-426. Unlike preceding versions, Soyuz-T could carry three cosmonauts wearing pressure suits.

== Missions ==
Between 1979 and 1986, a total of 18 Soyuz T spacecraft were launched into LEO, 13 of which carried cosmonauts to and from the space stations Salyut 6, Salyut 7, and Mir.

Mission	Crew	Launch	Landing	Duration	Notes
Kosmos 1001	None	4 Apr 1978	15 Apr 1978	11 days	Uncrewed test flight. Partial failure of systems led to early landing.
Kosmos 1074	None	31 Jan 1979	1 Apr 1979	60 days	Uncrewed test flight. Last Soyuz spacecraft with a Kosmos designation
Soyuz T-1	None	16 Dec 1979	25 Mar 1980	100 days	Uncrewed test flight to Salyut 6
Soyuz T-2	Salyut 6 EP-6: Yury Malyshev; Vladimir Aksyonov	5 Jun 1980	9 Jun 1980	4 days	Crewed test flight to Salyut 6
Soyuz T-3	Salyut 6 EO-5: Leonid Kizim; Oleg Makarov; Gennady Strekalov	27 Nov 1980	10 Dec 1980	13 days	First Soyuz mission with a three cosmonaut crew since the fatal flight of Soyuz 11
Soyuz T-4	Salyut 6 EO-6: Vladimir Kovalyonok; Viktor Savinykh	12 Mar 1981	26 May 1981	75 days	
Soyuz T-5	Salyut 7 EO-1: Anatoli Berezovoy; Valentin Lebedev	13 May 1982	27 Aug 1982	106 days	Both Berezovoy and Lebedev returned to Earth aboard Soyuz T-7 after 211 days in space
Soyuz T-6	Salyut 7 EP-1: Vladimir Dzhanibekov; Aleksandr Ivanchenkov; Jean-Loup Chrétien	24 Jun 1982	2 Jul 1982	8 days	Chrétien becomes the first French citizen in space
Soyuz T-7	Salyut 7 EP-2: Leonid Popov; Aleksandr Serebrov; Svetlana Savitskaya	19 Aug 1982	10 Dec 1982	113 days	Savitskaya becomes the second woman in space after Valentina Tereshkova in 1963. All cosmonauts returned to Earth aboard Soyuz T-5 after 8 days in space
Soyuz T-8	Vladimir Titov; Gennady Strekalov; Aleksandr Serebrov	20 Apr 1983	22 Apr 1983	2 days	Failed to reach Salyut 7 after its Igla docking system was damaged during launch
Soyuz T-9	Salyut 7 EO-2: Vladimir Lyakhov; Aleksandr Aleksandrov	27 Jun 1983	23 Nov 1983	149 days	
Soyuz T-10-1	Vladimir Titov; Gennadi Strekalov	26 Sept 1983		5 minutes and 13 seconds	Failed to reach Salyut 7 after its carrier rocket caught fire and exploded, thus activating its launch escape system
Soyuz T-10	Salyut 7 EO-3: Leonid Kizim; Vladimir Solovyov; Oleg Atkov	8 Feb 1984	11 Apr 1984	63 days	All cosmonauts returned to Earth aboard Soyuz T-11 after 237 days in space
Soyuz T-11	Salyut 7 EP-3: Yuri Malyshev; Gennady Strekalov; Rakesh Sharma	3 Apr 1984	2 Oct 1984	182 days	Sharma becomes first Indian citizen in space. All cosmonauts returned to Earth aboard Soyuz T-10 after 8 days in space
Soyuz T-12	Salyut 7 EP-4: Vladimir Dzhanibekov; Svetlana Savitskaya; Igor Volk	17 Jul 1984	29 Jul 1984	12 days	
Soyuz T-13	Salyut 7 EO-4a: Vladimir Dzhanibekov; Viktor Savinykh	6 Jun 1985	26 Sept 1985	112 days	Repaired the crippled station during their stay. Savinykh returned to Earth aboard Soyuz T-14 after 168 days in space
Soyuz T-14	Salyut 7 EO-4b: Vladimir Vasyutin; Alexander Volkov; Salyut 7 EP-5: Georgi Grechko	17 Sept 1985	21 Nov 1985	65 days	Grechko returned to Earth aboard Soyuz T-13 after 9 days in space. Mission ended prematurely after Vasyutin fell ill aboard the station
Soyuz T-15	Salyut 7 EO-5 / Mir EO-1: Leonid Kizim; Vladimir Solovyov	13 Mar 1986	16 Jul 1986	125 days	Visited both Salyut 7 and Mir, the only crewed spaceflight to visit two space stations
