= Soyuz T-10 =

1984 Soviet crewed spaceflight to Salyut 7

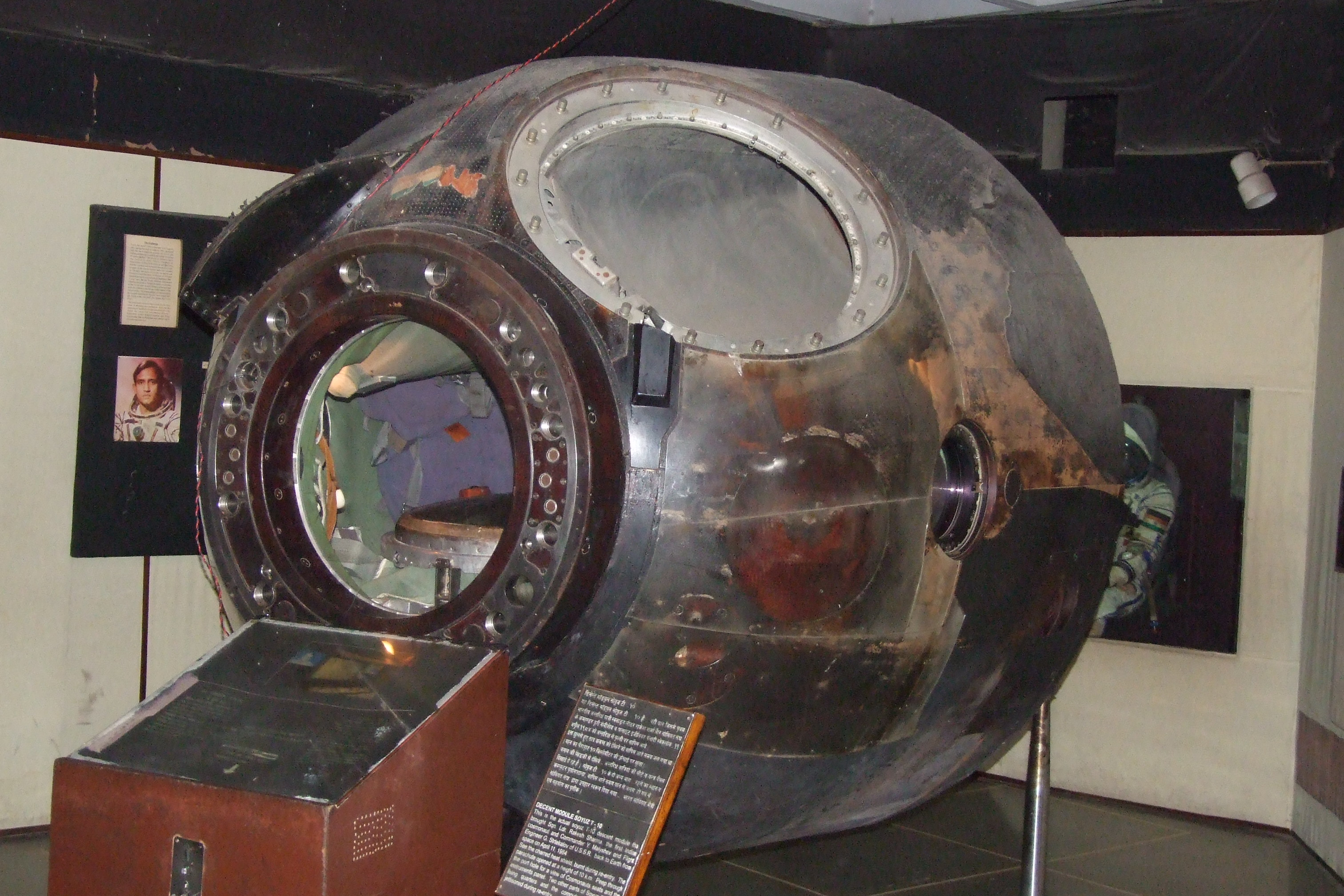
- The Soyuz T-10 return capsule on display at the Nehru Planetarium in New Delhi, India
- Mission type: Dock with Salyut 7
- Operator: Experimental Design Bureau (OKB-1)
- COSPAR ID: 1984-014A
- SATCAT no.: 14701
- Mission duration: 62 days 22 hours 41 minutes 22 seconds

Spacecraft properties
- Spacecraft: Soyuz 7K-ST No.15L
- Spacecraft type: Soyuz-T
- Manufacturer: Experimental Design Bureau (OKB-1)
- Launch mass: 6850 kg
- Landing mass: 2800 kg

Crew
- Crew size: 3
- Launching: Leonid Kizim; Vladimir Solovyov; Oleg Atkov
- Landing: Yuri Malyshev; Gennadi Strekalov; Rakesh Sharma
- Callsign: Mayak (Beacon)

Start of mission
- Launch date: 8 February 1984, 12:07:26 UTC
- Rocket: Soyuz-U s/n Yu15000-357
- Launch site: Baikonur, Site 31/6
- Contractor: Experimental Design Bureau (OKB-1)

End of mission
- Landing date: 11 April 1984, 10:48:48 UTC
- Landing site: 160 km at the east of Dzhezkazgan, Kazakhstan

Orbital parameters
- Reference system: Geocentric orbit
- Regime: Low Earth orbit
- Perigee altitude: 199.0 km
- Apogee altitude: 219.0 km
- Inclination: 51.6°
- Period: 88.7 minutes

Docking with Salyut 7
- Docking date: 13 April 1984

Soyuz T-10 was the fifth expedition to the Salyut 7 space station. It entered a darkened and empty station because of the loss of Soyuz T-10a. It was visited by the sixth and seventh expeditions. During the course of the cosmonauts stay, three extravehicular activities took place to repair a fuel line.

During their multiple spacewalks to perform maintenance on the station, the crew set a record for spacewalk hours.

== Crew ==
Position	Launching Cosmonaut	Landing Cosmonaut
Commander	Leonid Kizim; Second spaceflight	Yuri Malyshev; Second and last spaceflight
Flight engineer	Vladimir Solovyov; First spaceflight	Gennadi Strekalov; Third spaceflight
Research cosmonaut	Oleg Atkov; Only spaceflight	Rakesh Sharma; Only spaceflight India

=== Backup crew ===
Position	Cosmonaut
Commander	Vladimir Vasyutin
Flight engineer	Viktor Savinykh
Research cosmonaut	Valeri Polyakov

== Mission parameters ==
- Mass: 6850 kg
- Perigee: 199.0 km
- Apogee: 219.0 km
- Inclination: 51.6°
- Period: 88.7 minutes

== Mission highlights ==
Fifth expedition to Salyut 7. Visited by 6th and 7th expeditions. The three-person Mayak crew entered the darkened Salyut 7 station carrying flashlights. The cosmonauts commented on the burnt-metal odor of the drogue docking unit. By 17 February 1984, Salyut 7 was fully reactivated, and the cosmonauts had settled into a routine. Physician Oleg Atkov did household chores and monitored his own health and that of his colleagues, who conducted experiments. During the previous year a fuel line on the station had ruptured. Kizim and Solovyov carried out three EVAs to try to fix the problem during the mission.

== Spacecraft location ==
The Soyuz T-10 descent module is on display at the Nehru Planetarium in New Delhi, India, along with the spacesuit of Rakesh Sharma.
