= Soyuz T-12 =

1984 Soviet crewed spaceflight to Salyut 7

- COSPAR ID: 1984-073A
- SATCAT no.: 15119
- Mission duration: 11 days, 19 hours, 14 minutes, 36 seconds
- Orbits completed: 186

Spacecraft properties
- Spacecraft type: Soyuz-T
- Manufacturer: NPO Energia
- Launch mass: 7,020 kilograms (15,480 lb)

Crew
- Crew size: 3
- Members: Vladimir Dzhanibekov; Svetlana Savitskaya; Igor Volk
- Callsign: Pamir (Pamir Mountains)

Start of mission
- Launch date: July 17, 1984, 17:40:54 UTC
- Rocket: Soyuz-U2
- Launch site: Baikonur 31/6

End of mission
- Landing date: July 29, 1984, 12:55:30 UTC
- Landing site: 140 kilometres (87 mi) SE of Dzhezkazgan

Orbital parameters
- Reference system: Geocentric
- Regime: Low Earth
- Perigee altitude: 192 kilometres (119 mi)
- Apogee altitude: 218 kilometres (135 mi)
- Inclination: 51.6 degrees
- Period: 88.6 minutes

Docking with Salyut 7
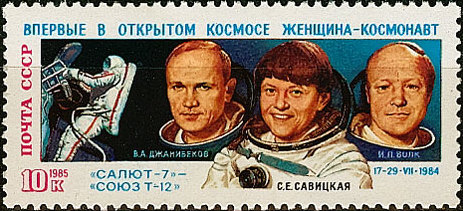
- Soyuz T-12 with spacewalk Soyuz programme (Crewed missions)

Soyuz T-12 (also known as Salyut 7 EP-4) was the seventh crewed spaceflight to the Soviet space station Salyut 7. The name "Soyuz T-12" is also the name of the spacecraft used to launch and land the mission's three-person crew. The mission occurred in July 1984, during the long-duration expedition Salyut 7 EO-3. During the mission, crew member Svetlana Savitskaya became the first woman to ever perform a spacewalk, and the potential Buran space shuttle pilot, Igor Volk, was given spaceflight experience. Unlike many Soyuz visiting missions, the Soyuz lifeboats were not swapped, and the crew returned to Earth in the same spacecraft in which they launched.

== Background ==
Igor Volk was a test pilot, and was planned to be the commander of the first Buran spaceflight. The rule introduced following the Soyuz 25 failure insisted that all Soviet spaceflight must have at least one crew member who has been to space before. As a result, it was decided that Volk should have spaceflight experience, and he was originally scheduled to visit Salyut 7 in 1983. But following the failure of Soyuz T-8 to dock to Salyut 7, in April 1983, the Soyuz launch schedule was disrupted, and Volk's original crew members, Kizim and Solovyov, were rescheduled elsewhere. They later became long-duration crew members of Salyut 7 EO-3, and Volk was scheduled to fly in the passenger seat of the visiting mission Soyuz T-12 to the EO-3 crew, but the other members of the T-12 mission were not yet decided.

In November 1983, NASA announced that during STS-41-G, Kathryn D. Sullivan would become the first woman to perform a spacewalk. The NPO Energia chief decided that the Soviets would get there first, and assembled the Soyuz T-12 crew within a month of NASA's announcement, which included Volk as previously planned.

The back-up crew lists became available to Western space analysts in 1988, and they noted that the back-up crew contained a woman, but did not contain another LII test pilot. Judging from this, it appeared that, as reasons to have the Soyuz T-12 mission, achieving the first female spacewalk was more important than gaining experience for a potential Buran crew member.

At the time of the mission the Buran program was still a state secret. The appearance of Volk as a crew member caused some, including the British Interplanetary Society magazine Spaceflight, to ask why a test pilot was occupying a Soyuz seat usually reserved for researchers or foreign cosmonauts.

== Crew ==
Position	Crew
Commander	Vladimir Dzhanibekov; Fourth spaceflight
Flight engineer	Svetlana Savitskaya; Second and last spaceflight
Research cosmonaut	Igor Volk; Only spaceflight

=== Backup crew ===
Position	Crew
Commander	Vladimir Vasyutin
Flight engineer	Yekaterina Ivanova
Research cosmonaut	Viktor Savinykh

== Mission parameters ==
- Mass: 7020 kg
- Perigee: 192 km
- Apogee: 218 km
- Inclination: 51.6°
- Period: 88.6 minutes

== Mission highlights ==
Soyuz T-12 was the 7th expedition to Salyut 7.

Volk was a glimpse of things which might have been: he was a Buran programme program pilot being flown in space to prove he would be able to pilot Buran back to Earth after an extended stay in space.

The crew of Soyuz T-12 (callsign Pamir), the second Visiting Expedition to visit the Mayaks, included veteran cosmonaut Vladimir Dzhanibekov, Buran shuttle program cosmonaut Igor Volk, and Svetlana Savitskaya. On July 25 Dzhanibekov and Savitskaya performed a 3 hr, 30 min EVA (Savitskaya became the first woman ever to perform an EVA), during which they tested the URI multipurpose tool. They cut, welded, soldered, and coated metal samples. During the Pamirs' stay, the six cosmonauts aboard Salyut 7 also conducted Rezonans tests and collected station air samples.
