= Mir EO-7 =

Seventh expedition to Mir space station

- Mission type: Mir expedition
- Mission duration: 130 d, 20 h, 35 m (launch to landing)
- Orbits completed: 2,070

Expedition
- Space station: Mir
- Began: 1 August 1990
- Ended: 10 December 1990
- Arrived aboard: Soyuz TM-10
- Departed aboard: Soyuz TM-10

Crew
- Crew size: Two
- Members: Gennadi Manakov; Gennadi Strekalov

Mir EO-7 was the seventh long duration expedition to the space station Mir. The two crew members were Gennadi Manakov (Commander) and Gennadi Strekalov (Flight Engineer).

== Crew ==
Mir EO-7	Name	Spaceflight	Launch	Landing	Duration
Commander	(Soviet Union) Gennadi Manakov	First	1 August 1990; Soyuz TM-10	10 December 1990; Soyuz TM-10	130 days
Flight Engineer	(Soviet Union) Gennadi Strekalov	Fourth	1 August 1990; Soyuz TM-10	10 December 1990; Soyuz TM-10	130 days

The backup crew for this expedition were Viktor Afanasyev (Commander) and Musa Manarov (Flight Engineer).

== Overview ==
=== Crew Arrival ===
The two crew members arrived at Mir via Soyuz TM-10, which launched on 3 August 1990. The Soyuz spacecraft docked on to the Kvant2 Complex.

=== Mission Highlights ===
While on board, the crew conducted an extensive programme of geophysical and astrophysical research, experiments on biology and biotechnology and work on space materials science. They also performed extensive maintenance and repair work on the damaged hatch of the Kvant-2-module. This repair was only partially successful.

=== Expedition Conclusion ===
The crew left on Soyuz TM-10 on 7 December 1990. The expedition in total lasted 130 days, 20 hours and 35 minutes. The crew completed 2070 orbits of the Earth.

== See also ==
- 1990 in spaceflight
