= Kosmos 1001 =

Unmanned test flight of the Soyuz T spacecraft

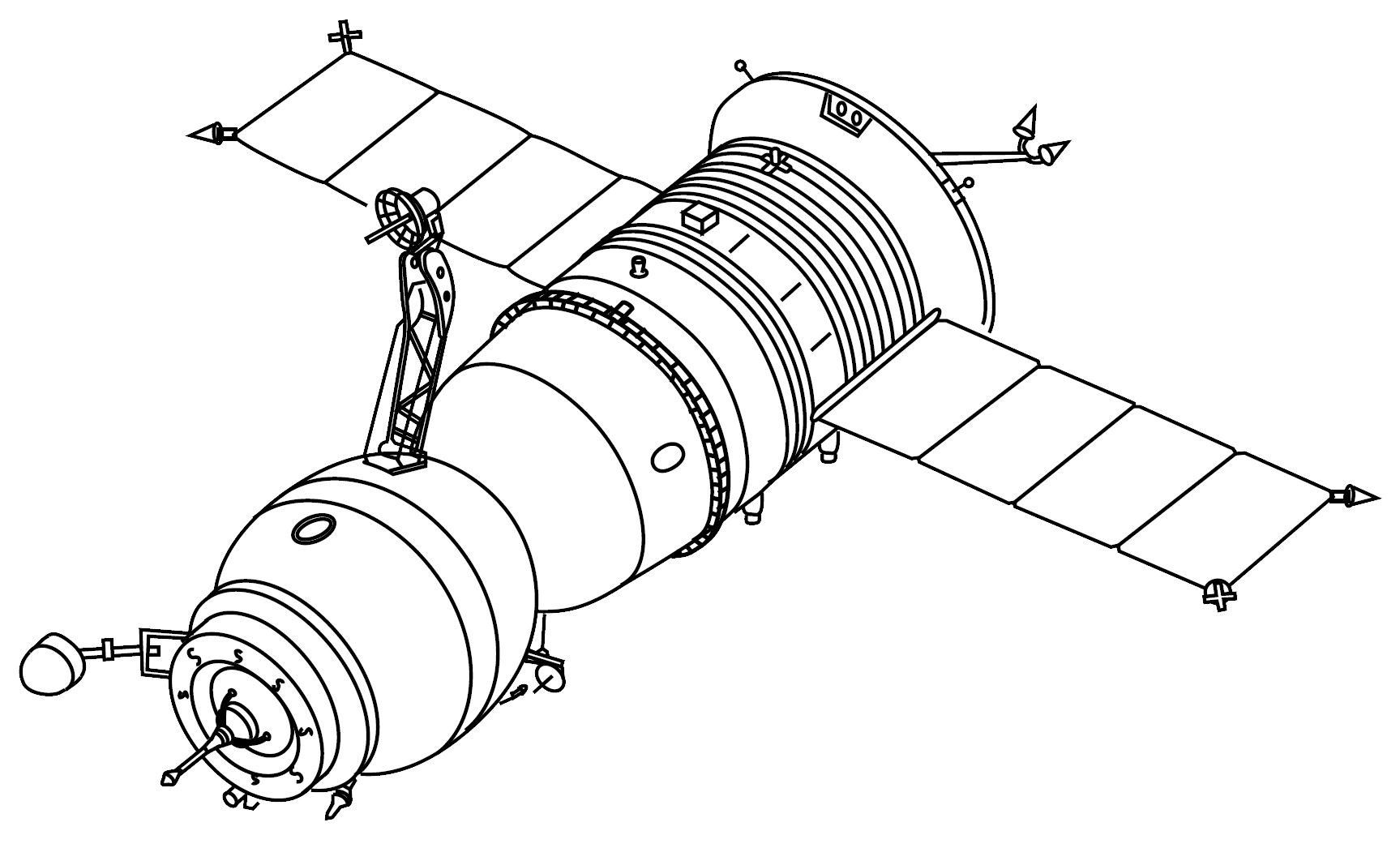
- Soyuz T
- Mission type: Orbital test flight
- Operator: Soviet space program
- COSPAR ID: 1978-036A
- SATCAT no.: 10783
- Mission duration: 10 days, 21 hours and 2 minutes

Spacecraft properties
- Spacecraft: Soyuz-T s/n 4L
- Spacecraft type: Soyuz 7K-ST (11F732)
- Manufacturer: NPO Energia
- Launch mass: 6,680 kg (14,730 lb)

Start of mission
- Launch date: 4 April 1978, 15:00 GMT
- Rocket: Soyuz-U
- Launch site: Baikonur 1/5

End of mission
- Disposal: Deorbited
- Landing date: 15 April 1978, 12:02 GMT

Orbital parameters
- Reference system: Geocentric
- Perigee altitude: 199 km (124 mi)
- Apogee altitude: 228 km (142 mi)
- Inclination: 51.6°
- Period: 88.7 min

Kosmos 1001 (Russian: Космос 1001 meaning Cosmos 1001) was a redesigned Soviet Soyuz T spacecraft that was flown on an unmanned test in 1978. The spacecraft was the upgraded Soyuz for Salyut 6 and Salyut 7. This Kosmos flight, launched from Baikonur, was the first orbital flight of the Soyuz T design. Several maneuvers were tested, however it failed to achieve all of its objectives and resulted in an early deorbit and landing

== Mission parameters ==
- Spacecraft: Soyuz 7K-ST
- Mass: 6680 kg.
- Crew: None.
- Launched: April 4, 1978.
- Landed: April 15, 1978.
