= Ravish Malhotra =

Indian Air Force pilot (born 1943)

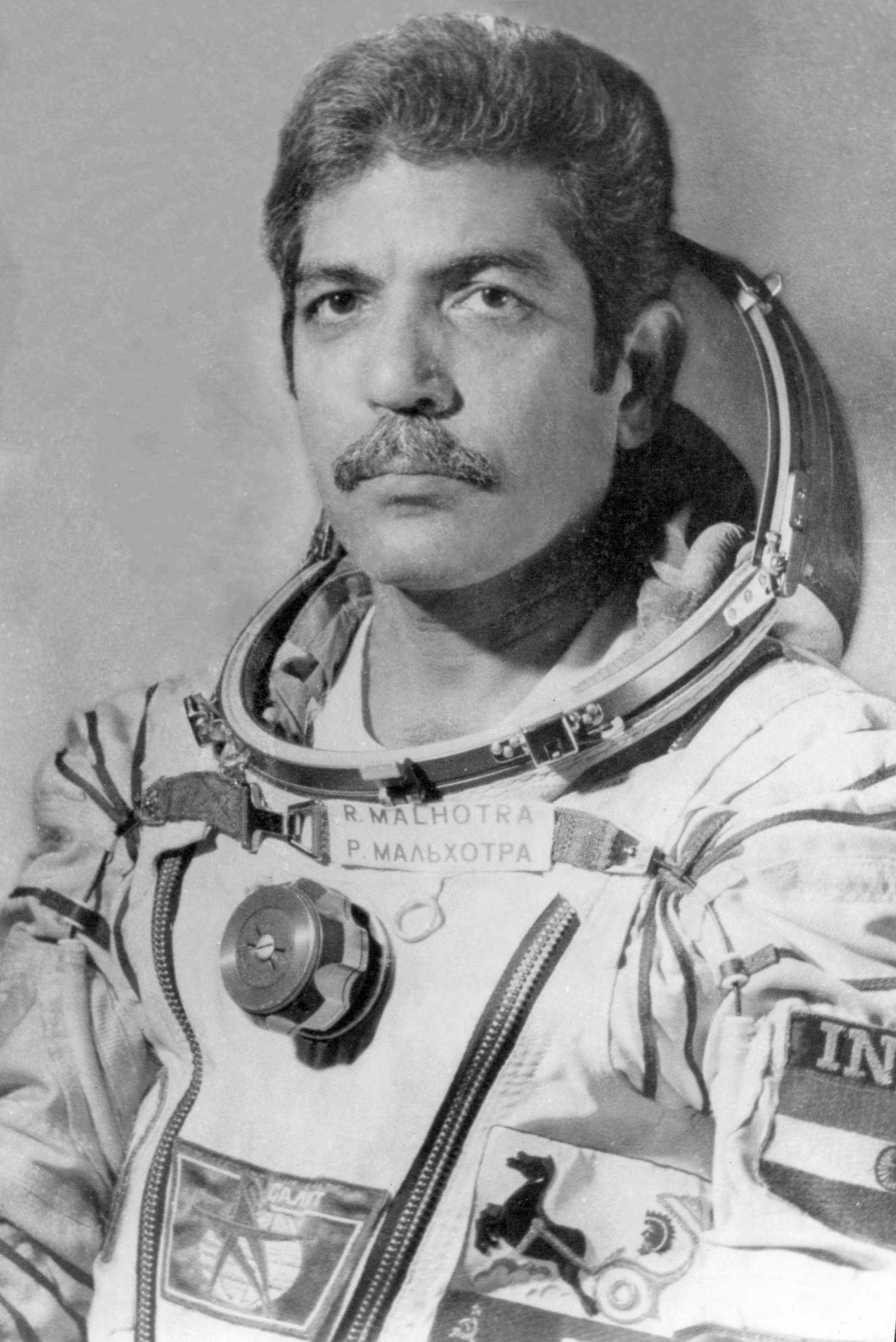
- Born: 25 December 1943 (age 82); Lahore, Punjab, British India
- Status: Retired
- Education: National Defence Academy
- Occupation: Test Pilot
- Awards: Kirti Chakra; Soviet Order of Friendship of Peoples
- Space career

Intercosmos Research Cosmonaut
- Selection: 1982
- Missions: Soyuz T-11
- Military career
- Spouse: Mira Malhotra
- Children: 2
- Allegiance: India
- Branch: Indian Air Force
- Service years: 1963 to 1994
- Rank: Air Commodore
- Service number: 7673 F(P)

Ravish Malhotra (born 25 December 1943 in Lahore, British India) is a retired air commodore of the Indian Air Force. He was an Air Force test pilot stationed at the test centre in Bangalore. He was also the Air Officer Commanding of Hindon Air Force Station near Delhi.

In 1982, he was chosen to train for spaceflight in the Soviet Union's Intercosmos program. Malhotra served as backup for Rakesh Sharma on the Soyuz T-11 mission to Salyut 7 space station which launched the first Indian into space, but never went to space himself. Malhotra was awarded the Soviet Order of Friendship of Peoples in 1984 and the Kirti Chakra in 1985.

Chest patch he would have worn if he was on the primary crew assignment for Soyuz T-11

== Early life ==
Malhotra was born on 25 December 1943 in Lahore, in the Punjab Province of British India into a Punjabi Hindu family with three other siblings. His mother was Raj Malhotra and his father was SC Malhotra. His family moved from Lahore to Delhi after India's independence from Britain and the subsequent partition in 1947. The family settled in Calcutta. Malhotra studied at St Thomas School in Calcutta.

== Career ==
=== Early career ===
After graduation, he was admitted to the National Defence Academy (NDA). Speaking of his career choices, he would later say that he had wanted to join the Indian Navy but was instead drafted into the Indian Air Force (IAF). During the selections, he was told that his eyesight was not good enough for the Navy, while the Air Force had a shortage of cadets at the time.

After graduating from the NDA, Malhotra was commissioned as an officer in 1963 and assigned to the Vampire Squadron of the Indian Air Force, flying the De Havilland Vampire. During this period, he was posted to the IAF base in Barrackpore near Calcutta. He progressively graduated to flying other aircraft including the Dassault Mystère, HAL HF-24 Marut, and the Soviet Sukhoi Su-22.

Malhotra was part of the IAF fighter squadron that was tasked with air raids over Pakistan in 1971, after that country had launched strikes on India prior to the Bangladesh Liberation War. He flew the Sukhoi Su-22 in over 17 sorties into Pakistani air space. In one attack in the Chamb-Jaurian sector in what was then Western Pakistan, his plane was at the receiving end of heavy anti-aircraft gunfire, but he nevertheless returned to his air base in India. The war ended with the successful liberation of Bangladesh.

=== Indo-Soviet space program ===
After the war, Malhotra was selected for the U.S. Air Force Test Pilot School at Edwards Air Force Base in California and later to the Indo-Soviet space program, a joint program between India and the former USSR. During this time, he took tests at the Institute of Aerospace Medicine, in Bangalore and later in Moscow. The final tests resulted in Malhotra, Rakesh Sharma, and two other cadets being selected to train for spaceflight in the Soviet Union's Intercosmos program in 1982.

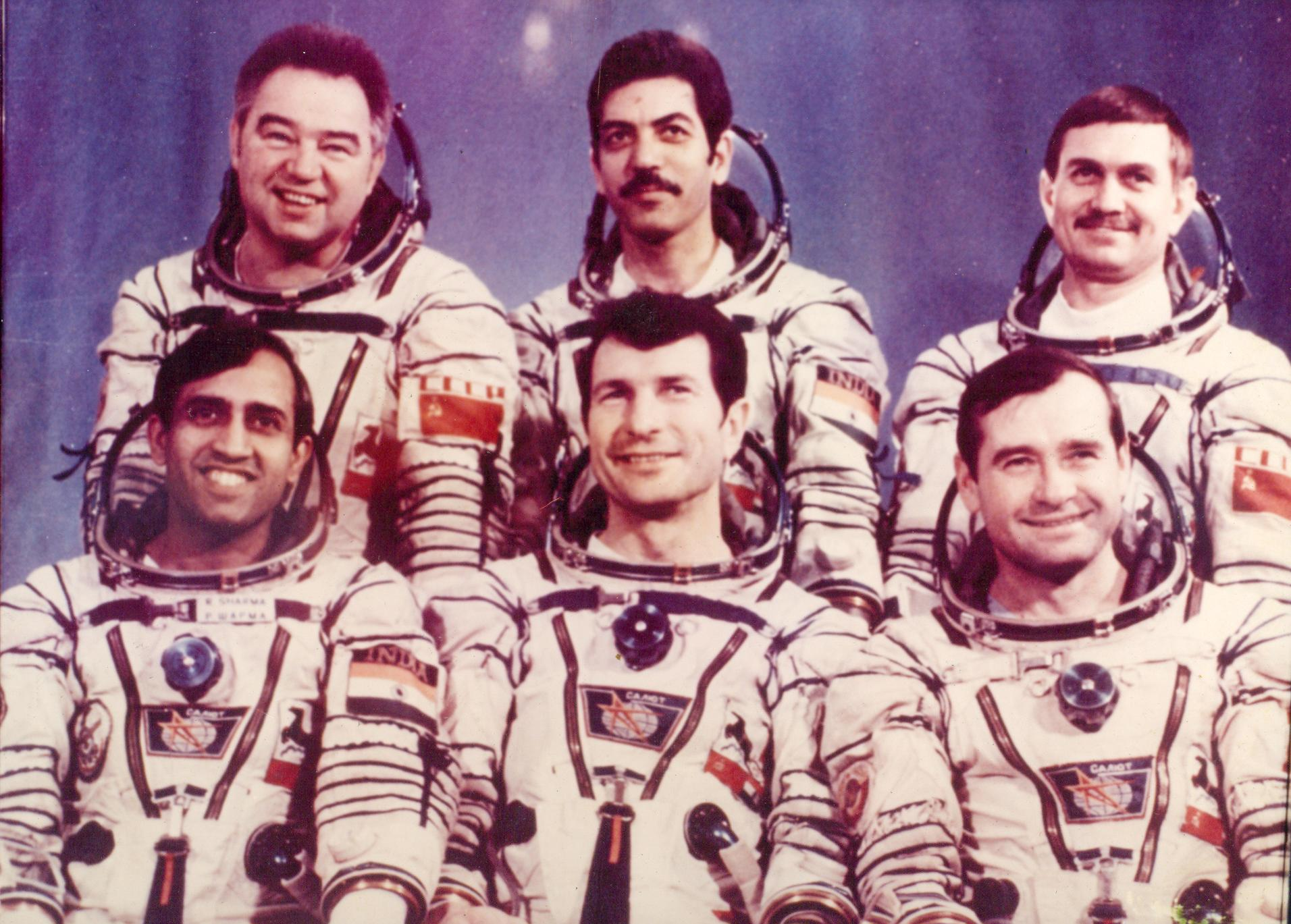
Soyuz T-11 crew (1984). Malhotra is in the middle of the top row.

Malhotra trained at the Yuri Gagarin Cosmonaut Training Center in Star City for over two years. The training and instruction was in Russian since much of the instrumentation and other equipment markings were in Russian. In addition to physical conditioning in preparation for space flight, the cadets also worked on the simulators, as well as flying on the Ilyushin Il-76 aircraft, which simulated near-zero gravity and microgravity conditions for ~50 seconds at a time. Training also included sea recovery and survival, since Soyuz spacecraft capsules landed in the sea. At the end of the training program, Malhotra and Sharma were shortlisted for the Soyuz T-11 mission to launch the first Indian into space in 1984. The two trained on multiple mission objectives, including studying the effects of yoga in space as well as other biomedicine and remote sensing experiments. The decision to have Sharma go to space and Malhotra remain on the ground was taken by the Ministry of Defence in India halfway through the training program. Speaking later about the decision, Malhotra said, "I was disappointed, but you accept it, and move on with the mission". He remained on good terms with Sharma after the mission.

After returning from the Soviet Union, Malhotra was awarded the Soviet Order of Friendship of Peoples in 1984 and Kirti Chakra in 1985.

=== Later career ===
Upon his return to India, he was posted as the commanding officer of the Hindan Air Force Station near the Indian capital of Delhi. He took an early retirement from the Air Force in 1995.

Malhotra entered the private sector, setting up an aerospace manufacturing firm, Dynamatic Aerospace. The NSE-listed company manufactures precision parts, with clients including Boeing, Airbus, and Bell helicopters. He retired from the company at the age of 75.

== Personal life ==
Malhotra is married to Mira Malhotra, a psychologist. The couple have two children. As of 2021 he continues to live in Bangalore in Southern India.
