= Soyuz T-14 =

1985 Soviet crewed spaceflight to Salyut 7

- COSPAR ID: 1985-081A
- SATCAT no.: 16051
- Mission duration: 64 days, 21 hours, 52 minutes, 8 seconds
- Orbits completed: 1,021

Spacecraft properties
- Spacecraft type: Soyuz-T
- Manufacturer: NPO Energia
- Launch mass: 6,850 kilograms (15,100 lb)

Crew
- Crew size: 3
- Members: Vladimir Vasyutin; Alexander Volkov
- Launching: Georgi Grechko
- Landing: Viktor Savinykh
- Callsign: Чегет (Cheget – "Mount Cheget")

Start of mission
- Launch date: September 17, 1985, 12:38:52 UTC
- Rocket: Soyuz-U2
- Launch site: Baikonur 1/5

End of mission
- Landing date: November 21, 1985, 10:31:00 UTC
- Landing site: 180 kilometres (110 mi) SE of Dzhezkazgan

Orbital parameters
- Reference system: Geocentric
- Regime: Low Earth
- Perigee altitude: 196 kilometres (122 mi)
- Apogee altitude: 223 kilometres (139 mi)
- Inclination: 51.6 degrees
- Period: 88.7 minutes

Docking with Salyut 7

Soyuz T-14 (Russian: Союз Т-14, Union T-14) was the ninth expedition to Salyut 7. The mission relieved Soyuz T-13, whose crew had performed unprecedented repairs aboard the previously dead station.

== Crew ==
Position	Launching crew	Landing crew
Commander	Vladimir Vasyutin; Only spaceflight	
Flight engineer	Georgi Grechko; Third and last spaceflight	Viktor Savinykh; Second spaceflight
Research cosmonaut	Alexander Volkov; First spaceflight	

=== Backup crew ===
Position	Crew
Commander	Aleksandr Viktorenko
Flight engineer	Gennady Strekalov
Research cosmonaut	Yevgeni Saley

== Mission parameters ==
- Mass: 6,850 kg (15,100 lb)
- Perigee: 196 km (122 mi)
- Apogee: 223 km (139 mi)
- Inclination: 51.6°
- Period: 88.7 minutes

== Mission highlights ==
Soyuz T-14 demonstrated the wisdom of maintaining a Soyuz at Salyut 7 as an emergency medical evacuation vehicle: the mission commander Vasyutin fell ill which forced an early termination of the planned 6-month mission.

The main goals of the mission was to receive Cosmos 1686, a modified TKS, and conduct spacewalks with application to future space stations. The first goal was achieved on October 2. Cosmos 1686 contained 4,500 kg (9,900 lb) of freight, including large items like a girder to be assembled outside Salyut 7, and the Kristallizator materials processing apparatus. However, the crew of Soyuz T-14 were unable to achieve their second goal. By late October Vasyutin was no longer helping with experiments because he was ill.

On November 13 the cosmonauts began scrambling their communications with the TsUP. Return to Earth occurred soon after. Sources at NASA have reported that psychologists with the Russian Aviation and Space Agency cited Soyuz T-14 as ending prematurely due to "mood and performance issues" with the crew. Vasyutin's illness is said to have been caused by a prostate infection or urinary tract infection, which had manifested itself as inflammation and a fever.
