= Kosmos 1074 =

Unmanned test flight of the Soyuz T spacecraft

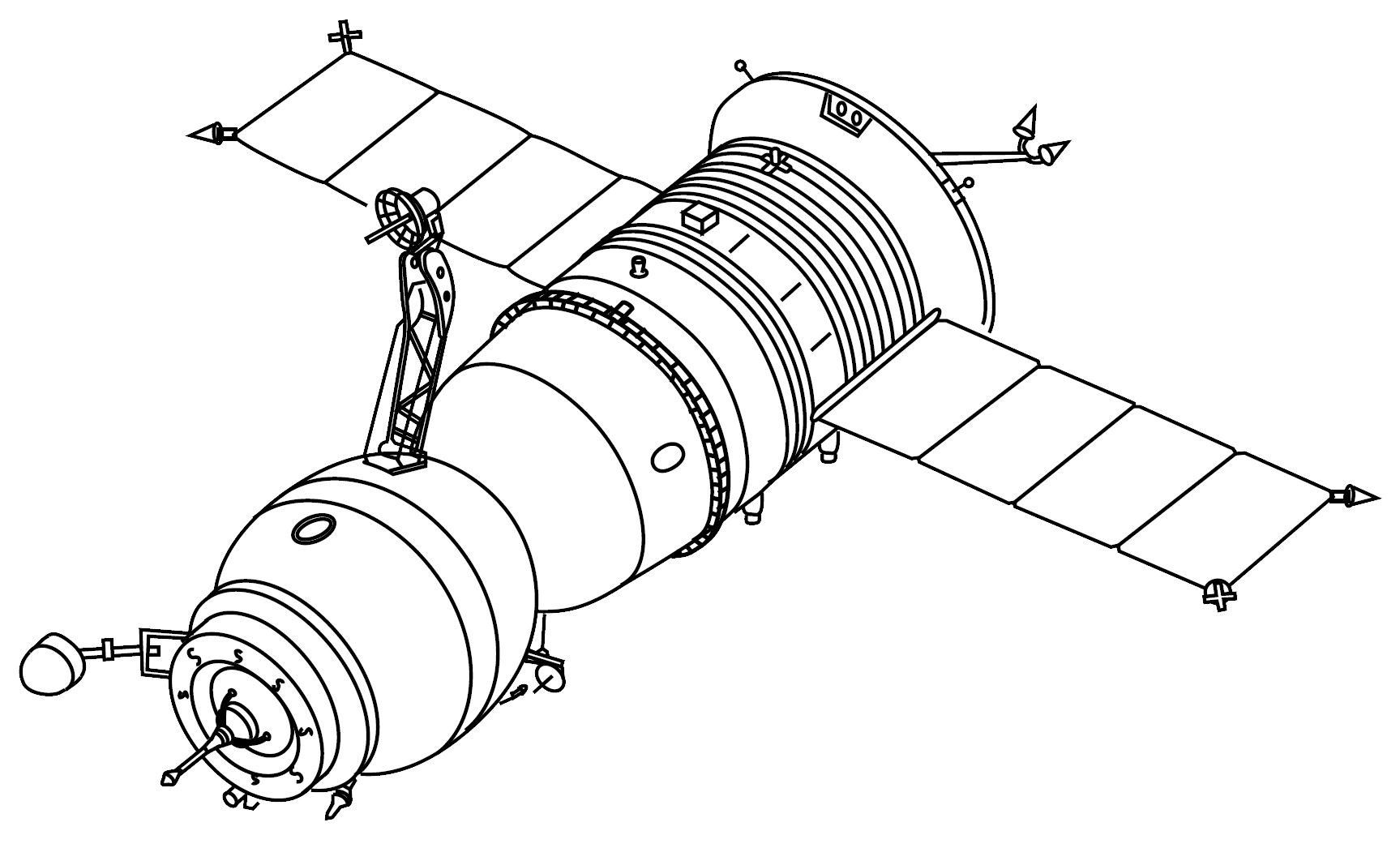
- Soyuz T
- Mission type: Orbital test flight
- Operator: Soviet space program
- COSPAR ID: 1979-008A
- SATCAT no.: 11259
- Mission duration: 60 days, 1 hour and 9 minutes

Spacecraft properties
- Spacecraft: Soyuz-T s/n 5L
- Spacecraft type: Soyuz 7K-ST (11F732)
- Manufacturer: NPO Energia
- Launch mass: 6,450 kg (14,220 lb)

Start of mission
- Launch date: January 31, 1979, 09:00:00 GMT
- Rocket: Soyuz-U
- Launch site: Baikonur 31/6

End of mission
- Disposal: Deorbited
- Landing date: April 1, 1979, 10:09:00 GMT

Orbital parameters
- Reference system: Geocentric
- Perigee altitude: 195 km (121 mi)
- Apogee altitude: 238 km (148 mi)
- Inclination: 51.6°
- Period: 88.8 min

Kosmos 1074 (Russian: Космос 1074 meaning Cosmos 1074) was a Soviet unmanned long-duration test flight of the Soyuz-T spacecraft launched on January 31, 1979, and de-orbited on April 1, 1979. It is the last Soyuz spacecraft that has received a Kosmos designation, and its mission is officially intended to investigate the upper atmosphere and outer space

== Mission parameters ==
- Spacecraft: Soyuz 7K-ST
- Mass: 6450 kg
- Crew: None
- Launched: January 31, 1979
- Landed: April 1, 1979
