= Oleg Atkov =

Soviet-Russian cardiologist and cosmonaut (born 1949)

- Олег Атьков
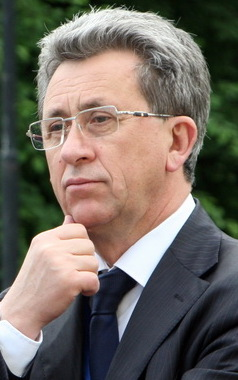
- Born: 9 May 1949 (age 77); Khvorostyanka, USSR
- Occupation: Medical Doctor
- Awards: Hero of the Soviet Union; Order of Lenin
- Space career

Cosmonaut
- Status: Retired
- Time in space: 236d 22h 49m
- Selection: 1983
- Missions: Soyuz T-10/Soyuz T-11 (Salyut 7 EO-3)

Oleg Yur'yevich At'kov (Russian: Оле́г Ю́рьевич Атько́в; born 9 May 1949) is a Russian cardiologist and former Soviet cosmonaut. With a doctorate from the Russian Academy of Medical Science, Atkov was chosen to be the health specialist on board Soyuz T-10 and Soyuz T-11. After Atkov's rather long time in space, he returned to work at the Myasnikov Institute of Clinical Cardiology to continue his research on the adaptation of weightlessness and cardiology. With his published research and time in space, Atkov holds two of the USSR's highest honors; the Order of Lenin and the title of Hero of the Soviet Union. Atkov is a professor of medicine at the Russian National Research Medical University and currently serves as the vice president of Russian Railways.

== Early life ==
Oleg Yur'yevich Atkov was born May 9, 1949, in Khvorostyanka, the former USSR. In 1973, Atkov graduated from I.M. Sechenov First Moscow State Medical University. After his studies at the university, he worked on postgraduate training and received from the Russian Academy of Medical sciences his doctorate in cardiology. Upon receiving his doctorate, Atkov started as a research fellow at the Myasnikov Institute of Clinical Cardiology of the Academy of Sciences and soon became the senior research fellow. He gained some fame in his field when he discovered a method to diagnose cardiovascular diseases using ultrasound.

== Cosmonaut career ==
Atkov is notable for his lengthy time in orbit, with a total flight time of 236 days, 22 hours, and 49 minutes. As a cardiologist, it was his duty to monitor the health of the other cosmonauts on board and to research the long term effects of zero gravity on the human body.

In 1977, Oleg Atkov joined the training group of the Soviet cosmonauts. On September 3, 1983 Dr. Atkov was selected to be part of the AMN selection group along with Ural Sultanov and Magomed Tolboyev. On February 8, 1984 Atkov made a spaceward flight as a cosmonaut-researcher at the spaceship "Soyuz T-10V".

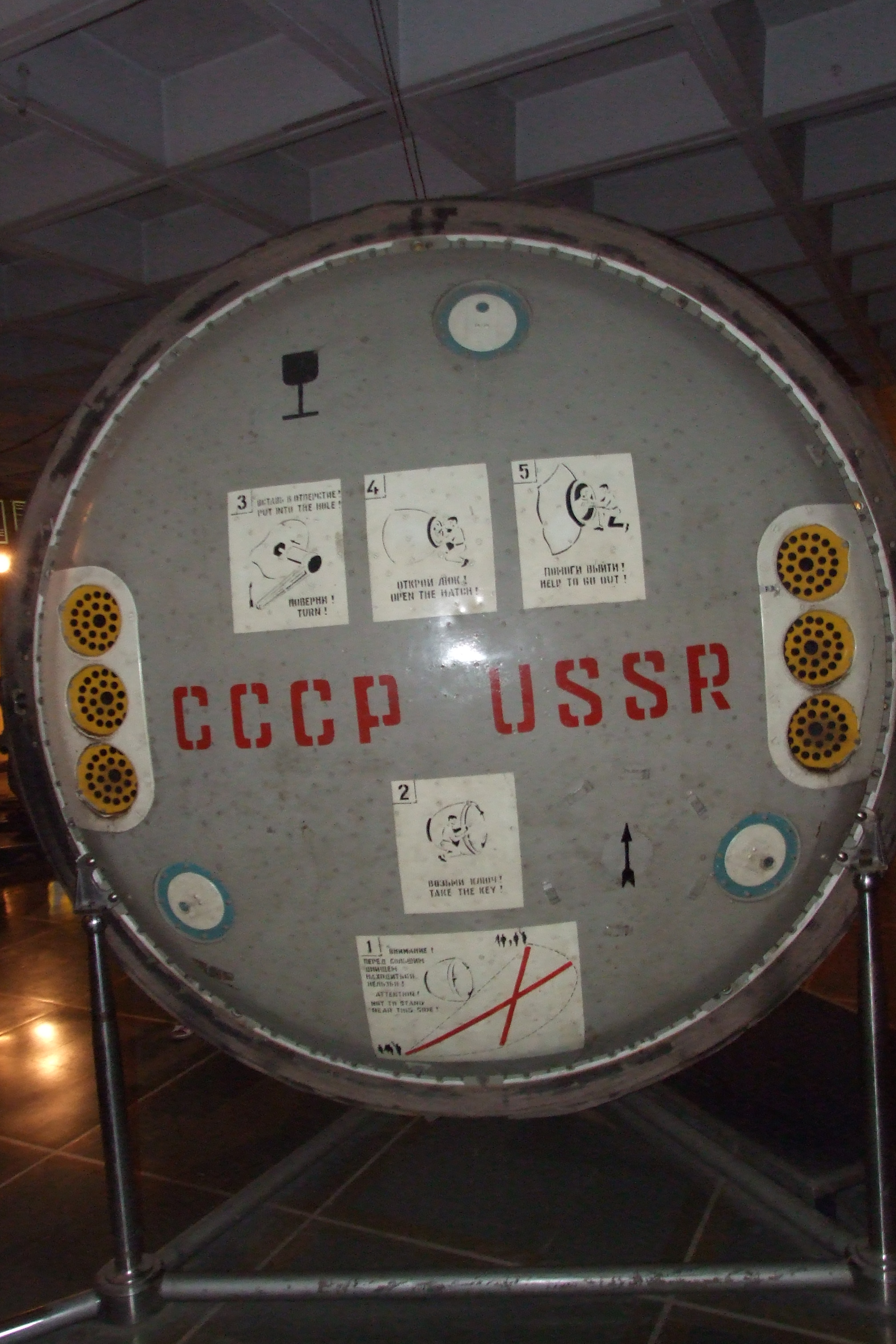
Soyuz T-10 at the Nehru Planetarium, New Delhi, India.

In 1984, a space flight was performed on board the orbital complex Salyut-7-Soyuz-T. The crew consisted of Oleg Atkov (Cosmonaut Researcher), member Leonid Kizim (the commander), and Vladimir Solovyov (the Flight-Engineer). As the cardiologist, Atkov brought with him his own invention—a portable ultrasound cardiograph—which he would use to oversee the crew's health throughout their time in space. The initiative for this team was to continue a major medical task that would advance the study of the acute stage of adaptation to weightlessness, phenomenology, and mechanisms of changes in hemodynamics, metabolism, and other functions. At the end of the Soyuz T-10 expedition, Atkov had estimated a total of 87 days spent on flight dedicated to medical work. When the three cosmonauts landed back on Earth they realized that they had become the new space endurance record holders, staying up in space over a month longer than Soyuz T-5. The crew spent a total of 236 days, 22 hours, and 49 minutes in space.

=== In-space research ===
While in flight, Dr. Atkov had the primary duty of researching the long term effects of space flight such as what happens to the body over the course of a year in zero gravity. Measurements were consecutively taken using echocardiographic and biochemical systems. In addition, studies were conducted on vestibular and sensory organs. In order to avoid muscle deterioration and keep the crew members active, the cosmonauts exercised for an hour twice a day three days in a row, with an "active rest" day in between where they were encouraged to take water-salt supplements.

== Post-cosmonaut career ==
When Atkov returned to Earth he ended his cosmonaut career by retiring on October 2, 1984. Atkov's decision led to the return to the Myasnikov Institute of Clinical Cardiology, where he became Head of Department of new diagnostic methods. Once he finished at the Myasnikov Institute, he soon became the Deputy-Director of the Department of Space Life Science at the International Space University in Strasbourg, France in 1989 to 1996.

During most of his career, Atkov was dedicated to researching the importance of telemedicine. He has since written about 150 published articles and has done several monographs. In addition, Atkov has created 15 inventions and holds several patents. He has helped and supervised 30 candidates from Russia for the Doctor of Medical Science and five candidates for a master's degree in space studies at the International Space University.

After Atkov's time in space, he decided to dedicate most of his work towards the Russian railways and cardiology. Atkov has now been a part of 15 projects that produced a new type of technology to help with cardiology research. He also holds several patents. One invention was a device for positioning cardiograph sensor. This invention had seven other cardiology specialist involved. The main objective was to create something that could hold and maneuver an echocardiograph and an electrocardiograph at the same time while not being in the way. Another notable invention was the Photogrammetrical plotting projector apparatus for radial nadir point triangulation. This invention was to make sure that a Photogrammetrical plotting projector could take what images it needs at the correct angles and explore now angles that images could be taken from. Atkov was not the leader of this project but he helped experiments and design.

=== Russian Railways ===
In 2000, Dr. Atkov became the President of the Russian Telemedicine Association. Two years after this, he would become the Head of the Health Department of the Ministry of Railways of Russian Federation (soon to be reformed to the JSC Russian Railways) where he would promote and continue his work in telemedicine. In August 2005 he was promoted to be the Vice-President Russian Railways JSC while keeping his responsibility and focus in healthcare.

=== Current opinions ===
In a 2012 interview with 3 Eyes Observer, Dr. Atkov was questioned about the future of space exploration. He answered the question by saying that we need to focus on returning to the Moon, but with a different goal than the space race that occurred half a century prior. He told the interviewer that space exploration used to be two superpower nations, the United States and the Soviet Union, racing against each other. However space travel should now be more focused on establishing an international base on the surface of the Moon in order to create an "outpost for Universe observation and solar system observation." Additionally, he added that there should be a focus on reaching Mars as well, but that those two goals should be prepared in safe conditions because of the known hazards that will be found.

== Medical research ==
Once Dr. Atkov returned from space, he participated in many research studies. These studies included coronary heart disease research, The Variations of Intrathoracic Amount of Blood as a Reason of ECG Voltage Changes, and several other projects.

=== Coronary heart disease research ===
Oleg Atkov, and other scientist conducted a research titled the Coronary heart disease diagnosis by artificial neural networks including genetic polymorphisms and clinical parameters. The members of this research include Oleg Yu. Atkov, MD, PhDa, Svetlana G. Gorokhova, MD, PhDb, Alexandr G. Sboev, PhDc, Eduard V. Generozov, PhDd, Elena V. Muraseyeva, MD, PhDe, Svetlana Y. Moroshkinad, and Nadezhda N. Cherniyc.“The goal of this study was to develop an artificial neural networks-based diagnostic model for coronary heart disease using traditional and genetic factors of CHD (Coronary heart disease). In summary, this study was used to create CHD diagnostic models with the appropriate analytical characteristics. These characteristics consisted of using MLP artificial neural networks. The best accuracy was provided in models that had both genetic and non-genetic factors associated with CHD. The models that had less than a 90% accuracy could potentially serve as a basis for development of software tools for diagnosis and predictors for CHD.

=== The effect of ECG Voltage Changes on Variations of Intrathoracic Amount of Blood ===
Oleg Atkov participated in a study titled The Variations of Intrathoracic Amount of Blood as a Reason of ECG Voltage Changes. Marina Saltykova Ph.D.1, Andre Capderou M.D., Ph.D.2, Oleg Atkov M.D.1, Victor Gusakov M.S.3, Gennagiy Konovalov M.S.3, Leonid Voronin M.D.3, Rustem Kaspranskiy M.D.3, Valeriy Morgun M.D.3, Olivier Bailliart M.D., Ph.D.4, Milan Cermack M.D.5 and Pierre Vaïda M.D.6 were the members of this team. “The main goal of the study was to estimate the influence of the variations of thoracic electroconduction, and heart volume on QRS voltage in humans due to gravity change.” The balance between changes of degree of short circuiting by changes in the amount of blood in thorax and the changes of distance between heart and electrodes as a result of position, form, and volume of the heart are what influence the steadiness.

=== Atkov's inventions ===
After Atkov's time in space, he dedicated most of his work towards the Russian railways and cardiology. Within the cardiology field, Atkov has been a part of 15 major projects that has helped advance the types of technology in cardiology research. He also holds several patents for inventions he produced or helped develop. One of his major inventions was a device for positioning a cardiograph sensor. This invention had seven other cardiology specialist involved. The main objective was to create something that could hold and maneuver an Echocardiograph and an Electrocardiograph at the same time while not being in the way of physicians. This device has paved the way towards greater and more advanced technology for better ultrasound techniques. Another notable invention was the Photogrammetrical plotting projector apparatus for radial nadir point triangulation. This invention was to make sure that a Photogrammetrical plotting projector could take what images it needs at the correct angles and explore new angles that images could be taken from. This device helped physicians and patients take difficult images that may not have been possible before. Attkov was not the patent holder for this device but he was the head for the design and prototype. Atkov has been a part of many other cardiology technology developments but most were small or did not impact the cardiology field as much as the device for positioning a cardiograph sensor or the Photogrammetrical plotting projector apparatus for radial nadir point triangulation.

== Honours and awards ==
- Title of Hero of the Soviet Union
- Title of Pilot-Cosmonaut of the USSR
- Order of Lenin
- Medal "For Merit in Space Exploration" (Russian Federation)
- State Prize of the USSR
- Lenin Komsomol Prize
- Honoured Scientist of Russian Federation
- Kirti Chakra (India)

== Bibliography ==
1. "Oleg J. Atkov, Moscow/RU." European Society of Radiology. European Society of Radiology, 2014. Web.

https://www.myesr.org/cms/website.php?id=/en/about_esr_ecr/about_esr_-_european_society_of_radiology/honours/honorary_lecturers/oleg_j_atkov_moscow_ru.htm >

2. "Atkov." Cosmonaut Biography: Oleg. N.p., n.d. Web. 18 Mar. 2016.

https://www.spacefacts.de/bios/cosmonauts/english/atkov_oleg.htm

3. "Encyclopedia Astronautica Atkov." Atkov. N.p., n.d. Web. 18 Mar. 2016.

https://web.archive.org/web/20131108161413/http://astronautix.com/astros/atkov.htm

5. "Oleg Jurjewitsch Atkov." Oleg Jurjewitsch Atkov. N.p., n.d. Web. 18 Mar. 2016.

http://ysa.meduniwien.ac.at/phd-symposium/previous-phd-symposia/phd-symposium-2015/keynote-speakers-2015/oleg-jurjewitsch-atkov/>.

6. "Oleg Atkov, Secretary General of the WPF "Dialogue of Civilizations"" World Public Forum – Dialogue of Civilizations. N.p., n.d. Web. 18 Mar. 2016.http://wpfdc.org/about-us/about/128-management-and-headquarters/18511-oleg-atkov-secretary-general-of-the-wpf-dialogue-of-civilizations

7. "The Story of Space Station Mir." Google Books. N.p., n.d. Web. 18 Mar. 2016.

https://books.google.com/books?id=sBdUh8WqEfYC&pg=PA122&lpg=PA122&dq=oleg%2Batkov&source=bl&ots=T2CIJhwh-P&sig=eXj21FHAJTcgX-9rtWI8HUTF2Fs&hl=en&sa=X&ved=0ahUKEwjvmtb4n6LLAhUERSYKHZ3dBa04FBDoAQgkMAI#v=onepage&q=oleg%20atkov&f=false>.

8. Evans, Ben. Tragedy and Triumph in Orbit: The Eighties and Early Nineties. New York: Springer, 2012. Print.

https://books.google.com/books?id=k_uZiCp5icUC&dq=Tragedy+and+Triumph+in+Orbit%3A+The+Eighties+and+Early+Nineties&pg=PP1

9. Pultarová, Tereza. "We Should Return to the Moon Says Oleg Atkov (Interview)." 3 Eyes Observer. N.p., 5 Mar. 2012. Web. <http://www.3eyesobserver.com/articles/astronautscosmonauts/we-should-return-to-the-moon-says-oleg-atkov-interview >.

11. "Result Filters." National Center for Biotechnology Information. U.S. National Library of Medicine, n.d. Web. 18 Mar. 2016.

12. "Praxis Manned Spaceflight Log 1961-2006." Google Books. N.p., n.d. Web. 05 Apr. 2016.

https://books.google.com/books?id=YbYDn1Spf9oC&dq=Oleg+atkov&pg=PA287
