= Khvorostyanka =

Khvorostyanka (Russian: Хворостянка) is the name of several rural localities in Russia:

- Khvorostyanka, Belgorod Oblast, a selo in Gubkinsky District of Belgorod Oblast
- Khvorostyanka, Dubovskoy Selsoviet, Dobrinsky District, Lipetsk Oblast, a selo in Dubovskoy Selsoviet of Dobrinsky District of Lipetsk Oblast
- Khvorostyanka, Khvorostyansky Selsoviet, Dobrinsky District, Lipetsk Oblast, a railway station in Khvorostyansky Selsoviet of Dobrinsky District of Lipetsk Oblast
- Khvorostyanka, Kursk Oblast, a village in Lipovsky Selsoviet of Cheremisinovsky District of Kursk Oblast
- Khvorostyanka, Moscow Oblast, a village in Znamenskoye Rural Settlement of Kashirsky District of Moscow Oblast
- Khvorostyanka, Oryol Oblast, a village in Khvorostyansky Selsoviet of Novosilsky District of Oryol Oblast
- Khvorostyanka, Samara Oblast, a selo in Khvorostyansky District of Samara Oblast
- Khvorostyanka, Tula Oblast, a village in Ivanovskaya Volost of Kurkinsky District of Tula Oblast
