= Soyuz T-11 =

1984 Soviet crewed spaceflight to Salyut 7

- Mission Patch, depicting the Hindu sun god Surya in his chariot.
- COSPAR ID: 1984-032A
- SATCAT no.: 14872
- Mission duration: 181 days, 21 hours, 48 minutes,
- Orbits completed: ~2,935

Spacecraft properties
- Spacecraft type: Soyuz-T
- Manufacturer: NPO Energia
- Launch mass: 6,850 kilograms (15,100 lb)
- Landing mass: 2,800 kilograms (6,200 lb)

Crew
- Crew size: 3
- Launching: Yury Malyshev; Gennady Strekalov; Rakesh Sharma
- Landing: Leonid Kizim; Vladimir Solovyov; Oleg Atkov
- Callsign: Jupiter

Start of mission
- Launch date: 3 April 1984, 13:08:00 UTC
- Rocket: Soyuz-U
- Launch site: Baikonur 31/6

End of mission
- Landing date: 2 October 1984, 10:57:00 UTC
- Landing site: 46 kilometres (29 mi) E of Arkalyk

Orbital parameters
- Reference system: Geocentric
- Regime: Low Earth
- Perigee altitude: 195 kilometres (121 mi)
- Apogee altitude: 224 kilometres (139 mi)
- Inclination: 51.6 degrees
- Period: 88.7 minutes

Docking with Salyut 7

Soyuz T-11 was the sixth expedition to the Soviet Salyut 7 space station, which in 1984 carried the first Indian cosmonaut, Rakesh Sharma along with Soviet crew members.

Salyut 7 was uncrewed after the undocking of Soyuz T-11 in October 1984 until Soyuz T-13 docked with the station in June 1985. Salyut 7 developed problems during the time it was uncrewed, which meant that the crew of Soyuz T-13 had to perform a manual docking and do repairs to the station.

== Crew ==
| Position | Launching crew | Landing crew |
|---|---|---|
| Commander | Yuri Malyshev; Second and last spaceflight | Leonid Kizim; Second spaceflight |
| Flight engineer | Gennady Strekalov; Third spaceflight | Vladimir Solovyov; First spaceflight |
| Research cosmonaut | Rakesh Sharma, India; Only spaceflight | Oleg Atkov; Only spaceflight |

=== Backup crew ===
| Position | Crew |
|---|---|
| Commander | Anatoly Berezovoy |
| Flight engineer | Georgy Grechko |
| Research cosmonaut | Ravish Malhotra, India |

== Mission parameters ==
- Mass: 6850 kg
- Perigee: 195 km
- Apogee: 224 km
- Inclination: 51.6°
- Period: 88.7 minutes

== Mission highlights ==
Rakesh Sharma, aboard Salyut 7 for 7 days, 21 hours, and 40 minutes, conducted an Earth observation program concentrating on India. He also did life sciences and materials processing experiments, including silicium fusing tests. He is also reported to have experimented with practicing yoga to deal with the effects of prolonged orbital spaceflight.

The Soyuz T-11 launch crew Malyshev, Strekalov, and Sharma returned from space in the Soyuz T-10 spacecraft on 11 April 1984.
