= Rakesh Sharma =

First Indian to travel to space (born 1949)

Wing Commander Rakesh Sharma AC
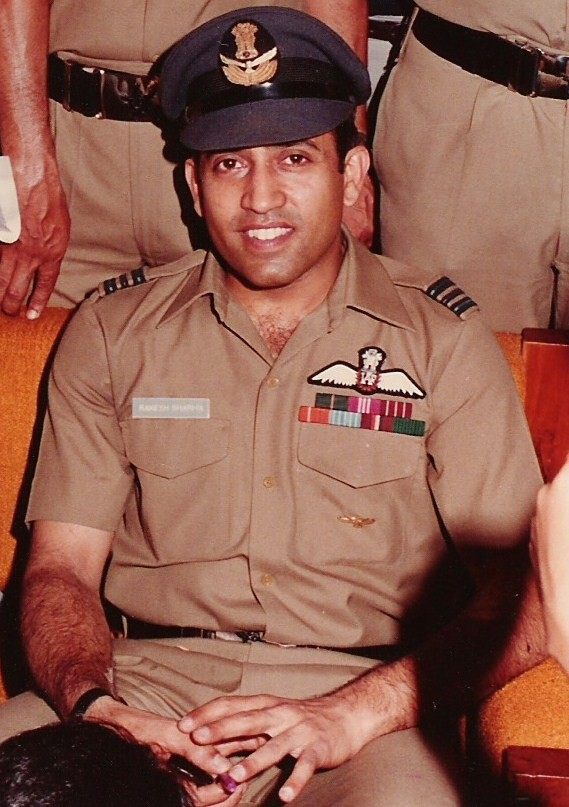
- Sharma as a Squadron leader
- Born: 13 January 1949 (age 77); Patiala, Patiala and East Punjab States Union, Dominion of India (now in Punjab, India)
- Status: Retired
- Education: National Defence Academy; Air Force Academy
- Occupations: Fighter pilot at IAF; Research cosmonaut at ISRO; Test pilot at HAL
- Space career

Indian cosmonaut
- Time in space: 7 days, 21 hours, 40 minutes
- Selection: 1982 Intercosmos (India)
- Mission: Soyuz T-11 (launching); Soyuz T-10 (landing)
- Military career
- Spouse: Madhu Sharma
- Children: 3
- Allegiance: India
- Branch: Indian Air Force
- Service years: 1970 – 1990
- Rank: Wing Commander
- Service number: 12396 F(P)
- Conflicts: 1971 Indo-Pakistani War
- Awards: Ashok Chakra; Hero of the Soviet Union

Wing Commander Rakesh Sharma, AC (born 13 January 1949) is an Indian cosmonaut and a pilot of the Indian Air Force. He became the first Indian to travel to outer space, when he flew aboard Soyuz T-11 on 3 April 1984 as part of the Soviet Interkosmos programme.

== Early and personal life ==
Rakesh Sharma was born on 13 January 1949 in Patiala into a Punjabi family. He attended St. George's Grammar School and graduated from Nizam College, Hyderabad. He joined the National Defence Academy as an air force plebe in July 1966.

Sharma married Madhu, and the couple have three children including film director Kapil Sharma and media artist Krittika Sharma.

== Career ==
Sharma was commissioned into the Indian Air Force (IAF) as a pilot in 1970. He flew 21 combat missions piloting the Mikoyan-Gurevich MiG-21 during the Bangladesh Liberation War in 1971. In 1984, he was promoted to the rank of squadron leader. On 20 September 1982, he was selected for space travel as part of a joint programme between the IAF and the Soviet Interkosmos space agency.

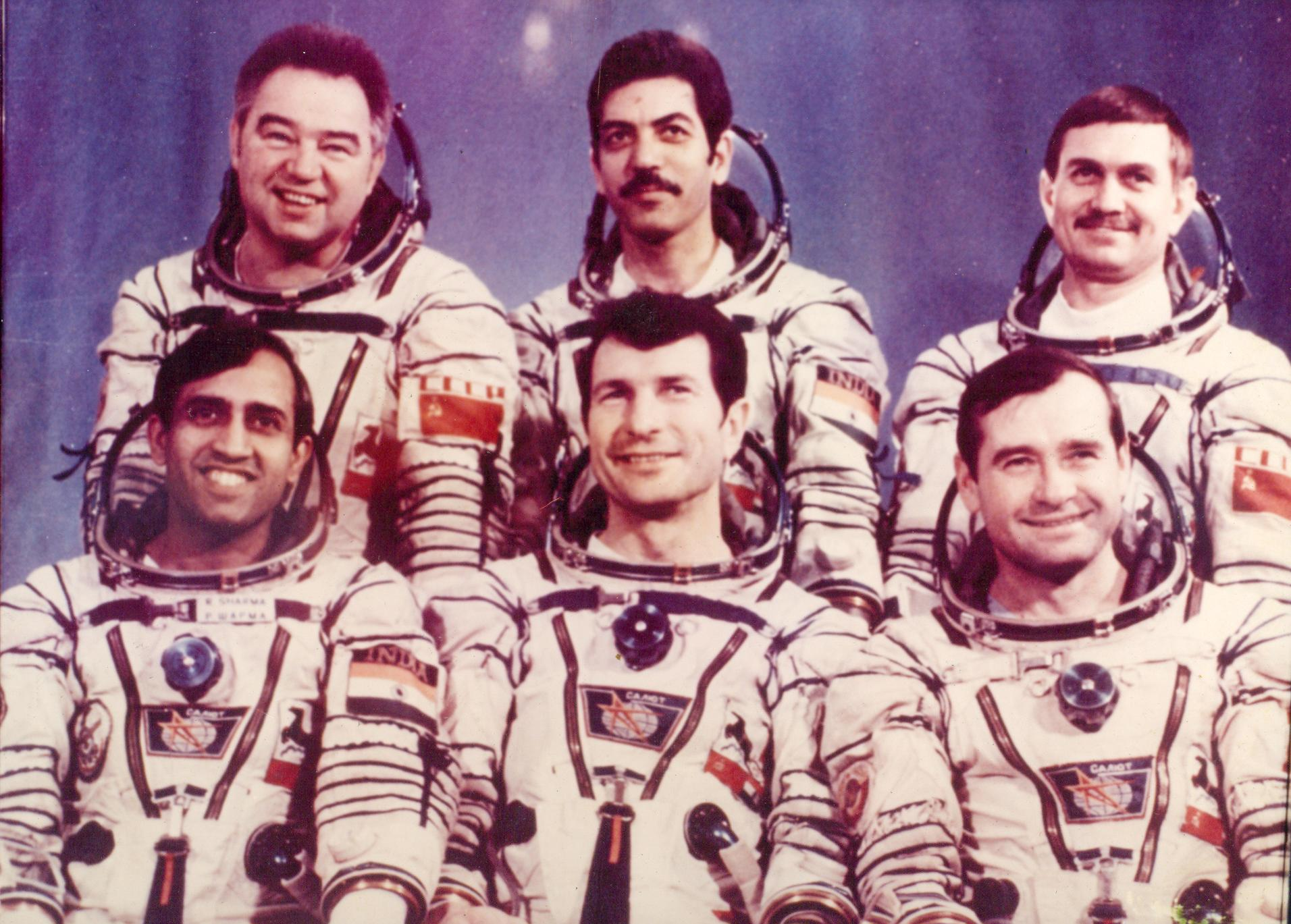
Soyuz T-11 flight and back up crew with Sharma (bottom left)

Sharma became the first Indian to travel to outer space when he flew aboard the Soviet Soyuz T-11 mission, launched from Baikonur Cosmodrome in the Kazakh Soviet Socialist Republic on 3 April 1984. The Soyuz-T spacecraft carried a three member crew, consisting of the ship's commander Yury Malyshev, flight engineer Gennadi Strekalov, and Sharma as a research cosmonaut. It docked with the Salyut 7 orbital station, and Sharma spent 7 days, 21 hours, and 40 minutes aboard the Salyut 7 during which his team conducted scientific and technical studies which included forty-three experimental sessions. His work was mainly in the fields of bio-medicine and remote sensing. The crew landed back on 11 April 1984. After landing, the crew held a joint news conference at Moscow in the presence of Soviet officials and then Indian prime minister Indira Gandhi. When Gandhi asked Sharma how India looked from outer space, he replied, "Sare Jahan Se Accha" (better than the whole world), in a reference to a poem by Allama Iqbal. With Sharma's voyage, India became the 14th nation to send a man to outer space.

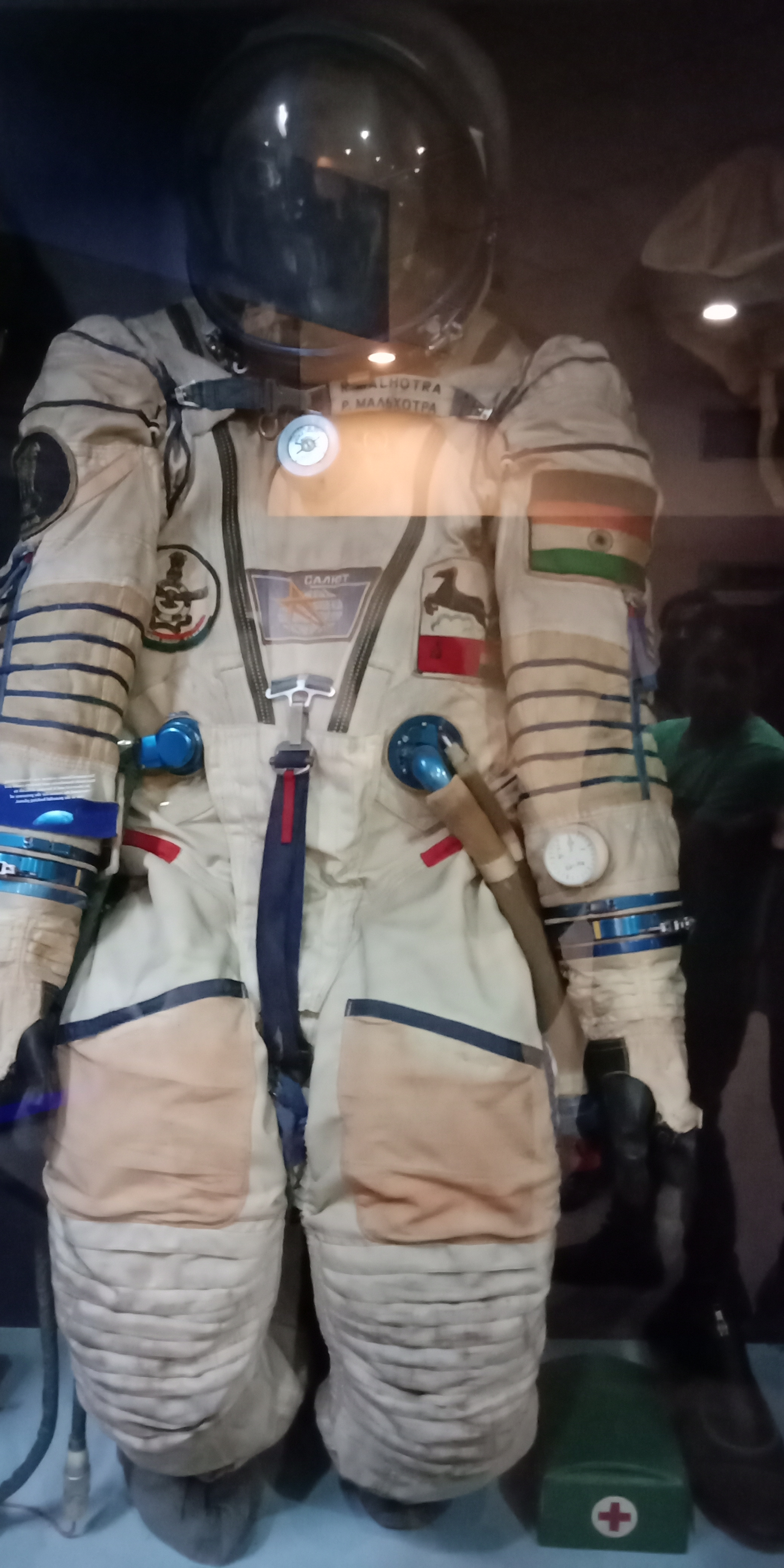
Cosmonaut Rakesh Sharma's suit at Nehru Planetarium

Sharma retired as a wing commander from the IAF and later joined Hindustan Aeronautics Limited (HAL) in 1987. He initially served as the chief test pilot at the HAL division at Nashik before moving to Bangalore to work as the company's chief test pilot. He retired from flying in 2001.

== Awards and decorations ==
Sharma was conferred the honour of the Hero of the Soviet Union upon his return from space, and is the only Indian to have been conferred this honour. India also conferred its highest peacetime gallantry award, the Ashoka Chakra, on him and the two Soviet members of his mission, Malyshev and Strekalov.

The citation for the Ashoka Chakra reads as follows:

Gazette Notification: No.57-Pres/85 dated 7th May 1985

Date of Award: 3 April 1984

CITATION

SQUADRON LEADER RAKESH SHARMA

(12396) FLYING (PILOT)

In January 1982, when it was decided that an Indian would go into space on a Soviet space ship, Squadron Leader Rakesh Sharma volunteered for this very challenging mission. After a very rigorous selection process, which included a most exacting medical test, he was selected as one of the two cosmonaut candidates from among 150 highly qualified and experienced pilots of the Indian Air Force. After his selection, he underwent training as a cosmonaut at YURI GAGARIN CENTRE in the USSR, where he applied himself with total devotion and dedication and won acclaim from Soviet Space experts. Squadron Leader Rakesh Sharma completed a most arduous training schedule, with distinction and with exceptional professionalism.

On 3 April 1984, Sqn Ldr Rakesh Sharma became the first Indian to orbit in space. He carried out all the scientific experiments planned for the joint Indo-Soviet Space Mission and other tasks assigned to him with great facility and excellence. Sqn Ldr Sharma has not only carved out a place for himself in the space roll of honour but has brought glory and credit to the nation.

Squadron leader Rakesh Sharma has thus displayed most conspicuous daring and courage to become the first Indian to go into space.

=== Ribbon bar ===

Ashok Chakra	Paschimi Star		Sangram Medal
Sainya Seva Medal	Videsh Seva Medal	25th Anniversary of Independence Medal	9 Years Long Service Medal

== Popular culture ==
A biographical Hindi-language film titled Saare Jahaan Se Achcha (formerly Salute), is under pre-production since 2018.

== See also ==
- Indian human spaceflight programme
- Ravish Malhotra
- Shubhanshu Shukla
