= Soyuz T-8 =

Unsuccessful 1983 Soviet crewed spaceflight to Salyut 7

- COSPAR ID: 1983-035A
- SATCAT no.: 14014
- Mission duration: 2 days, 17 minutes, 48 seconds
- Orbits completed: 32

Spacecraft properties
- Spacecraft type: Soyuz-T
- Manufacturer: NPO Energia
- Launch mass: 6,850 kilograms (15,100 lb)

Crew
- Crew size: 3
- Members: Vladimir Titov; Gennady Strekalov; Aleksandr Serebrov
- Callsign: Okean (Ocean)

Start of mission
- Launch date: April 20, 1983, 13:10:54 UTC
- Rocket: Soyuz-U
- Launch site: Baikonur 1/5

End of mission
- Landing date: April 22, 1983, 13:28:42 UTC
- Landing site: 60 kilometres (37 mi) NE of Arkalyk

Orbital parameters
- Reference system: Geocentric
- Regime: Low Earth
- Perigee altitude: 200 kilometres (120 mi)
- Apogee altitude: 230 kilometres (140 mi)
- Inclination: 51.6 degrees
- Period: 88.6 minutes

Soyuz T-8 was a crewed mission to the Salyut 7 Soviet space station in 1983. Shortly into the mission, the spacecraft failed to dock with the space station due to an incident involving an antenna being torn off the craft by the protective launch shroud. After a fuel-consuming attempt made in darkness for an optical rendezvous with Salyut 7 resulted in an abort in order to avoid collision, it was decided to de-orbit T-8 two days into the mission in order to ensure that the spacecraft had a sufficient amount of propellant for the de-orbit maneuver. After de-orbiting, landing of the craft occurred normally.

== Crew ==
Position	Crew
Commander	Vladimir Titov; First spaceflight
Flight engineer	Gennady Strekalov; Second spaceflight
Research cosmonaut	Aleksandr Serebrov; Second spaceflight

=== Backup crew ===
Position	Crew
Commander	Vladimir Lyakhov
Flight engineer	Aleksandr Aleksandrov
Research cosmonaut	Viktor Savinykh

== Mission parameters ==
- Mass: 6850 kg
- Perigee: 200 km
- Apogee: 230 km
- Inclination: 51.6°
- Period: 88.6 minutes

== Mission highlights ==
Soyuz T-8 failed to dock with Salyut 7 due to problems with the capsule's automated docking system. It was the first failure to dock at a space station since Soyuz 33 in 1979.

Once in orbit, the Soyuz rendezvous radar antenna boom failed to deploy properly. Several attitude control maneuvers at high rates failed to swing the boom out. The postflight inquiry later discovered that the antenna had been torn off when the Soyuz payload shroud separated. However, during the flight, the crew believed that the boom was still attached to the spacecraft's orbital module and that it had merely not locked into place. Accordingly, they shook the spacecraft using its attitude thrusters in an effort to rock it forward so it could lock.

With FCC permission, the crew attempted a rendezvous using only an optical sight and ground radar inputs for guidance. During the final approach, which was made in darkness, Titov believed that the closing speed was too great. He attempted a braking maneuver but felt that the two spacecraft were still closing too fast. He aborted the rendezvous to avoid a crash, and no further attempts were made. The abortive docking attempts consumed much propellant. To ensure that enough would remain to permit deorbit, the cosmonauts shut down the attitude control system and put Soyuz T-8 into a spin-stabilized mode of the type used by Soyuz Ferries in the early 1970s. The three men returned to Earth after a flight lasting just 2 days, 17 minutes, 48 seconds, and the landing proceeded normally.
