= Soyuz 7K-ST No.16L =

Aborted 1983 Soviet crewed spaceflight

- Explosion of Soyuz 7K-ST No.16L
- Names: Soyuz T-10a, Soyuz T-10-1
- Mission type: Salyut 7 crew transport
- Operator: OKB-1
- Mission duration: 5 minutes and 13 seconds

Spacecraft properties
- Spacecraft: Soyuz 7K-ST No.16L
- Spacecraft type: Soyuz 7K-ST
- Manufacturer: OKB-1
- Launch mass: 6850 kg
- Landing mass: 2800 kg

Crew
- Crew size: 2
- Members: Vladimir Titov; Gennadi Strekalov
- Callsign: Okean (Ocean)

Start of mission
- Launch date: 26 September 1983, 19:37:49 UTC
- Rocket: Soyuz-U s/n Yu15000-363
- Launch site: Baikonur, Site 1/5

End of mission
- Landing date: 26 September 1983, 19:43:02 UTC
- Landing site: Baikonur (4 km or 2.5 mi away from the launch site)

Orbital parameters
- Reference system: Geocentric orbit (planned)
- Regime: Low Earth orbit

Soyuz 7K-ST No.16L, sometimes known as Soyuz T-10a or Soyuz T-10-1, was an unsuccessful Soyuz mission intended to visit the Salyut 7 space station, which was occupied by the Soyuz T-9 crew. However, it never finished its launch countdown; the launch vehicle was destroyed on the launch pad by fire on 26 September 1983. The launch escape system of the Soyuz spacecraft fired six seconds before the launch vehicle exploded, saving the crew. This is the only time a launch escape system has been fired before launch with a crew aboard.

The Soyuz T-10-1 explosion would also remain the only instance of a Russian crewed booster accident in 35 years, until the Soyuz MS-10 flight aborted shortly after launch on 11 October 2018 due to a failure of the Soyuz-FG launch vehicle boosters.

== Crew ==
| Position | Cosmonaut |
|---|---|
| Commander | Vladimir Titov; Would have been second spaceflight |
| Flight engineer | Gennadi Strekalov; Would have been third spaceflight |

== Mission highlights ==
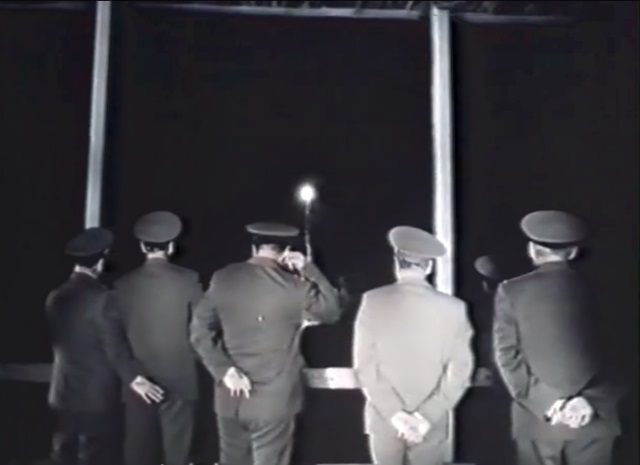
The Soyuz spacecraft narrowly escapes disaster.

The crew was sitting on the pad awaiting fueling of the Soyuz-U booster to complete prior to liftoff. Approximately 90 seconds before the intended launch, a bad valve caused nitrogen pressurisation gas to enter the RP-1 turbopump of the Blok B strap-on. The pump began spinning up, but with no propellant in it, the speed of rotation quickly exceeded its design limits which caused it to rupture and allow RP-1 to leak out and start a fire which quickly engulfed the base of the launch vehicle. Titov and Strekalov could not see what was happening outside, but they felt unusual vibrations and realized that something was amiss. The launch control team activated the escape system but the control cables had already burned through, and the Soyuz crew could not activate or control the escape system themselves. The backup radio command to fire the LES required two independent operators to receive separate commands to do so and each act within five seconds, which took several seconds to occur. Explosive bolts then fired to separate the descent module from the service module and the upper launch payload shroud from the lower portion, then the escape system motor fired, which dragged the orbital module and descent module, encased within the upper shroud, free of the booster with an acceleration of 14 to 17g (137 to 167 m/s²) for five seconds. According to Titov, "We could feel the booster swaying from side to side. Then there was a sudden vibration and a jerking sensation as the LES activated".

Just after the escape tower pulled the descent module away, the booster exploded. Its remains burned on the pad for nearly 20 hours. Four grid fins on the outside of the shroud opened and the descent module separated from the orbital module at an altitude of 650 metres (2,130 ft), dropping free of the shroud. The descent module discarded its heat shield, exposing the solid-fuel landing rockets, and deployed a fast-opening emergency parachute. Touchdown occurred about four kilometres (2.5 mi) from the launch pad. The two crew members were bruised badly after the high acceleration, but were otherwise in good health and did not require any medical attention. Upon being greeted by recovery crews, they immediately asked for cigarettes to steady their nerves. The cosmonauts were then given a tumbler of vodka to help them relax.

The KH-11 reconnaissance satellites returned photos of the damaged Site 1 in several runs during late 1983 and early 1984. The descent module was refurbished and later used for Soyuz T-15.

The failure's immediate result was the inability to replace the ageing Soyuz T-9 return capsule attached to the Salyut 7 space station. This resulted in dire reports in the western media about the cosmonauts remaining aboard Salyut 7 (which had arrived several months before in the Soyuz T-9) being 'stranded' in space, with no ability to return. Official reports by the Soviet news agency TASS gave few details, merely saying that there had been a pad accident and the cosmonauts were rescued by the LES. It was not until several years later during glasnost that the full story of the accident was revealed to the outside world. Years later, in an interview with the United States History Channel regarding the flight, Titov claimed that the crew's first action after the escape rocket fired was to deactivate the spacecraft's cockpit voice recorder because, as he put it, "We were swearing".

== See also ==
- List of spaceflight-related accidents and incidents
- Soyuz 7K-T No.39 – Unsuccessful crewed launch of the Soyuz programme
- Soyuz MS-10 – Aborted 2018 Russian crewed spaceflight
