= Gennady Strekalov =

Soviet-Russian engineer and cosmonaut (1940–2004)

- Геннадий Стрекалов
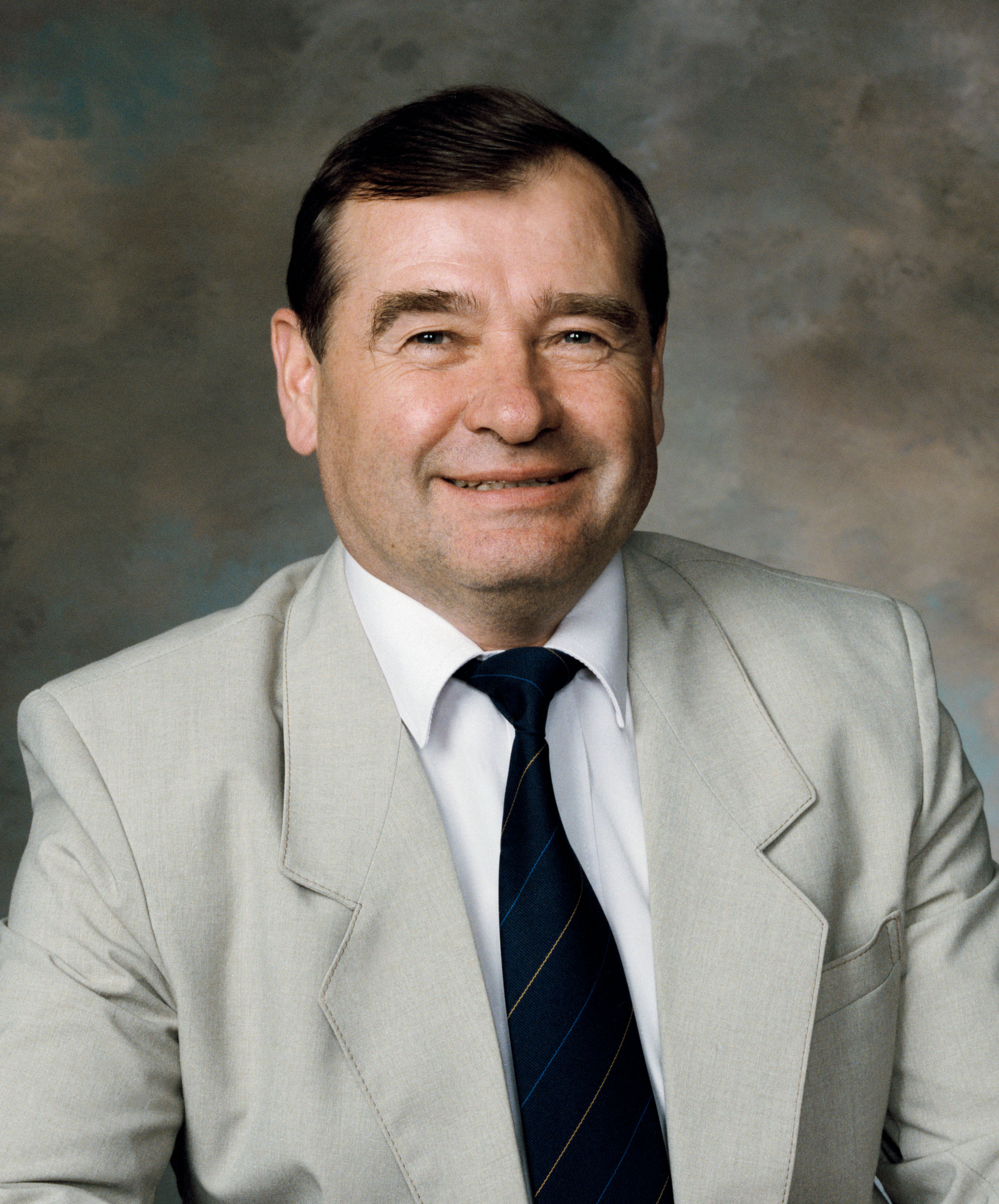
- Born: 26 October 1940; Mytishchi, Soviet Union
- Died: 25 December 2004 (aged 64); Moscow, Russia
- Occupation: Flight Engineer
- Space career

Roscosmos cosmonaut
- Time in space: 268 days 22 hours 22 minutes
- Selection: Civilian Specialist Group 5
- Total EVAs: 6 (1 during Mir EO-7, 5 during Mir EO-18)
- Total EVA time: 22h, 52m
- Missions: Soyuz T-3 (Salyut 6 EO-5), Soyuz T-8 (failed docking with Salyut 7), Soyuz 7K-ST No.16L (vehicle destroyed on the pad, launch abort was activated), Soyuz T-11/Soyuz T-10 (Salyut 7 EP-3), Soyuz TM-10 (Mir EO-7), Soyuz TM-21/STS-71 (Mir EO-18)

Gennady Mikhailovich Strekalov (Russian: Генна́дий Миха́йлович Стрека́лов; 26 October 1940 – 25 December 2004) was an engineer, cosmonaut, and administrator at Russian aerospace firm RSC Energia. He flew into space five times and lived aboard the Salyut 6, Salyut 7, and Mir space stations, spending over 268 days in space. The catastrophic explosion of a Soyuz rocket in 1983 led to him being one of only four people to use a launch escape system. He was decorated twice as Hero of the Soviet Union and received the Ashoka Chakra from India.

== Personal life ==
Strekalov was born on 26 October 1940 in Mytishchi near Moscow, the son of Mikhail Strekalov and his wife Praskoyva. Mikhail Strekalov was killed in 1945 while fighting for the Red Army in Poland. Gennadi Strekalov graduated from N. E. Bauman Moscow Higher Technical School in 1965 with an engineer's diploma. He married Lydia Anatolievna Telezhina; the couple had two daughters, Tatiana and Natalia. He died in Moscow on 25 December 2004, from cancer, aged 64.

== Career ==
After leaving school, Strekalov began work as an apprentice coppersmith at OKB-1, Sergei Korolev's experimental design bureau, where he helped to assemble Sputnik 1. He left to attend university at N. E. Bauman Moscow Higher Technical School, obtaining a degree in technical science. He then returned to OKB-1 (which was later renamed RSC Energia) and worked there for the rest of his life.

As part of an operations group, he participated in mission control for flights of scientific research vehicles belonging to the Academy of Sciences.

In January 1974, he began training as a crew member for a mission aboard the Soyuz spacecraft as a flight engineer and, in 1976, was part of the backup crew for the Soyuz 22 mission. Starting October 1978, he trained as a flight engineer for Soyuz expeditions to Salyut-series space stations.

His first spaceflight was 27 November to 10 December 1980, as research engineer on Soyuz T-3's mission to the Salyut 6 station.

His next flight was to be new Salyut 7 space station. He and Vladimir Titov were the backup crew for the Soyuz T-5 mission, the first flight to the new station. The pair, together with Aleksandr Serebrov, launched in April 1983 on Soyuz T-8. As the spacecraft separated from the aerodynamic fairing that shielded it during launch, part of its Igla rendezvous radar system was damaged. The crew attempted a manual docking, using only optical instruments aboard their spacecraft and guided by ground radar, but the approach was unsuccessful and Titov had to brake and dive to avoid a collision. Having used up too much of their propellant to attempt another approach, the crew were forced to return to Earth on 22 April 1983.

Strekalov and Titov were again scheduled to fly to Salyut 7 on 26 September 1983. The mission's Soyuz-U launcher developed a serious fuel leak in the minutes before launch, forcing launch control to attempt to fire the launch escape system to pull the spacecraft away from the rocket to safety. This initially failed, but finally operated only 20 seconds before the rocket exploded, devastating Baikonur's Site 1 pad. Strekalov and Titov's capsule was dragged (at accelerations of more than 10 G) to safety and landed 4 km (2.5 mi) from the pad, its occupants bruised but otherwise uninjured. Strekalov and Titov's narrow escape was the first ever live use of a launch escape system in the history of human spaceflight. Titov and Strekalov would subsequently celebrate the anniversary of their dramatic escape, calling it their "second birthday". As it did not launch, the mission is known by its technical article designation Soyuz 7K-ST No.16L; it would have been Soyuz T-10, a codename that was instead used the following year.

Strekalov's next spaceflight was aboard Soyuz T-11, with Yuri Malyshev and Indian cosmonaut Rakesh Sharma. The flight launched from Baikonur's Site 31 on 3 April 1984 and, unlike Strekalov's previous two attempts, successfully docked with Salyut-7. The crew stayed on Salyut-7 until 11 April 1984, and returned to Earth not in the spacecraft in which they had come, but in the reentry module of Soyuz T-10, which was already docked at the space station.

From 1 August to 10 December 1990, he was the flight engineer on Soyuz TM-10's flight to Mir, with Gennady Manakov and Japanese reporter-cosmonaut Toyohiro Akiyama. At 130 days, this was his longest spaceflight.

After this, Strekalov formally retired and became head of the civilian section of the cosmonaut department. But he returned to flight status for the Shuttle–Mir Program and on 14 March 1995 he flew on Soyuz TM-21 to the Mir space station, accompanied by Vladimir Dezhurov and American astronaut Norman Thagard. The mission, designated EO-18, was the first non-US launch to carry an American into space. Although successful, Strekalov's time on Mir was fraught - the crew undertook a number of taxing spacewalks to repair the station, culminating in a dispute when mission controllers ordered an unplanned spacewalk to repair a stuck solar array. Strekalov, believing the proposal to be too dangerous, refused to perform it, and argued with his colleagues on the ground for several days until they acquiesced. On 7 July 1995, the Soyuz TM-21 crew returned to Earth, not on the Soyuz that had brought them, but aboard US Space Shuttle Atlantis (STS-71) which had brought their relief. Overall the mission lasted 115 days. Due to Strekalov's refusal, he was fined approximately US$10,000 in pension and benefit entitlements, but he took RSC Energia to arbitration and had the fine overturned.

Strekalov continued to work for RSC Energia until his death.

== Awards and honors ==
- Hero of the Soviet Union, twice (10 December 1980, 11 April 1984)
- Order of Merit for the Fatherland, 3rd class (7 September 1995) - for active participation in the preparation and successful implementation of long-term US-Russian space flight on the orbital scientific research complex Mir, displaying courage and heroism
- Three Orders of Lenin (10 December 1980, 1983, 11 April 1984)
- Order of the October Revolution (10 December 1990) - for the successful implementation of spaceflight on the orbital scientific research complex Mir and displaying courage and heroism
- Medal "Veteran of Labour"
- Ashoka Chakra, Class I (India, 1984)
- NASA Space Flight Medal (1995)
- Honoured Master of Sports (1981)
- Honorary Citizen of Queens (United States) and Mytischi (Russia)
- Pilot-Cosmonaut of the USSR
