= Gennady Manakov =

Soviet and Russian cosmonaut (1950–2019)

- Геннадий Манаков
- Born: Gennady Mikhailovich Manakov; 1 June 1950; Yefimovka, Russian SFSR, Soviet Union
- Died: 26 September 2019 (aged 69)
- Occupation: Test pilot
- Awards: Hero of the Soviet Union; Order of Lenin; Order of Military Merit; Order of Friendship of Peoples; Medal "For Merit in Space Exploration"
- Space career

Roscosmos cosmonaut
- Rank: Colonel, Soviet Air Force
- Time in space: 309d 21h 18m
- Selection: 1985
- Total EVAs: 3 (1 during Mir EO-7, 2 during Mir EO-13)
- Total EVA time: 13h, 46m
- Missions: Soyuz TM-10 (Mir EO-7) Soyuz TM-16 (Mir EO-13)

Gennady Mikhailovich Manakov (Russian: Геннадий Михайлович Манаков; 1 June 1950 – 26 September 2019) was a Soviet and Russian cosmonaut who commanded two Soyuz flights to the Mir space station.

He was born in Yefimovka, Chkalov Oblast, Russian SFSR, on 1 June 1950. He was selected on 2 September 1985 and flew as Commander on Soyuz TM-10 and Soyuz TM-16, before retiring on 20 December 1996. He was married with two children. He died on 26 September 2019 according to a statement from his friend, Cosmonaut Maksim Surayev.

== Awards ==
- Hero of the Soviet Union
- Pilot-Cosmonaut of the USSR
- Order of Military Merit
- Order of Lenin
- Order of Friendship of Peoples
- Medal "For Merit in Space Exploration"
- Officer of the Legion of Honour (France)
