= Soyuz TM-10 =

1990 Soviet crewed spaceflight to Mir

- COSPAR ID: 1990-067A
- SATCAT no.: 20722
- Mission duration: 130 days, 20 hours, 35 minutes, 51 seconds
- Orbits completed: ~2,125

Spacecraft properties
- Spacecraft type: Soyuz-TM
- Manufacturer: NPO Energia
- Launch mass: 7,150 kilograms (15,760 lb)

Crew
- Crew size: 2 up 3 down
- Members: Gennady Manakov; Gennady Strekalov
- Landing: Toyohiro Akiyama
- Callsign: Вулка́н (Vulkan – Volcano)

Start of mission
- Launch date: 1 August 1990, 09:32:21 UTC
- Rocket: Soyuz-U2

End of mission
- Landing date: 10 December 1990, 06:08:12 UTC
- Landing site: 69 kilometres (43 mi) NW of Arkalyk

Orbital parameters
- Reference system: Geocentric
- Regime: Low Earth
- Perigee altitude: 198 kilometres (123 mi)
- Apogee altitude: 219 kilometres (136 mi)
- Inclination: 51.6 degrees
- Period: 88.7 minutes

Docking with Mir
- Docking date: 3 August 1990, 11:45:44 UTC
- Undocking date: 10 December 1990, 02:48:11 UTC
- Soyuz programme (Crewed missions)

Soyuz TM-10 was the tenth expedition to the Russian Space Station Mir.

== Crew ==
Position	Launching crew	Landing crew
Commander	Gennady Manakov; First spaceflight	
Flight engineer	Gennady Strekalov; Fourth spaceflight	
Research cosmonaut	None	Toyohiro Akiyama, TBS (reporter); Only spaceflight

== Mission highlights ==
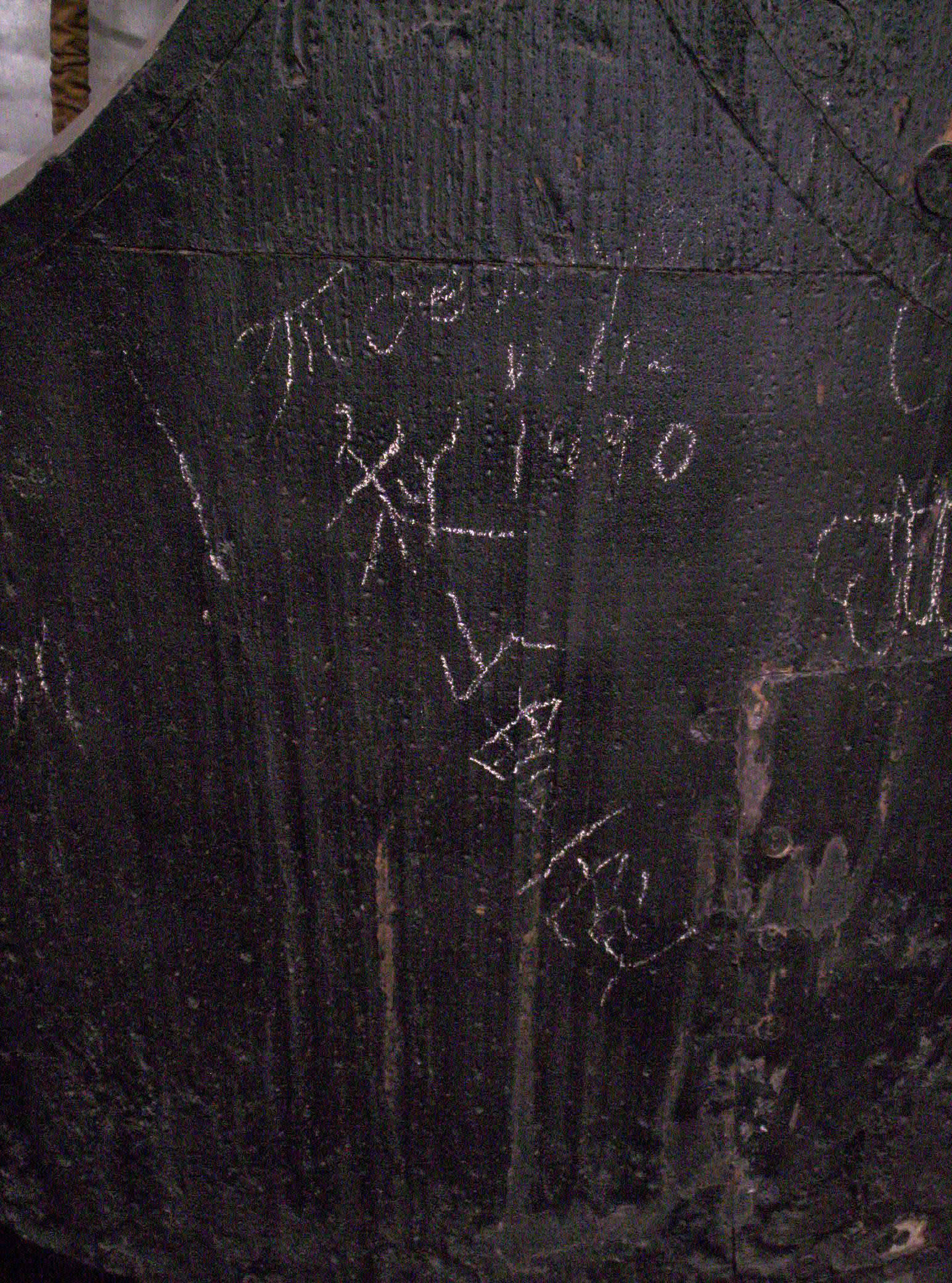
Side of the Soyuz TM-10 where it was signed by all its passengers. The inscription in Japanese reads Toyohiro Akiyama (秋山豊寛).

TM-10 marked the return to Earth of Japanese reporter Toyohiro Akiyama.

The Soyuz arrived at Mir's aft port with four passengers: quail for cages in Kvant-2. A quail had laid an egg en route to the station. It was returned to Earth, along with 130 kg of experiment results and industrial products, in Soyuz TM-9. The spacecraft landed without incident.

It spent 131 days attached to Mir. A camera was installed in the descent module as part of the agreement with Akiyama's network to film the reactions of the returning cosmonauts.
