= Leonid Kizim =

Soviet cosmonaut (1941–2010)

- Леонид Кизим; Леонід Кизим
- Kizim in 1984
- Born: August 5, 1941; Krasnyi Lyman, Donetsk Oblast, Soviet Union (now Lyman, Ukraine)
- Died: June 14, 2010 (aged 68); Moscow, Russia
- Occupation: Pilot
- Awards: Hero of the Soviet Union
- Space career

Cosmonaut
- Rank: Colonel General, Soviet Air Force
- Time in space: 374d 17h 56m
- Selection: Air Force Group 3
- Total EVAs: 8
- Total EVA time: 31h, 40m
- Missions: Soyuz T-3 (Salyut 6 EO-5), Soyuz T-10/Soyuz T-11 (Salyut 7 EO-3), Soyuz T-15 (Mir EO-1/Salyut 7 EO-5)

Leonid Denisovich Kizim (Russian: Леонид Денисович Кизим; 5 August 1941 – 14 June 2010) was a Soviet cosmonaut.

== Biography ==
Kizim was born in Krasnyi Lyman, Donetsk Oblast, Soviet Union (now Lyman, Ukraine). He graduated from Higher Air Force School in 1975; and served as a test pilot in the Soviet Air Force. He was selected as a cosmonaut on October 23, 1965. Kizim flew as Commander on Soyuz T-3, Soyuz T-10 and Soyuz T-15, and also served as backup commander for Soyuz T-2. On Soyuz T-15, he was part of the only crew to visit two space stations on one spaceflight (Mir and Salyut 7).

All together he spent 374 days 17 hours 56 minutes in space. Of all the Soviet cosmonauts (and of all the 199 cosmonauts from all countries who participated in space flights during the first 25 years of crewed cosmonautics), he spent the greatest amount of time in space.

He later served as Deputy Director Satellite Control-Center of the Russian Ministry of Defense; after May 1995 he was Director of the Military Engineering Academy of Aeronautics and Astronautics in St. Petersburg.

He left the cosmonaut program on June 13, 1987, but remained in the Soviet Air Force, and later the Russian Air Force. In 1993, he was placed in charge of the A.F. Mozhaysky Military-Space Academy. He held that position until he retired from the Russian Air Force on September 10, 2001, at the rank of Colonel General.

Kizim died on June 14, 2010. He left a wife and two children.

== Awards ==
He was awarded:

- Twice Hero of the Soviet Union (December 10, 1980 and October 2, 1984);
- Pilot-Cosmonaut of the USSR
- Order of Honour
- Order of Friendship
- Three Orders of Lenin
- Medal "For the Development of Virgin Lands"

Foreign awards:

- Order of Sukhbaatar (Mongolia)
- Medal "30 Years of Victory over Japan's Militarists" (Mongolia)
- Medal "60 Years of the Mongolian People's Revolution"
- Knight of the Legion of Honour (France)
- Kirti Chakra (India)
- Order of Merit (Ukraine)

== Literature ==
- Military Encyclopedic Dictionary of the Strategic Missile Forces / Ministry of Defense of the Russian Federation; Ed.-in-Chief Igor Sergeyev, Vladimir Yakovlev, Nikolai Solovtsov. — M.: Great Russian Encyclopedia, 1999. — 632 p. — 8500 copies. — ISBN 5-85270-315-X. — p. 228.
