= Vladimir Solovyov (cosmonaut) =

Soviet cosmonaut (born 1946)

- Владимир Соловьёв
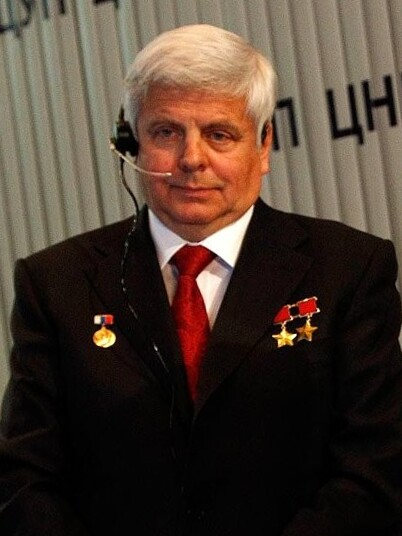
- Solovyov in 2011
- Born: 11 November 1946 (age 79); Moscow, Russian SFSR, USSR
- Occupation: Flight engineer
- Awards: Hero of the Soviet Union (2)
- Space career

Cosmonaut
- Status: Retired
- Time in space: 361d 22h 49m
- Selection: 1978
- Total EVAs: 8
- Total EVA time: 31h, 40m
- Missions: Soyuz T-10/Soyuz T-11 (Salyut 7 EO-3), Soyuz T-15 (Mir EO-1/Salyut 7 EO-5)

Vladimir Alekseyevich Solovyov (Russian: Влади́мир Алексе́евич Соловьёв; born 11 November 1946) is a former Soviet and Russian cosmonaut.

He was selected as a cosmonaut on 1 December 1978 and flew as Flight Engineer on Soyuz T-10 and Soyuz T-15, spending a total of 361 days, 22 hours, 49 minutes in space. His first flight, Soyuz T-10, took off on 8 February 1984, to join Salyut 7. The crew spent ten months (nearly 237 days) performing numerous medical and space manufacturing experiments. They came down aboard Soyuz T-11 on 2 October 1984. Solovyov's second flight was aboard Soyuz T-15, taking off on 13 March 1986 and coming back aboard the same craft on 16 July 1986, 125 days later. During the T-15 mission, the crew transferred equipment from Salyut-7 to the new Mir space station; they were the last aboard the former and the first aboard the latter.

Solovyov then became the Mir flight director (Russian Mission Control) for several years. He retired on 18 February 1994 but came back to head the Russian segment of the International Space Station (ISS).

Solovyov is married and has two children.

He was awarded:

- Twice Hero of the Soviet Union (2 October 1984 and 16 July 1986);
- Pilot-Cosmonaut of the USSR;
- Order of Honour (Russian Federation);
- Order of Friendship (Russian Federation);
- Two Orders of Lenin (USSR);
- Medal "For Merit in Space Exploration" (Russian Federation);
- Knight of the Legion of Honour (France);
- Kirti Chakra (India).
