= Yuri Malyshev (cosmonaut) =

Soviet cosmonaut (1941–1999)

- Юрий Малышев
- Malyshev in c. 1980
- Born: 27 August 1941; Nikolayevsk, Volgograd Oblast, USSR
- Died: 8 November 1999 (aged 58); Zvyozdny Gorodok, Moscow Oblast, Russian Federation
- Occupation: Pilot
- Awards: Hero of the Soviet Union (twice)
- Space career

Cosmonaut
- Rank: Colonel, Soviet Air Force
- Time in space: 11d 19h 59m
- Selection: Air Force Group 4
- Missions: Soyuz T-2, Soyuz T-11/Soyuz T-10

Yuri Vasilyevich Malyshev (Russian: Ю́рий Васи́льевич Ма́лышев; 27 August 1941 – 8 November 1999) was a Soviet cosmonaut who served on the Soyuz T-2 (5–9 June 1980) and Soyuz T-11 (3–11 April 1984) missions.

== Awards and honors ==
- Twice Hero of the Soviet Union (16 June 1980 and 11 April 1984)
- Pilot-Cosmonaut of the USSR (16 June 1980)
- Two Orders of Lenin (16 June 1980 and 11 April 1984)
- Ashoka Chakra (India, 1984)

== Publications ==
- Co-author of the book USSR-India. At Space Orbit
