= Vladimir Vasyutin =

Soviet cosmonaut (1952–2002)

- Владимир Васютин; Володимир Васютін
- Born: 8 March 1952; Kharkiv, Ukrainian SSR, Soviet Union
- Died: 19 July 2002 (aged 50); Moscow, Russia
- Occupation: Pilot
- Space career

Cosmonaut
- Rank: Lieutenant General, Russian Air Force
- Time in space: 64d 21h 52m
- Selection: Civilian Specialist Group 3
- Missions: Salyut 7 EO-4 (Soyuz T-14)

Vladimir Vladimirovich Vasyutin (Russian: Влaдимиp Bлaдимиpoвич Васютин; 8 March 1952 – 19 July 2002) was a Soviet cosmonaut.

He was selected as a cosmonaut on 1 December 1978 (TsPK-6). He retired on 25 February 1986.

Vasyutin was assigned to the TKS program for a new generation of crewed military spacecraft that would be docked to the existing Salyut space stations.

He flew as the Commander on Soyuz T-14 to the Salyut 7 space station for part of the long-duration mission Salyut 7 EO-4. He spent 64 days, 21 hours and 52 minutes in space. The TKS module was already docked to the Salyut, and Vasyutin was due to lead an extended program of military space experiments; however, he fell ill shortly after arriving at the station and was unable to perform his duties. Although he was originally scheduled to have a six-month stay aboard Salyut 7, his illness (which he had concealed from doctors before the launch) forced the crew to make an emergency return to Earth after only two months. His illness is said to have been caused by a prostate infection, which had manifested itself as inflammation and a fever.

Vasyutin graduated from Higher Air Force School and from Test Pilot School, both in Kharkov. He was a Lieutenant General in the Soviet Air Forces and took cosmonaut basic training in August 1976. He retired for medical reasons. He later became Deputy Faculty Chief, VVA – Gagarin Air Force Academy, Monino.

He was married and had two children. He died of cancer.

== Awards and honors ==
- Hero of the Soviet Union
- Pilot-Cosmonaut of the USSR
- Order of Honour (Russian Federation)
- Order of Lenin
- Medal "For Strengthening Military Cooperation" (USSR)
- Medal "For Strengthening Military Cooperation" (Russian Federation Defence Ministry)
- Medal "Brotherhood in Arms" (Polish People's Republic)
