= Timeline of longest spaceflights =

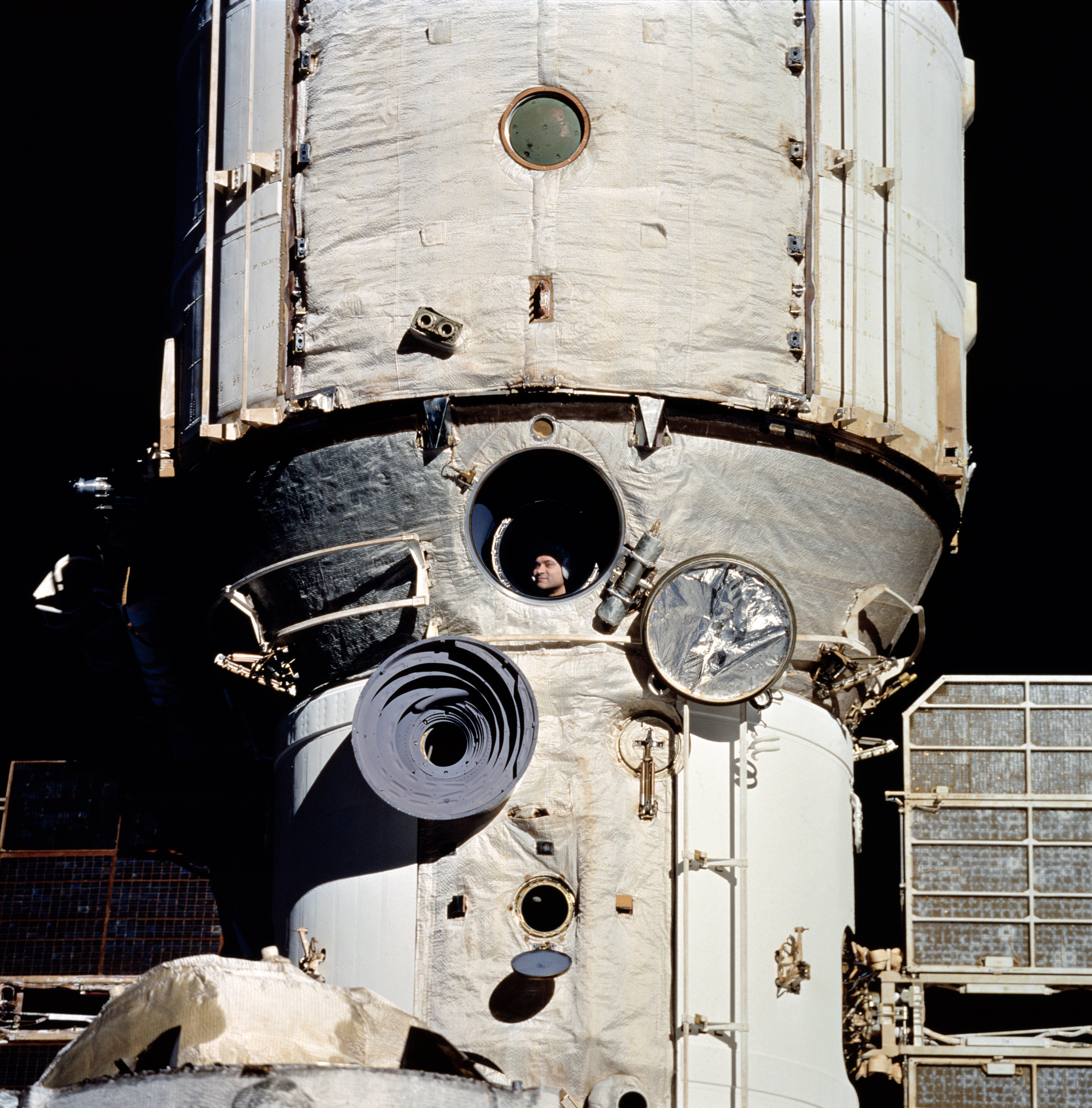
Cosmonaut Valeri Polyakov looks out space station Mir's window during his 438-day flight in 1994–1995

Many of the first human spaceflights set records measured in hours and days, the space station missions of the 1970s and 1980s pushed this to weeks and months, and by the 1990s the record was pushed to over a year and has remained there into the 21st century.

A modern long-duration mission was the ISS year-long mission (2015–2016) aboard the International Space Station. The most significant issue in such missions is the effect of spaceflight on the human body, due to such factors as zero-g and elevated radiation.

== Record setting single-mission human stays ==
| Duration (days) | Cosmonaut / Astronauts | Mission | Mission start | Flight up | Space station | Flight down | Record achieved | Mission end | Record held (days) | Source / Notes |
|---|---|---|---|---|---|---|---|---|---|---|
| 437.75 | Valeri Polyakov | Mir EO-15 | January 8, 1994 | Soyuz TM-18 | Mir | Soyuz TM-20 | January 9, 1995 | March 22, 1995 | 11,162 | Current record |
| 365.94 | Vladimir Titov; Musa Manarov | Mir EO-3 | December 21, 1987 | Soyuz TM-4 | Mir | Soyuz TM-6 | November 11, 1988 | December 21, 1988 | 2,250 | |
| 326.48 | Yuri Romanenko | Mir EO-2 | February 5, 1987 | Soyuz TM-2 | Mir | Soyuz TM-3 | September 30, 1987 | December 29, 1987 | 408 | |
| 236.95 | Leonid Kizim; Vladimir Solovyov; Oleg Atkov | Salyut 7 EO-3 | February 8, 1984 | Soyuz T-10 | Salyut 7 | Soyuz T-11 | September 6, 1984 | October 2, 1984 | 1,119 | |
| 211.38 | Anatoly Berezovoy; Valentin Lebedev | Salyut 7 EO-1 | May 13, 1982 | Soyuz T-5 | Salyut 7 | Soyuz T-7 | November 14, 1982 | December 10, 1982 | 662 | |
| 184.84 | Leonid Popov; Valery Ryumin | Salyut 6 EO-4 | April 9, 1980 | Soyuz 35 | Salyut 6 | Soyuz 37 | October 1, 1980 | October 11, 1980 | 774 | |
| 175.02 | Vladimir Lyakhov; Valery Ryumin | Salyut 6 EO-3 | February 25, 1979 | Soyuz 32 | Salyut 6 | Soyuz 34 | July 15, 1979 | September 3, 1979 | 444 | |
| 139.62 | Vladimir Kovalyonok; Aleksandr Ivanchenkov | Salyut 6 EO-2 | June 15, 1978 | Soyuz 29 | Salyut 6 | Soyuz 31 | September 20, 1978 | November 2, 1978 | 298 | |
| 96.42 | Yuri Romanenko; Georgi Grechko | Salyut 6 EO-1 | December 10, 1977 | Soyuz 26 | Salyut 6 | Soyuz 27 | March 4, 1978 | March 16, 1978 | 200 | |
| 84.05 | Gerald P. Carr; Edward G. Gibson; William R. Pogue | Skylab 4 | November 16, 1973 | CSM-118 | Skylab | CSM-118 | January 15, 1974 | February 8, 1974 | 1,509 | |
| 59.46 | Alan L. Bean; Owen K. Garriott; Jack R. Lousma | Skylab 3 | July 28, 1973 | CSM-117 | Skylab | CSM-117 | August 25, 1973 | September 25, 1973 | 143 | |
| 28.03 | Charles "Pete" Conrad, Jr. Joseph P. Kerwin; Paul J. Weitz | Skylab 2 | May 25, 1973 | CSM-116 | Skylab | CSM-116 | June 17, 1973 | June 22, 1973 | 69 | |
| 23.32 | Georgy Dobrovolsky; Vladislav Volkov; Viktor Patsayev | Soyuz 11 | June 6, 1971 | Soyuz 11 | Salyut 1 | Soyuz 11 | June 23, 1971 | June 29, 1971 | 725 | All died returning to Earth. |
| 17.71 | Andriyan Nikolayev; Vitaly Sevastyanov | Soyuz 9 | June 1, 1970 | N/A | N/A | N/A | June 15, 1970 | June 19, 1970 | 373 | Still record for flight by a solo spacecraft. |
| 13.77 | Frank Borman; Jim Lovell | Gemini 7 | December 4, 1965 | N/A | N/A | N/A | December 12, 1965 | December 18, 1965 | 1,646 | |
| 7.96 | L. Gordon Cooper, Jr. Charles "Pete" Conrad, Jr. | Gemini 5 | August 21, 1965 | N/A | N/A | N/A | August 26, 1965 | August 29, 1965 | 108 | |
| 4.96 | Valery Bykovsky | Vostok 5 | June 14, 1963 | N/A | N/A | N/A | June 18, 1963 | June 19, 1963 | 800 | |
| 3.93 | Andriyan Nikolayev | Vostok 3 | August 11, 1962 | N/A | N/A | N/A | August 12, 1962 | August 15, 1962 | 310 | |
| 1.05 | Gherman Titov | Vostok 2 | August 6, 1961 | N/A | N/A | N/A | August 6, 1961 | August 7, 1961 | 371 | |
| 0.075 | Yuri Gagarin | Vostok 1 | April 12, 1961 | N/A | N/A | N/A | April 12, 1961 | April 12, 1961 | 116 | 1st human spaceflight |

== See also ==
- List of spaceflight records
- Manned Venus flyby
- Skylab 4
