= Salyut 6 EO-1 =

Soviet long duration space expedition to Salyut 6

- Mission type: Salyut expedition
- Mission duration: 96 days

Expedition
- Space station: Salyut 6
- Began: 10 December 1977
- Ended: 16 March 1978
- Arrived aboard: Soyuz 26
- Departed aboard: Soyuz 27

Crew
- Crew size: 2
- Members: Yuri Romanenko; Georgi Grechko
- Callsign: Таймыр Taymyr, Taymyr Peninsula

Salyut 6 EO-1 was a Soviet long duration space expedition, the first to dock successfully with the space station Salyut 6. The two person crew stayed were in space for a record setting 96 days, from December 1977 to March 1978. The expedition was the start of what would be the semi-permanent occupation of space by the Soviets.

The expedition set several records and established several milestones, including the longest space flight to that time, the first docking of three spacecraft together, and the hosting of the first non-Soviet, non-American space-farer. Additionally, the mission saw the first spacewalk by the Soviets since 1969. An important modification from previous Salyut stations which made many of these feats possible was an extra docking port on Salyut 6, which allowed for re-supply missions, visiting crews and, potentially, crew rotations and permanent occupation.

The crew consisted of Yuri Romanenko and Georgy Grechko. Their call sign for the mission was Taymyr, after the Russian peninsula. The crew were launched aboard Soyuz 26, and are often referred to as the Soyuz 26 crew, even though they returned to earth aboard Soyuz 27, a few months after the Soyuz 26 spacecraft had been landed.

== Crew ==
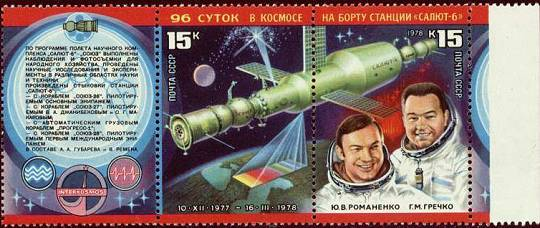
The crew and the station with a docked Soyuz.

This was the first spaceflight of the mission's commander, Yuri Romanenko, and the second spaceflight of the flight engineer Georgy Grechko, who flew on the 29-day Soyuz 17 mission to Salyut 4. Soyuz 17, at the time, held the record for Soviet mission duration, and EO-1 would also break the mission duration record (surpassing USA's Skylab 4 mission, which lasted 84 days).

Position	Name	Spaceflight	Launch	Landing	Duration	Notes
Commander	(Soviet Union) Yuri Romanenko	First	10 December 1977; Soyuz 26	16 March 1978; Soyuz 27	96 days	Record spaceflight duration
Flight Engineer	(Soviet Union) Georgy Grechko	Second	10 December 1977; Soyuz 26	16 March 1978; Soyuz 27	96 days	Record spaceflight duration

The backup crew for EO-1 was Vladimir Kovalyonok, who would have been Commander, and Aleksandr Ivanchenkov who would have been flight engineer. Kovalyonok and Ivanchenkov also served as the backup crew for the EP-1 mission in January 1978 to Salyut 6.

== Mission highlights ==
=== Launch of Soyuz 26 ===
Drawing of the Soyuz 7K-T type of spacecraft. Soyuz 26, which brought the EO-1 crew members to the space station, was of this design.

In the wake of Soyuz 25's failure to dock with the orbiting Salyut 6 space station, Soyuz 26 was launched with the aim of docking at the other port, the aft port. The two-man crew of Romanenko and Grechko was launched 10 December 1977, the first launch window following the failed mission. Grechko's presence on the flight arose out of the Soyuz 25 failure. A decision to no longer fly all-rookie crews made him the replacement engineer for Soyuz 26. The launch was almost delayed by bad weather in the Atlantic Ocean where the tracking ship Cosmonaut Yuri Gagarin was stationed. Once the ship's antennae were locked into position, the Soyuz launch was set to launch as the ship was needed to relay the docking procedure to mission control. The crew docked the next day, checked the seals and opened the hatches to the station, the first crew to enter the station. It was only upon the announcement of this successful docking that the Soviets revealed the station had a second port. The Soyuz 26 spacecraft remained docked until January 1978, when it landed the crew of EP-1.

By 13 December 1977, the station had been activated, and the cosmonauts gave a television tour of the station the next day.

=== First Soviet spacewalk since 1969 ===
On 20 December 1977, the crew performed the only spacewalk of the EO-1 mission. The purpose was to inspect the forward docking port to assess whether there was damage which might have prevented Soyuz 25 from docking two months earlier. The spacewalk was the first one by the Soviets since cosmonauts from Soyuz 5 transferred to Soyuz 4 in 1969. The spacewalk was also significant as it was the first use of the Orlan space suits (which are still used today on the International Space Station).

The issue of whether the front docking port was broken, and if so was salvageable, was crucial to mission planners. If there was only a single usable port, only short-duration missions were possible at the station. The Soyuz 25 docking apparatus burned up during re-entry in October, so it could not be determined whether the fault lay there.

Grechko left the Salyut while Romanenko remained in the depressurized airlock. He reported that there was no visible damage to the docking drogue, which meant that the docking mechanism on Soyuz 25 was faulty, not that of Salyut 6. Accordingly, the station's program was rescued. Additionally, he placed a materials exposure experiment on the exterior of the space station to be retrieved by a subsequent crew. The EVA lasted 1 hour and 28 minutes.

It was later revealed that a potentially dangerous incident occurred during the EVA. Once Grechko was back in the airlock, Romanenko asked to look outside, so Grechko moved aside and Romanenko pushed hard against the airlock. He did not have his safety tether attached and began to float away from the station and thrash about. Grechko grabbed his commander by his untethered safety line and pulled him back in. (In an interview afterward, he reported he asked Romanenko, "Yuri, where are you going?") Grechko felt the incident was overblown by author James Oberg to sound more dangerous than it really was. Although Romanenko's safety tether was not attached, there was still the electricity/communications umbilical that would have held him to the station. Another complication occurred when the gauges indicated no air was refilling the airlock. However, it was soon realized the gauges had to be faulty, and they safely reentered the station.

Numerous experiments were carried out over the next few weeks. Since this was an attempt to set a new space-endurance record, much of the focus of the mission was on medical experimentation. But other research was also done. Earth observations were made 21 December 1977 of the Soviet Union and of forest fires in Africa, and a new navigation system was tested on 25 December 1977. By 3 January 1978, the crew requested more work as they were nearly finished setting up the station.

=== The first triple docking ===
The station required refueling by mid-January 1978, and this was to be accomplished by a new unmanned supply tanker, Progress. But the tanker had to dock at the aft port where the propellant line connections were, and Soyuz 26 was docked there. Mission control was not yet willing to attempt to redock the Soyuz at the other port, a now-standard practice. Accordingly, a new crew was sent up on another Soyuz 7K-T spacecraft to dock at the forward port, and depart in the parked Soyuz 26 spacecraft.

The mission, called EP-1, was launched on 10 January 1978 with Vladimir Dzhanibekov and Oleg Makarov. The spacecraft used to launch EP-1 was called Soyuz 27, which successfully docked at Salyut 6's forward port the next day, much to the relief of mission control. This was the first time three independently launched spacecraft had ever flown docked to each other. While the docking took place, Grechko and Romanenko moved into Soyuz 26 and closed the hatches in case of an accident.

The visiting crew brought supplies such as food, books and letters, equipment and a French biological experiment, and Dzhanibekov, an electronics expert, inspected the station's electrical system.

On 13 January 1978, the crews performed for the first time the now-routine exchange of seat liners and centering weights in their respective Soyuz craft. The liners are custom molded for each space traveler, and are needed for launch and landing, and the weights are needed to ensure a proper center of mass for the returning craft so it does not undershoot or overshoot the landing target. While the main reason for the Soyuz swap was to free the aft port for the Progress, another reason was that extended exposure to space of the vehicle leads to degradation of its engine and propellant seals.

A now-standard experiment called "Resonance" was carried out, which tested the stresses of the multi-spacecraft structure by simply having the cosmonauts jump up and down. The visiting crew undocked Soyuz 26 on 16 January 1978 and returned to Earth, thus freeing the aft port for the next spacecraft.

=== Progress 1 ===
A drawing of the Progress 7K-TG spacecraft, the first of which, Progress 1, resupplied the EO-1 crew.

Four days later, on 20 January 1978, an unmanned cargo ship called Progress 1 was launched. The non-reusable Progress spacecraft were designed to refuel the space station and bring supplies for the crew; Progress 1 was the first of its kind to be launched. The tanker docked at the aft port on 22 January 1978. Some 1000 kg of propellants were on board and 1300 kg of supplies, including replacement parts, clothes, air and food. On 29 January 1978, Progress replenished the air of the station. On 2 and 3 February 1978, the refueling operation was completed. The refueling was another first. Never before had one spacecraft refuelled another in orbit. Finally, the craft was used to make orbit adjustments and was undocked and de-orbited on 8 February, burning up during re-entry over the Pacific Ocean.

On 11 February 1978, the crew received congratulations from Pyotr Klimuk and Vitaly Sevastyanov - the crew of Soyuz 18 - for surpassing their Soviet space-endurance record of 63 days.

The crew took photographs with the MKF-6M multi-spectral camera, and created alloys with the Splav furnace. To attempt to make pure alloys, the attitude adjusters of the station were turned off, but Grechko reported samples were degraded by slight movements of the station despite the precautions. One discovery made as a result of these experiments was that the station naturally aligned itself with its service compartment pointing towards the Earth and its transfer compartment away. This meant attitude control propellant could be preserved. A telescope was used extensively for observations of Earth and the Orion Nebula towards the end of February 1978, but the Soviets reported three crew were required for the optimum results.

=== Second visiting crew, first international cosmonaut, new space record ===
On 2 March 1978, Soyuz 28 was launched, carrying Soviet cosmonaut Aleksei Gubarev and Czechoslovak cosmonaut Vladimír Remek. Remek was the first non-Soviet, non-American person in space and flew as part of the Soviet Interkosmos program which flew military pilots from Soviet bloc countries, and other countries later. The Soyuz 28 crew docked with the station at the vacant aft port on 3 March 1978, and spent the next week performing experiments.

It was during the visit by this crew that the EO-1 crew surpassed the Skylab 4 record of 84 days in space, which had stood since 1974.

The Soyuz 28 crew left in the craft they arrived in and returned to Earth 10 March 1978. No exchange of craft was contemplated as the EO-1 crew were due to return soon themselves.

During the visit, one of the Soyuz 28 crew informed Romanenko that Grechko's father had died. It was left to his judgment whether he should inform him during the mission or after they landed. He decided to wait for the completion of the mission.

=== The mission ends ===
On 9 March 1978, the crew's exercise routine was increased from 1–3 hours a day to 10–12 hours a day in preparation for their return to Earth. Deactivation of the station commenced on 13 March 1978, and the Soyuz 27 engines were tested on 15 March 1978.

By the end of the mission, Romanenko had developed an excruciating toothache, but there was little to stop the pain with on the station. All doctors at mission control could suggest was that he wash his mouth with warm water and keep warm. By the end of the mission — only six days after the Soyuz 28 crew's landing — a nerve had been exposed.

They undocked from the station in Soyuz 27 on 16 March 1978 and landed 265 km west of Nur-Sultan (Astana). They had set a new space endurance record of 96 days.

They underwent immediate medical tests. It was announced that Grechko's heart had changed position during the flight and each had lost 4 kg on average during the mission. Leg volume decreased significant, though it was said the crew did not faithfully carry out the exercise regime while aboard the station. Both men tried to swim out of bed when they awoke for the first few days, and by the fourth day could walk through a park. It took two weeks for them to fully recover.

== See also ==
- List of human spaceflights to Salyut space stations
- Timeline of longest spaceflights
