= Salyut 6 EP-1 =

- Mission type: Salyut visiting crew
- Mission duration: 5.96 days (launch to landing)

Expedition
- Space station: Salyut 6
- Began: 10 January 1978
- Ended: 16 January 1978
- Arrived aboard: Soyuz 27
- Departed aboard: Soyuz 26

Crew
- Crew size: 2
- Members: Vladimir Dzhanibekov; Oleg Makarov
- Callsign: Памир Pamir; Pamir Mountains

Soyuz 6 EP-1 was a 1978 Soviet crewed space flight to the orbiting Salyut 6 space station, during the expedition EO-1. It was the third crewed flight to the station, and the second successful docking. It was also the first crew to visit an occupied station and marked the first time that three spacecraft were docked together. The launching spacecraft was Soyuz 27 (Russian: Союз 27, Union 27), and the crew of EP-1 are often referred to as the Soyuz 27 crew.

The main function of the mission was to swap Soyuz craft with the orbiting crew, in so doing freeing a docking port for a forthcoming supply tanker. Cosmonauts Vladimir Dzhanibekov and Oleg Makarov returned to Earth in the Soyuz 26 spacecraft after spending five days on the station.

== Crew ==
Position	Cosmonaut
Commander	Vladimir Dzhanibekov; 1st spaceflight
Flight Engineer	Oleg Makarov; 3rd spaceflight

=== Backup crew ===
Position	Cosmonaut
Commander	Vladimir Kovalyonok
Flight Engineer	Aleksandr Ivanchenkov

== Mission highlights ==
The Soyuz 27 crew comprised the original prime and back-up commanders for the scheduled East German Interkosmos mission. Dzhanibekov and Makarov were reassigned as a result of the Soyuz 25 dock failure and the new rule that no all-rookie crew was allowed to fly. Soyuz 27 was launched with its two-man crew on 10 January 1978. Its primary goal was to swap ships with the resident Soyuz 26 crew and thereby free up the aft port of the Salyut 6 space station for the upcoming Progress 1 resupply mission (Mission control was not yet willing to attempt to redock Soyuz 26 to the other port, a now-standard practice). Its immediate goal was to ensure the station's forward port was a functional dock. Soyuz 25 had failed to dock with the forward port the previous October, and a December spacewalk and inspection by the Soyuz 26 crew had seemed to indicate that the docking problem was a fault of the Soyuz 25 craft rather than the Salyut's dock. The Soyuz 25's dock mechanism was burned up and destroyed during reentry and could not be inspected.

Dzhanibekov noticed that as he and Makarov approached the station in Soyuz 27, they were slightly off-course, but he allowed the automatic system to continue and, with 7 metres (23 ft) to go, it corrected the slight alignment error. To the relief of mission control, Soyuz 27 successfully docked at the forward port. While the docking took place, Grechko and Romanenko moved into Soyuz 26 and closed the hatches in case of an accident. It was the first-ever docking of three independently launched spacecraft.

The Soyuz 27 crew then encountered their first problem - a balky hatch that opened suddenly and sent Makarov and Dzhanibekov tumbling backwards. The Salyut crew dove into the Soyuz and hugged their first visitors. They talked to Mission Control where Soviet premier Leonid Brezhnev was watching the proceedings through a live video feed from space.

Russian hospitality by the Soyuz 26 crew was on display through the common symbols of fellowship and good luck, offerings of bread and salt, were replaced by biscuits and salt tablets. The crews also made many toasts with vodka and cherry juice in squeeze tubes.

The visiting crew brought supplies such as food, books and letters, equipment and a French biological experiment called "Cytos," and Dzhanibekov, an electronics expert, inspected the station's electrical system.

To test the structural integrity of a station which consisted of three spacecraft, the four men held onto their exercise treadmill and bounced up and down to see if this amplified any vibrations. It had been found that resonant frequencies could be created by running at certain speeds. The crew found that the station was perfectly safe with two spacecraft docked.

One piece of information that the visiting crew didn't immediately tell the station crew was that Grechko's father had died ten days earlier. Psychologists had decided such knowledge was not in the best interests of a cosmonaut spending several months in space. Makarov and Dzhanibekov informed commander Romanenko, however, who assumed the responsibility of telling Grechko when they landed. Years later, Grechko said in an interview that he also thought the decision was the right one.

The only major scientific experiment performed by the crews of Soyuz 26 and 27 was the French Cytos experiment, an investigation into how microgravity might affect the way protozoa grew. The experiment showed very little difference between those in space and the control group on Earth. The only slight difference was in the cells' metabolism.

On 13 January the crews performed for the first time the now-routine exchange of seat liners and centering weights in their respective Soyuz craft. The liners are custom molded for each space traveler, and are needed for launch and landing, and the weights are needed to ensure a proper center of mass for the returning craft so it does not undershoot or overshoot the landing target.

Makarov and Dzhanibekov departed the Salyut station in Soyuz 26 on 16 January and landed 310 kilometres (190 mi) west of Tselinograd, Kazakhstan in the Soyuz 26 craft. The original Soyuz 26 crew used the Soyuz 27 craft to end their record-breaking 96-day mission on 16 March 1978.
