= Grechko =

Grechko is a surname. Notable people with the surname include:

- Andrei Grechko (1903–1976), Soviet general, Marshal of the Soviet Union, Minister of Defense
- Georgy Grechko (1931–2017), Soviet cosmonaut
- Stepan Grechko (1910–1977), Soviet military commander, Colonel General of aviation

== See also ==
- Grechka
- 3148 Grechko, minor planet
