= Progress 1 =

Soviet cargo spacecraft

- Mission type: Salyut 6 resupply
- Operator: OKB-1
- COSPAR ID: 1978-008A
- SATCAT no.: 10603
- Mission duration: 18 days, 18 hours and 20 minutes

Spacecraft properties
- Spacecraft: Progress s/n 102
- Spacecraft type: Progress 7K-TG
- Manufacturer: NPO Energia
- Launch mass: 7020 kg
- Dry mass: 6520 kg
- Payload mass: 2300 kg
- Dimensions: 7.48 m in length and 2.72 m in diameter

Start of mission
- Launch date: 20 January 1978, 08:24:40 UTC
- Rocket: Soyuz-U s/n E15000-075
- Launch site: Baikonur, Site 31/6
- Contractor: OKB-1

End of mission
- Disposal: Deorbited
- Decay date: 8 February 1978, 02:45 UTC

Orbital parameters
- Reference system: Geocentric orbit
- Regime: Low Earth orbit
- Perigee altitude: 329 km
- Apogee altitude: 348 km
- Inclination: 51.66°
- Period: 91.3 minutes
- Epoch: 20 January 2020

Docking with Salyut 6
- Docking port: Aft
- Docking date: 22 January 1978, 10:12:14 UTC
- Undocking date: 6 February 1978, 05:54 UTC
- Time docked: 14 days, 19 hours and 42 minutes

Cargo
- Mass: 2300 kg
- Pressurised: 1300 kg
- Fuel: 1000 kg

Progress 1 (Russian: Прогресс 1), was a Soviet unmanned Progress cargo spacecraft which was launched in 1978 to resupply the Salyut 6 space station. It was the maiden flight of the Progress spacecraft, and used the Progress 7K-TG configuration. It carried supplies for the EO-1 crew aboard Salyut 6, which consisted of Soviet cosmonauts Yuri Romanenko and Georgy Grechko. The cargo carried by Progress 1 also included equipment for conducting scientific research, and fuel for adjusting the station's orbit and performing manoeuvres.

== Spacecraft ==
Progress 1 was a Progress 7K-TG spacecraft. The first of forty three to be launched, it had the serial number 102. The Progress 7K-TG spacecraft was the first generation Progress, derived from the Soyuz 7K-T and intended for unmanned logistics missions to space stations in support of the Salyut programme. The spacecraft were also used on some missions to adjust the orbit of the space station.

The Progress spacecraft had a dry mass of 6,520 kilograms (14,370 lb), which increased to around 7,020 kilograms (15,480 lb) when fully fuelled. It measured 7.48 metres (24.5 ft) in length, and 2.72 metres (8 ft 11 in) in diameter. Each spacecraft could accommodate up to 2,500 kilograms (5,500 lb) of payload, consisting of dry cargo and propellant. The spacecraft were powered by chemical batteries, and could operate in free flight for up to three days, remaining docked to the station for up to thirty.

== Launch and docking ==
Progress 1 was launched at 08:24:40 UTC on 20 January 1978, atop a Soyuz-U 11A511U carrier rocket flying from Site 31/6 at the Baikonur Cosmodrome, USSR. The rocket that launched it had the serial number E15000-075. Following launch, Progress 1 was given the COSPAR designation 1978-008A, whilst NORAD assigned it the Satellite Catalog Number 10603.

Following launch, Progress 1 began two days of free flight. It subsequently docked with the aft port of the Salyut 6 space station at 10:12:14 UTC on 22 January 1978. When the Progress spacecraft docked, the station's other docking port was occupied by the Soyuz 27 spacecraft.

== Mission ==
Progress 1 was the first of twelve Progress spacecraft used to supply the Salyut 6 space station between 1978 and 1981. Its payload of 2,300 kilograms (5,100 lb) consisted of 1,000 kilograms (2,200 lb) of propellant and oxygen, as well as 1,300 kilograms (2,900 lb) of food, replacement parts, scientific instruments, and other supplies. Whilst Progress 1 was docked, the EO-1 crew, consisting of cosmonauts Yuri Romanenko and Georgi Grechko, was aboard the station. Progress 1 demonstrated the capability to refuel a spacecraft on orbit, critical for long-term station operations. Once the cosmonauts had unloaded the cargo delivered by Progress 1, they loaded refuse onto the freighter for disposal.

On 6 February 1978, Progress 1 was catalogued in a low Earth orbit with a perigee of 329 kilometres (204 mi) and an apogee of 348 kilometres (216 mi), inclined at 51.66° and with a period of 91.3 minutes. Progress 1 undocked from Salyut 6 at 05:54 UTC on 6 February. It remained in orbit for two more days, finally being deorbited to a destructive reentry over the Pacific Ocean at around 02:45 UTC on 8 February 1978.

== See also ==
- 1978 in spaceflight
- List of Progress missions
- List of uncrewed spaceflights to Salyut space stations
