= Soyuz 25 =

Crewed flight of the Soyuz programme

- COSPAR ID: 1977-099A
- SATCAT no.: 10401
- Mission duration: 2 days, 44 minutes, 45 seconds
- Orbits completed: 32

Spacecraft properties
- Spacecraft type: Soyuz 7K-T
- Manufacturer: NPO Energia
- Launch mass: 6,860 kilograms (15,120 lb)

Crew
- Crew size: 2
- Members: Vladimir Kovalyonok; Valery Ryumin
- Callsign: Фотон (Foton - "Photon"

Start of mission
- Launch date: October 9, 1977, 02:40:35 UTC
- Rocket: Soyuz-U
- Launch site: Baikonur 1/5

End of mission
- Landing date: October 11, 1977, 03:25:20 UTC
- Landing site: 185 kilometres (115 mi) NW of Tselinograd

Orbital parameters
- Reference system: Geocentric
- Regime: Low Earth
- Perigee altitude: 198.5 kilometres (123.3 mi)
- Apogee altitude: 258.1 kilometres (160.4 mi)
- Inclination: 51.66 degrees
- Period: 88.66 minutes

Soyuz 25 (Russian: Союз 25, Union 25) was an October 1977 Soviet crewed space flight, the first to the new Salyut 6 space station, which had been launched 10 days earlier. However, the mission was aborted when cosmonauts Vladimir Kovalyonok and Valery Ryumin failed to engage the docking latches of the station despite five attempts. Lacking sufficient fuel to attempt a dock at the other end of the station and with battery power for only two days, they returned to Earth.

The failure led to a new rule whereby every crew had to have at least one person aboard who had previously flown in space.

== Crew ==
Position	Cosmonaut
Commander	Vladimir Kovalyonok; First spaceflight
Flight engineer	Valery Ryumin; First spaceflight

=== Backup crew ===
Position	Cosmonaut
Commander	Yuri Romanenko
Flight engineer	Aleksandr Ivanchenkov

== Mission highlights ==
Soyuz 25 was launched on 9 October 1977 with a crew of two cosmonauts to dock with the orbiting Salyut 6 space station, which had been launched 10 days earlier, on 29 September. The crew were to stay on board for about 90 days, which would break the Soviet space endurance record, and possibly the all-time record of 84 days held by the crew of Skylab 4. The station was a new version of a Salyut with modifications including a second docking port which allowed supply ships and other crews to visit during the duration of a mission.

The vehicle approached the station the next day, and it contacted the forward port, but the Soyuz craft failed to make a hard dock with the station. The cosmonauts told the ground crew that they had attempted to dock four times, but that the contact light failed to come on. While the crew waited in soft dock – the docking system probe was latched onto the Salyut docking drogue, but the probe had failed to retract and bring the craft together – the ground crew studied the problem.

On the 20th orbit, Kovalenko undocked the Soyuz, and attempted to dock for the fifth time during the 23rd orbit, but failed again. The decision was made to return to Earth, as the Soyuz was equipped with batteries designed to last about two days, and the craft lacked fuel to attempt to dock with the port on the opposite side of the station.

A news release was issued: "At 07.09 Moscow time today (10 October) the automatic rendezvous of the Soyuz 25 ship and the Salyut 6 station was begun. From a distance of 120 metres, the vehicles performed a docking manoeuvre. Due to deviations from the planned procedure for docking, the link-up was called off. The crew has begun making preparations for a return to Earth."

The crew thus had to make an early reentry and landed 185 km (115 mi) northwest of Tselinograd, Kazakhstan on 11 October.

The failure was a serious blow to the Soviets, as their media had given the flight a high profile, noting that the flight had come from the same launchpad as Sputnik 1 and Vostok 1, and coincided with the 60th anniversary of the October Revolution.

The problem was traced later to a faulty mechanism on the Soyuz; this was not discovered until after the Soyuz 26 flight performed an EVA to inspect the second docking port on Salyut 6.

The mission failure resulted in a rule stating that future crews would include at least one cosmonaut who had already flown a space mission. This resulted in the all-rookie backup crew of Aleksandr Ivanchenkov and Yuri Romanenko being paired with veteran cosmonauts for future missions. The rule was not relaxed until 1994 and Soyuz TM-19.

== Mission parameters ==
- Mass: 6,860 kg (15,120 lb)
- Perigee: 198.5 km (123.3 mi)
- Apogee: 258.1 km (160.4 mi)
- Inclination: 51.66°
- Period: 88.66 minutes
