= Yuri Romanenko =

Soviet locksmith, builder, air officer and cosmonaut (born 1944)

- Юрий Романенко
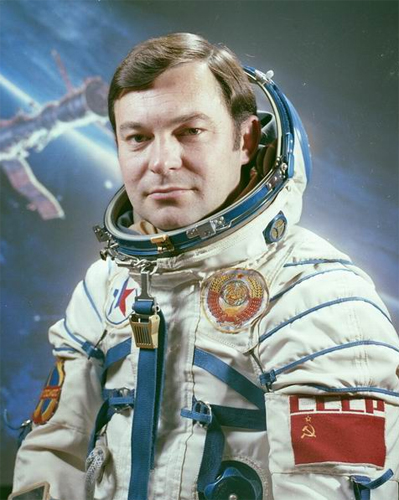
- Born: 1 August 1944 (age 82); Orenburg Oblast, Russian SFSR, Soviet Union
- Occupation: Pilot
- Awards: Hero of the Soviet Union (twice); Hero of the Republic of Cuba
- Space career

Cosmonaut
- Status: Retired
- Rank: Colonel, Soviet Air Force
- Time in space: 430d 18h 21m
- Selection: Air Force Group 5
- Total EVAs: 4 (1 during Salyut 6 EO-1, 3 during Mir EO-2)
- Total EVA time: 10h, 16m
- Missions: Salyut 6 EO-1 (Soyuz 26/Soyuz 27), Salyut 6 EP-8 (Soyuz 38), Mir EO-2 (Soyuz TM-2/Soyuz TM-3)
- Retired: 1988

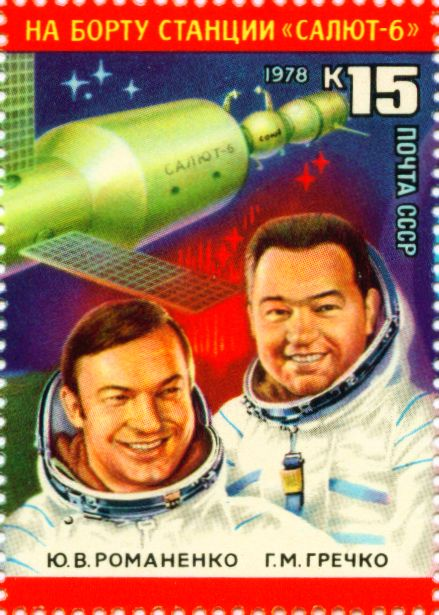
The Salyut 6 cosmonauts—Romanenko and Georgy Grechko—featured on a 1978 postal stamp

Yuri Viktorovich Romanenko (Russian: Ю́рий Ви́кторович Романе́нко; born 1 August 1944) is a former Soviet cosmonaut, twice Hero of the Soviet Union (March 16, 1978 and September 26, 1980). Over his career, Yuri Romanenko spent a total of 430 days 20 hours 21 minutes 30 seconds in space and 18 hours in space walks. In 1987 he was a resident of the Mir space station, launching on Soyuz TM-2 and landing aboard Soyuz TM-3. He remained on Mir for 326 days; that was the longest stay in space at that time. His son, Roman Romanenko is also a cosmonaut, and has become the third second-generation space traveler on Soyuz TMA-15 in May 2009.

== Early life ==
Yuri Romanenko was born on August 1, 1944, in Koltubanovskiy village in Orenburg Oblast, Soviet Union. His father was a senior commander on military ships, and mother was a combat medic. His family later moved to Kaliningrad, where he graduated from a secondary school in 1961. His hobbies in school included building model aircraft and ships, boxing, shooting and underwater fishing. After school, he briefly worked as a locksmith and builder. In 1962 he enrolled at the Chernigov High Air Force School, Ukraine and graduated with honors in 1966. After graduation, he remained with the School, training the students and practicing as a candidate cosmonaut. He was cleared for space flights in 1970, among only 16 other cosmonauts.

== Space missions ==
His first flight was on December 10, 1977, on Soyuz 26 to the space station Salyut 6. A two-men crew consisted of Romanenko as the flight commander and Georgi Grechko as engineer. They spent 96 days and 10 hours on the orbit, meeting Soyuz 27, Soyuz 28 and Progress 1. During the mission, Romanenko performed a one and a half hour long space walk.

In his second mission on September 18, 1980, together with the first Cuban cosmonaut Arnaldo Tamayo Méndez, Romanenko flew Soyuz 38 to Salyut 6 and returned 7 days later. With this flight, Tamayo Méndez was the first hispanophone and first person of African descent in space.

The third and last flight of Romanenko was on Soyuz TM-2 with Aleksandr Laveykin on February 6, 1987, to the Mir station. During that mission, Romanenko spent 326 days aboard Mir, which was the longest stay in space then. He conducted three space walks, on April 11, June 11 and June 16, 1987, with a total duration 8 hr 48 min. He returned to Earth on December 29, 1987, in Soyuz TM-3.

Romanenko retired from flights in 1988 and became the director of Buran program, which was a Soviet alternative to the Space Shuttle. The program completed one flight in 1988 and was cancelled in 1993.

== Accidents ==
While working in Salyut 6 station in 1977, Grechko and Romanenko had to perform spacewalks at will to inspect the potential damage at the station, which precluded docking of Soyuz 25. At some point, they were both in their spacewalk suits in the airlock. Romanenko prepared for a spacewalk and pushed against the wall flying outside, but forgot to attach his safety cord. Grechko managed to grab the cord with one hand, stopping Romanenko. This accident was dramatized in press due to the joke of Grechko who implied Romanenko was on the verge of death. However, the electrical cables attaching Romanenko would have certainly stopped him from leaving the space station.

== Awards ==
During his career he was awarded:

- Twice Hero of the Soviet Union (March 16, 1978 and September 26, 1980);
- Pilot-Cosmonaut of the USSR;
- Three Orders of Lenin (1978, 1980 and 1987));
- Order of the Red Star (1976);
- Medal "For Merit in Space Exploration" (Russian Federation);
- Hero of the Czechoslovak Socialist Republic (1978);
- Hero of the Republic of Cuba (1980);
- Order "Madara Horseman" (Bulgarian Socialist Republic);
- Order of Klement Gottwald (Czechoslovak Socialist Republic);
- Medal "For Strengthening Military Cooperation" (Czechoslovak Socialist Republic).

== Military ranks and skills ==
Romanenko is a professional pilot. He flew Yak-18, L-29, Mig-15, Mig-17 and Mig-21, and had 39 parachute jumps. His military progression was:

- Lieutenant (October 27, 1966)
- Captain (February 3, 1971)
- Major (February 21, 1974)
- Lieutenant Colonel (December 14, 1976)
- Colonel (March 17, 1978)
- Discharged from military service on October 2, 1995, because of reaching the age limit.

== Personal life ==
Romanenko has a half-brother, Vladimir (born in 1940), and a sister, Olga (born in 1954). He is married and has two sons, Roman (born on August 9, 1971) and Artem (born May 17, 1977). Roman is a cosmonaut who flew as the commander of Soyuz TMA-15 mission.

Through most of his life, Yuri Romanenko was keen to underwater fishing and other aquatic activities. In space, he started composing and singing his own songs. After the Romanenko-Méndez flight and retirement of Romanenko in 1988, he and his family were invited to Cuba, where he was personally met by Fidel Castro. Knowing that Romanenko was partial to hunting and underwater fishing, Castro had organized a social tour and participated in the fishing, freediving with Romanenko to a 10-meter depth.
