= Vladimir Dzhanibekov =

Soviet general, pilot and cosmonaut (born 1942)

- Владимир Джанибеков
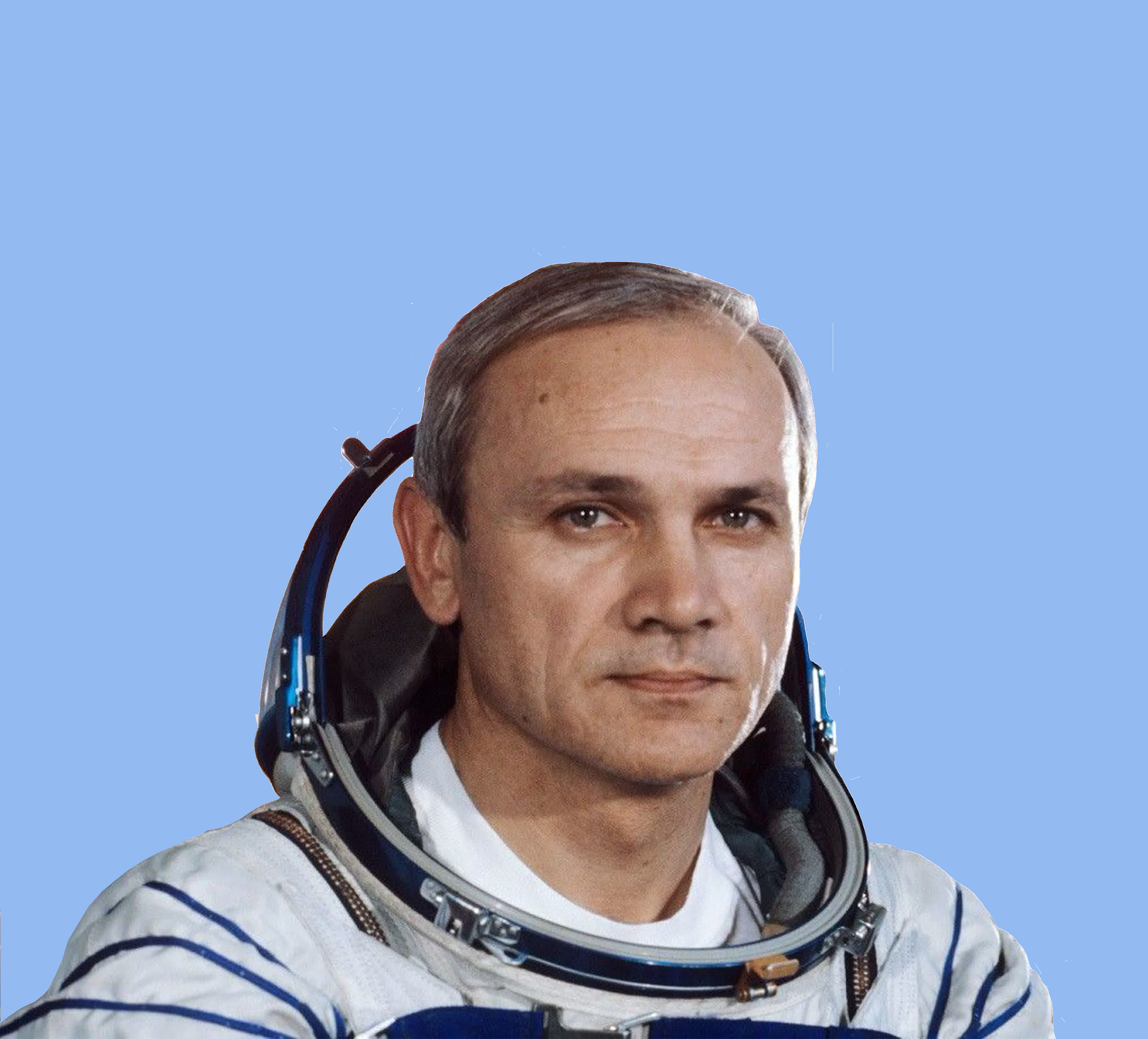
- Born: 13 May 1942 (age 84); Iskandar, Uzbek SSR, Soviet Union (now Uzbekistan)
- Education: Leningrad University and Rostov University; physics.; Yeisk Military Flight Academy; mil. pilot with instructor certificate, grad. 1965.
- Occupation: Military pilot
- Known for: Salyut-7 rescue mission; Dzhanibekov effect
- Awards: Hero of the Soviet Union (2); Order of Lenin (5); Order of the Red Star; Commander, Legion of Honour (France)
- Space career

Cosmonaut
- Status: Retired
- Rank: Major General, Soviet Air Force
- Time in space: 145d 15h 56m
- Selection: Air Force Group 5 (USSR)
- Total EVAs: 2
- Total EVA time: 8h 35m
- Missions: Soyuz 27/Soyuz 26 (Salyut 6 EP-1), Soyuz 39 (Salyut 6 EP-9), Soyuz T-6 (Salyut 7 EP-1), Soyuz T-12 (Salyut 7 EP-4), Soyuz T-13 (Salyut 7 EO-4-1b)

Vladimir Aleksandrovich Dzhanibekov (Russian: Владимир Александрович Джанибеков, born 13 May 1942) is a retired Soviet Air Force Major General and a cosmonaut veteran of five orbital missions. Notably he was part of the Salyut-7 rescue mission and also discovered the Dzhanibekov Effect on that same mission, a logical consequence of the Tennis racket theorem.

== Biography ==
Dzhanibekov was born Vladimir Aleksandrovich Krysin (Russian: Владимир Александрович Крысин) in the remote area of Iskandar in what was then Bostanliq District, South Kazakhstan Region, Kazakh SSR (since 1956 – Tashkent Region, Uzbekistan) on 13 May 1942. His family moved to Tashkent soon after his birth.

In 1964 he married Liliya Munirovna Dzhanibekova, who was a descendant of Janibeg, medieval ruler of the Golden Horde. As her father had no sons, Dzhanibekov took his wife's family name in order to honour her ancestry and continue her line of descent, an unusual step for a husband in the Soviet Union.

In 1960 he entered Leningrad University to study physics, where he became involved in flying, something in which he had always been interested. In 1961 he decided to enroll in the V. M. Komarov Higher Military Flying School at Yeisk while simultaneously completing his degree in physics at the Taganrog campus of Rostov State University. Four years later he graduated and became a flying instructor in the Soviet Air Forces serving at military training unit number 99735 in Taganrog in 1968–1970. During the 1970 visit of Gherman Titov to the Taganrog-based Air Forces training unit he was selected into the cosmonaut training pool Air Force Group 5. He joined the Communist Party the same year.

Dzhanibekov served on five space missions: Soyuz 27/Soyuz 26 (launch/return), Soyuz 39, Soyuz T-6, Soyuz T-12, and Soyuz T-13. He accrued 145 days, 15 hours, and 56 minutes in space over these five missions. He had also performed two EVAs with the total time of 8 hours and 35 minutes. In 1985 he demonstrated stable and unstable rotation of a T-handle nut from the orbit, subsequently named the Dzhanibekov effect. The effect had been long known from the tennis racket theorem, which says that rotation about an object's intermediate principal axis is unstable while in free fall.

In 1985 he was promoted to the rank of major general. After retiring from the cosmonaut program in 1986, he became involved in politics. He was the Deputy to the Supreme Soviet of Uzbek SSR from 1985 until 1990. Also, he has taken up photography and painting, and his works, predominantly of space thematics, are owned by museums and private collectors.

Starting 1990, Dzhanibekov unsuccessfully attempted to circumnavigate the globe by balloon. He partnered with Larry Newman who envisioned flying a NASA-designed sky anchor balloon. This unique hourglass shaped design used a zero pressure helium balloon for buoyancy and a superpressure balloon for variable ballast. Manufactured by Raven Industries, the double balloon system together measured 354 feet (108 m) tall. A proof of concept flight, launched from Tillamook, Oregon on 8 September 1990, was crewed by Dzhanibekov, Newman, Tim Lachenmeier, and Don Moses. Moses replaced Richard Branson, who was unable to make it by the weather window departure time. The flight lasted for continuous 31 hours, spanning two nights, before landing at Omak, Washington, and confirmed the sky anchor balloon nominal performance. Dzhanibekov, Larry Newman, and Don Moses piloted the Earthwinds Hilton balloon which was primarily sponsored by Barron Hilton. In 1992 an attempt from Akron, Ohio did not launch due to strong winds. The next attempt was a planned pre-dawn launch but was delayed for several hours by difficulties inflating both balloons. Launching later than desired, on 13 January 1993 the Earthwinds liftoff from Reno Stead Airport flew for 30 minutes before crashing. The balloon could not penetrate a strong inversion layer and tore the ballast balloon on a mountain peak. The three crewmen survived the crash without injuries. An additional flight on 31 December 1994 reached 29,000 feet (8,800 m) when the ballast balloon failed. These sky anchor balloon failures prompted other circumnavigation attempts to switch to the Roziere balloon system instead.

The minor planet 3170 Dzhanibekov, discovered by Soviet astronomer Nikolai Stepanovich Chernykh in 1979, is named after him.

== In popular culture ==
The 2017 Russian film Salyut 7 is a fictionalized version of Dzhanibekov's 1985 mission to the space station. A character based on Dzhanibekov (named Vladimir Fyodorov) is the main protagonist of the film.

== Honours and awards ==
- Twice Hero of the Soviet Union (1978 and 1981)
- Pilot-Cosmonaut of the USSR
- Order of Friendship (Russian Federation)
- Five Orders of Lenin
- Order of the Red Star
- Order "For Service to the Homeland in the Armed Forces of the USSR" 3rd class
- Medal "For Merit in Space Exploration" (Russian Federation)
- Jubilee Medal "Twenty Years of Victory in the Great Patriotic War 1941–1945"
- Jubilee Medal "50 Years of the Armed Forces of the USSR"
- Jubilee Medal "60 Years of the Armed Forces of the USSR"
- Jubilee Medal "50 Years of the Soviet Militia"
- Medals "For Impeccable Service" 1st, 2nd, and 3rd classes
- Kosmonavtlar metro station in Tashkent commemorates Uzbekistan's contribution to the Soviet space programme including that of Dzhanibekov

Foreign awards:

- Hero of the Mongolian People's Republic
- Commander of the Legion of Honour (France)
- Order of the Banner of the Hungarian People's Republic
- Order of Sukhbaatar (Mongolia)

He is an honorary citizen of Gagarin; Kaluga (Russia); Arkalyk (Kazakhstan); Baikonur (Kazakhstan); and Houston (United States).

== See also ==
- Tennis racket theorem, or Dzhanibekov effect, a theorem in dynamics involving the stability of a rotating body with different moments of inertia along each axis.
