= Soyuz 26 =

Crewed flight of the Soyuz programme

- COSPAR ID: 1977-113A
- SATCAT no.: 10506
- Mission duration: 37 days, 10 hours, 6 minutes, 18 seconds
- Orbits completed: 1,522

Spacecraft properties
- Spacecraft type: Soyuz 7K-T
- Manufacturer: NPO Energia
- Launch mass: 6,800 kilograms (15,000 lb)

Crew
- Crew size: 2
- Launching: Yuri Romanenko; Georgi Grechko
- Landing: Vladimir Dzhanibekov; Oleg Makarov
- Callsign: Таймыр (Taymyr - "Taymyr Peninsula"

Start of mission
- Launch date: 10 December 1977, 01:18:40 UTC
- Rocket: Soyuz-U
- Launch site: Baikonur 1/5

End of mission
- Landing date: 16 January 1978, 11:24:58 UTC
- Landing site: 265 kilometres (165 mi) W of Tselinograd

Orbital parameters
- Reference system: Geocentric
- Regime: Low Earth
- Perigee altitude: 193 kilometres (120 mi)
- Apogee altitude: 246 kilometres (153 mi)
- Inclination: 51.65 degrees
- Period: 88.67 minutes

Docking with Salyut 6

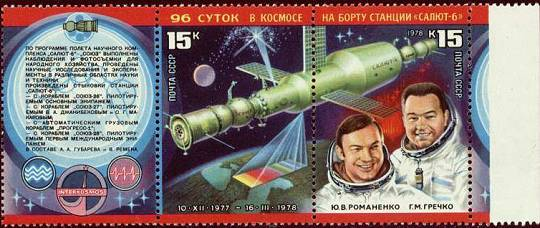
Soyuz 26

Soyuz 26 (Russian: Союз 26, Union 26) was a Soviet space mission which launched the crew of Salyut 6 EO-1, the first long duration crew on the space station Salyut 6.

The Soyuz spacecraft was launched on 10 December 1977, and docked with the space station the next day. Soyuz 27 arrived at the station in January 1978, and its two-person crew transferred into the Soyuz 26 spacecraft to undock and land a few days later.

== Crew ==
Position	Launching Cosmonaut	Landing Cosmonaut
Commander	Yuri Romanenko; EO-1; First spaceflight	Vladimir Dzhanibekov; EP-1; First spaceflight
Flight engineer	Georgi Grechko; EO-1; Second spaceflight	Oleg Makarov; EP-1; Third spaceflight

=== Backup crew ===
Position	Cosmonaut
Commander	Vladimir Kovalyonok
Flight engineer	Aleksandr Ivanchenkov
The launching and landing crews had the same backups

== Mission parameters ==
- Mass: 6,800 kg (15,000 lb)
- Perigee: 193 km (120 mi)
- Apogee: 246 km (153 mi)
- Inclination: 51.65°
- Period: 88.67 minutes
