= Soyuz 27 =

Space mission of the Sojuz program

- Mission type: Crewed mission to Salyut 6
- Operator: OKB-1
- COSPAR ID: 1978-003A
- SATCAT no.: 10560
- Mission duration: 65 days
- Orbits completed: 1025

Spacecraft properties
- Spacecraft: Soyuz s/n 44
- Spacecraft type: Soyuz 7K-T
- Manufacturer: NPO Energia
- Launch mass: 6800 kg

Crew
- Crew size: 2
- Launching: Vladimir Dzhanibekov; Oleg Makarov
- Landing: Yuri Romanenko; Georgy Grechko
- Callsign: Памир Pamir; Pamir Mountains

Start of mission
- Launch date: 10 January 1978, 12:26:00 UTC
- Rocket: Soyuz-U s/n D15000-106
- Launch site: Baikonur, Site 1/5
- Contractor: OKB-1

End of mission
- Landing date: 16 March 1978, 11:18:47 UTC
- Landing site: 310 km at west of Tselinograd

Orbital parameters
- Reference system: Geocentric
- Regime: Low Earth
- Perigee altitude: 198.9 km
- Apogee altitude: 253.8 km
- Inclination: 51.65°
- Period: 88.73 minutes

Docking with Salyut 6
- Docking date: 11 January 1978, 14:05:54 UTC
- Undocking date: 16 March 1978, 07:58:00 UTC

Soyuz 27 (Russian: Союз 27, Union 27) was a 1978 Soviet crewed spacecraft which flew to the orbiting Salyut 6 space station, during the mission EP-1. It was the third crewed flight to the station, the second successful docking and the first visitation mission. Once docked, it marked the first time that three spacecraft were docked together.

The main function of the EP-1 mission was to swap Soyuz craft with the orbiting crew, in so doing freeing a docking port for a forthcoming supply tanker. Cosmonauts Vladimir Dzhanibekov and Oleg Makarov returned to Earth in the Soyuz 26 spacecraft after spending five days on the station. The descent module is displayed at the Sergei Pavlovich Korolyov Museum of Cosmonautics in Zhytomyr, Ukraine.

== Crew ==
Position	Launching Cosmonaut	Landing Cosmonaut
Commander	Vladimir Dzhanibekov; EP-1; First spaceflight	Yuri Romanenko; EO-1; First spaceflight
Flight engineer	Oleg Makarov; EP-1; Third spaceflight	Georgy Grechko; EO-1; Second spaceflight

=== Backup crew ===
Position	Cosmonaut
Commander	Vladimir Kovalyonok
Flight engineer	Aleksandr Ivanchenkov
The launching and landing crews had the same backups

== Mission parameters ==
- Mass: 6,800 kilograms (15,000 lb)
- Perigee: 198.9 kilometres (123.6 mi)
- Apogee: 253.8 kilometres (157.7 mi)
- Inclination: 51.65°
- Period: 88.73 minutes
