= Georgy Grechko =

Soviet cosmonaut (1931–2017)

- Георгий Гречко
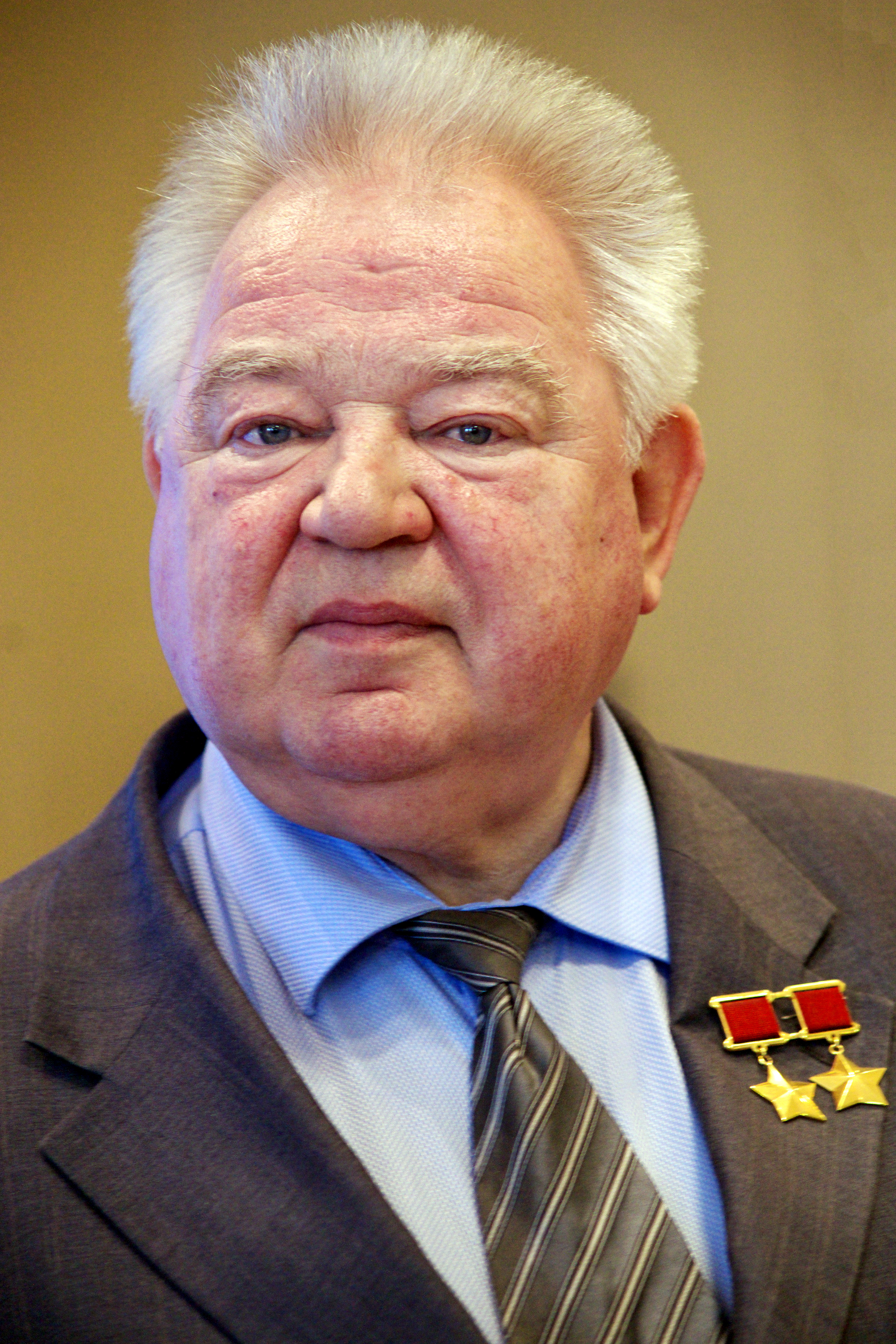
- Grechko in 2011
- Born: May 25, 1931; Leningrad, Soviet Union
- Died: April 8, 2017 (aged 85); Moscow, Russia
- Occupation: Engineer
- Awards: Hero of the Soviet Union (2)
- Space career

Cosmonaut
- Time in space: 134d 20h 32m
- Selection: Civilian Specialist Group 3
- Missions: Soyuz 17 (Salyut 4 EO-1), Soyuz 26/Soyuz 27 (Salyut 6 EO-1), Soyuz T-14/Soyuz T-13 (Salyut 7 EP-5)
- Georgij Grechko's voice Grechko's interview on the Echo of Moscow program, 23 January 2008

Georgy Mikhaylovich Grechko (Russian: Георгий Михайлович Гречко; 25 May 1931 – 8 April 2017) was a Soviet cosmonaut. He flew to space on three missions, each bound for rendezvous with a different Salyut space station. Soyuz 17 was the first crewed vehicle to visit Salyut 4, Soyuz 26 was the first crewed vehicle to visit Salyut 6, and Soyuz T-14 visited Salyut 7. During the latter mission, Grechko helped to relieve the crew of Soyuz T-13, who had repaired damage to the station.

== Biography ==
Grechko graduated from the Leningrad Institute of Mechanics with a doctorate in mathematics. He was a member of Communist Party of the Soviet Union. He went on to work at Sergei Korolev's design bureau and from there was selected for cosmonaut training for the Soviet Moon programme. When that program was cancelled, he went on to work on the Salyut space stations.

Grechko made the first spacewalk in an Orlan space suit on 20 December 1977 during the Salyut 6 EO-1 mission.

He was twice awarded the medal of Hero of the Soviet Union.

He resigned from the space programme in 1992 to lecture on atmospheric physics at the Russian Academy of Sciences. Grechko has written his memoirs as "Космонавт No. 34: От лучины до пришельцев," (Cosmonaut No. 34 From Splinter to Aliens) Olma Media Grupp, Moscow, 2013.

A minor planet 3148 Grechko discovered by Soviet astronomer Nikolai Stepanovich Chernykh in 1979 is named after him.

Grechko had a brief cameo role in Richard Viktorov's 1981 film Per Aspera Ad Astra, and as a result attained pop culture status in his home city of Leningrad. He also appeared in the 1979 film Under the Constellation Gemini.

Grechko, along with Alexei Leonov, Vitaly Sevastyanov, and Rusty Schweickart established the Association of Space Explorers in 1984. Membership is open to all people who have flown in outer space.

Grechko died aged 85 as a result of several chronic illnesses. He was survived by wife Lyudmila and daughter Olga.

== Soyuz–Salyut missions ==
Georgy Grechko's first mission to space began during the winter of 1974, when he and fellow Soviet cosmonaut Aleksei Gubarev were crewmen of the Soyuz 17-Salyut 4 mission. The Soyuz 17 rocket launched on 26 December 1974 and successfully docked with the Salyut 4 Space Station on 12 January 1975. This successful docking marked only the second complete success in five Soyuz-Salyut undertakings. The cosmonauts spent the remainder of their mission aboard the three room, 20 ton station. During their time aboard the Salyut 4 Space Station, Grechko and Gubarev conducted a wide range of studies that included infrared temperature scans of earth's upper atmosphere, stellar observations and X-ray studies of the sun. In order to maintain fitness in weightlessness, Grechko spent up to two hours a day exercising on a bicycle and treadmill, as well as experimenting with wearing negative pressure suits. Grechko and Gubarev spent a total of 30 days in orbit, which set the Soviet record at the time, before returning safely on 9 February 1975.

In December 1977, Georgy Grechko returned to space with Yuri Romanenko during the Soyuz 26-Salyut 6 mission. The crew boarded the Soviet Salyut 6 Space Station, where they would stay long enough to eclipse the 84-day record set in 1974 by US Skylab astronauts Gerald Carr, William Pogue, and Edward Gibson. In January 1978, Grechko and Romanenko were joined by fellow cosmonauts Vladimir Dzhanibekov and Oleg Makarov, who linked their Soyuz 27 craft with the Salyut 6 Space Station and spent five days aboard the station along with Grechko and Romanenko, before returning to earth in Soyuz 26 craft. This event marked the first double docking and first double crew occupancy of a space station. On March 4, Grechko and Romanenko were joined by a different Soviet crew, consisting of Aleksei Gubarev (Grechko's partner from his previous mission) and Czechoslavakian Vladimir Raemk, the first non-Russian cosmonaut.

The crew members of the Salyut 6 Space Station became the first men to carry out a systematic visual-instrumental observation of the earth. Their extended stay is what allowed the crew to pull off such an observation, as it takes two to three weeks for human eyesight to adapt to conditions in orbit. After several weeks in orbit, the members of the Salyut 6 crew were able to examine the finer details of the landscape, which included the traces left on the water surface by typhoons, enormous solitary waves that were over 100 kilometers long, and some of the characteristic features of the ocean floor. On March 15, after spending a record-setting total of 96 days in orbit, Grechko and Romanenko finally left the Salyut 6 Space Station and returned to earth aboard the Soyuz 27 spacecraft. After spending such an extended period of time in orbit, the crew began an expanded exercise routine a week prior to departure that was intended to minimize the effects of the return to normal gravity. Despite this training, both Grechko and Romanenko struggled to complete easy tasks shortly following their return, such as turning a radio dial or lifting a cup of tea. Fortunately, neither cosmonaut reported any serious readjustment issues.

== Honours and awards ==
- Twice Hero of the Soviet Union
- Pilot-Cosmonaut of the USSR
- Three Orders of Lenin
- Medal "For Merit in Space Exploration"
- Medal "For Distinguished Labour"
- Jubilee Medal "In Commemoration of the 100th Anniversary since the Birth of Vladimir Il'ich Lenin"
- Medal "For the Development of Virgin Lands"
- Honorary membership in the Danish Astronautical Society
- Distinguished Member, Association of Space Explorers

== See also ==
- Sputnik-1

== Literature ==
- "Cosmonaut No. 34. From a sliver to aliens" (G.M. Grechko, 2013, OLMA Media Group)
- S.P. Korolev. Encyclopedia of life and creativity – edited by C. A. Lopota, RSC Energia. S.P. Korolev, 2014 ISBN 978-5-906674-04-3
- The official website of the city administration Baikonur – Honorary citizens of Baikonur
