= List of human spaceflights to Salyut space stations =

This is a chronological list of human spaceflights to the Salyut space stations. Prior to Salyut 6, flights were referred to by the designation of the Soyuz spacecraft that transported the crew to and from the station. Flights to Salyut 6 and Salyut 7 were numbered either EO-n" for long-term expedition crews, or EP-n" for short-term visiting or taxi crews, where n was sequentially increased with each flight of that type to that particular station. Salyut commanders are listed in italics. "Duration" refers to the crew and does not always correspond to "Flight up" or "Flight down". Missions which failed to reach or dock with the station are listed in red. All cosmonauts are Soviet unless otherwise indicated.

The Salyut programme was a series of Soviet space stations launched during the 1970s and 1980s. Six Salyut space stations were crewed in addition to a number of prototypes and failures. Crewed flights as part of the Salyut programme ended in 1986 as efforts were shifted to Mir.

== Salyut 1 ==
Expedition	Crew	Launch (GMT)	Flight up	Landing (GMT)	Flight down	Duration (days)	Remarks
—	Vladimir Shatalov; Aleksei Yeliseyev; Nikolai Rukavishnikov	23 April 1971; 23:54	Soyuz 10	25 April 1971; 23:40	Soyuz 10	2.01	Soft docking was successful, hard docking failed.
—	Georgy Dobrovolsky; Vladislav Volkov; Viktor Patsayev	6 June 1971; 07:55	Soyuz 11	30 June 1971; 02:16	Soyuz 11	23.76	Cosmonauts died at cabin depressurisation. Only persons to die above 100 km (62 mi).

== Salyut 3 ==
Expedition	Crew	Launch (GMT)	Flight up	Landing (GMT)	Flight down	Duration (days)	Remarks
—	Pavel Popovich; Yuri Artyukhin	3 July 1974; 18:51	Soyuz 14	19 July 1974; 12:21	Soyuz 14	15.73	
—	Gennadi Sarafanov; Lev Dyomin	26 August 1974; 19:58	Soyuz 15	28 August 1974; 20:10	Soyuz 15	2.01	Failed to dock

== Salyut 4 ==
Expedition	Crew	Launch (GMT)	Flight up	Landing (GMT)	Flight down	Duration (days)	Remarks
—	Aleksei Gubarev; Georgi Grechko	11 January 1975; 21:43	Soyuz 17	10 February 1975; 11:03	Soyuz 17	29.56	
—	Vasily Lazarev; Oleg Makarov	5 April 1975; 11:04	Soyuz 7K-T #39	5 April 1975; 11:26	Soyuz 7K-T #39	0.02	Failed to orbit
—	Pyotr Klimuk; Vitali Sevastyanov	24 May 1975; 14:58	Soyuz 18	26 July 1975; 14:18	Soyuz 18	62.97	

== Salyut 5 ==
Expedition	Crew	Launch (GMT)	Flight up	Landing (GMT)	Flight down	Duration (days)	Remarks
—	Boris Volynov; Vitali Zholobov	6 July 1976; 12:08	Soyuz 21	24 August 1976; 18:32	Soyuz 21	49.27	
—	Vyacheslav Zudov; Valery Rozhdestvensky	14 October 1976; 17:39	Soyuz 23	16 October 1976; 17:45	Soyuz 23	2.00	Failed to dock
—	Viktor Gorbatko; Yury Glazkov	7 February 1977; 16:11	Soyuz 24	25 February 1977; 09:38	Soyuz 24	17.73	

== Salyut 6 ==
Expedition	Crew	Launch (GMT)	Flight up	Landing (GMT)	Flight down	Duration (days)	Remarks
—	Vladimir Kovalyonok; Valery Ryumin	9 November 1977; 02:40	Soyuz 25	11 November 1977; 03:25	Soyuz 25	2.03	Failed to dock
EO-1	Yury Romanenko; Georgy Grechko	10 December 1977; 01:18	Soyuz 26	16 March 1978; 11:18	Soyuz 27	96.42	
EP-1	Vladimir Dzhanibekov; Oleg Makarov	10 January 1978; 12:26	Soyuz 27	16 January 1978; 11:24	Soyuz 26	5.96	
EP-2	Aleksei Gubarev (Czechoslovakia) Vladimír Remek	2 March 1978; 15:28	Soyuz 28	10 March 1978; 13:44	Soyuz 28	7.93	
EO-2	Vladimir Kovalyonok; Aleksandr Ivanchenkov	15 June 1978; 20:16	Soyuz 29	2 November 1978; 11:04	Soyuz 31	139.62	
EP-3	Pyotr Klimuk (Poland) Mirosław Hermaszewski	27 June 1978; 15:27	Soyuz 30	5 July 1978; 13:30	Soyuz 30	7.92	
EP-4	Valery Bykovsky (East Germany) Sigmund Jähn	26 August 1978; 14:51	Soyuz 31	31 September 1978; 11:40	Soyuz 29	7.87	
EO-3	Vladimir Lyakhov; Valery Ryumin	25 February 1979; 11:53	Soyuz 32	19 August 1979; 12:29	Soyuz 34	175.02	
—	Nikolai Rukavishnikov (Bulgaria) Georgi Ivanov	10 April 1979; 17:34	Soyuz 33	12 April 1979; 16:35	Soyuz 33	1.96	Failed to dock
EO-4	Leonid Popov; Valery Ryumin	9 April 1980; 13:38	Soyuz 35	11 October 1980; 09:49	Soyuz 37	184.84	
EP-5	Valery Kubasov (Hungary) Bertalan Farkas	26 May 1980; 18:20	Soyuz 36	3 June 1980; 15:06	Soyuz 35	7.87	
EP-6	Yury Malyshev; Vladimir Aksyonov	5 June 1980; 14:19	Soyuz T-2	9 June 1980; 12:39	Soyuz T-2	3.93	
EP-7	Viktor Gorbatko (Vietnam) Phạm Tuân	23 July 1980; 18:33	Soyuz 37	July 31, 1980; 15:15	Soyuz 36	7.86	
EP-8	Yury Romanenko (Cuba) Arnaldo Tamayo Méndez	18 September 1980; 19:11	Soyuz 38	26 September 1980; 15:54	Soyuz 38	7.86	
EO-5	Leonid Kizim; Oleg Makarov; Gennady Strekalov	27 November 1980; 14:18	Soyuz T-3	10 December 1980; 09:26	Soyuz T-3	12.80	
EO-6	Vladimir Kovalyonok; Viktor Savinykh	12 March 1981; 19:00	Soyuz T-4	26 May 1981; 12:37	Soyuz T-4	74.73	
EP-9	Vladimir Dzhanibekov (Mongolia) Jügderdemidiin Gürragchaa	22 March 1981; 14:58	Soyuz 39	30 March 1981; 11:40	Soyuz 39	7.86	
EP-10	Leonid Popov (Romania) Dumitru Prunariu	14 May 1981; 17:16	Soyuz 40	22 May 1981; 13:58	Soyuz 40	7.86	

== Salyut 7 ==
Expedition	Crew	Launch (GMT)	Flight up	Landing (GMT)	Flight down	Duration (days)	Remarks
EO-1	Anatoli Berezovoy; Valentin Lebedev	13 May 1982; 09:58	Soyuz T-5	10 December 1982; 19:02	Soyuz T-7	211.38	
EP-1	Vladimir Dzhanibekov; Aleksandr Ivanchenkov (France) Jean-Loup Chrétien	24 June 1982; 16:29	Soyuz T-6	2 July 1982; 14:20	Soyuz T-6	7.91	
EP-2	Leonid Popov; Aleksandr Serebrov; Svetlana Savitskaya	19 August 1982; 17:11	Soyuz T-7	27 August 1982; 15:04	Soyuz T-5	7.91	
—	Vladimir Titov; Gennadi Strekalov; Aleksandr Serebrov	20 April 1983; 13:10	Soyuz T-8	22 April 1983; 13:28	Soyuz T-8	2.01	Failed to dock
EO-2	Vladimir Lyakhov; Aleksandr Pavlovich Aleksandrov	27 June 1983; 09:12	Soyuz T-9	23 November 1983; 19:58	Soyuz T-9	149.45	
—	Vladimir Titov; Gennadi Strekalov	26 September 1983; 19:37	Soyuz 7K-ST #16L	26 September 1983; 19:43	Soyuz 7K-ST #16L	0.00	Failed to orbit
EO-3	Leonid Kizim; Vladimir Solovyov; Oleg Atkov	8 February 1984; 12:07	Soyuz T-10	2 October 1984; 10:57	Soyuz T-11	236.95	
EP-3	Yury Malyshev; Gennadi Strekalov (India) Rakesh Sharma	3 April 1984; 13:08	Soyuz T-11	11 April 1984; 10:48	Soyuz T-10	7.90	
EP-4	Vladimir Dzhanibekov; Svetlana Savitskaya; Igor Volk	17 July 1984; 17:40	Soyuz T-12	29 July 1984; 12:55	Soyuz T-12	11.80	
EO-4	Vladimir Dzhanibekov	6 June 1985; 06:39	Soyuz T-13	26 September 1985; 09:51	Soyuz T-13	112.13	
EO-4	Viktor Savinykh	6 June 1985; 06:39	Soyuz T-13	21 November 1985; 10:31	Soyuz T-14	168.16	
EO-4	Vladimir Vasyutin; Aleksandr Volkov	17 September 1985; 12:38	Soyuz T-14	21 November 1985; 10:31	Soyuz T-14	64.91	
EP-5	Georgi Grechko	17 September 1985; 12:38	Soyuz T-14	26 September 1985; 09:51	Soyuz T-13	8.88	
EO-5	Leonid Kizim; Vladimir Solovyov	13 March 1986; 12:33	Soyuz T-15	16 July 1986; 12:34	Soyuz T-15	125.00	Also visited Mir as Mir EO-1

== See also ==
- Salyut programme
- List of Salyut expeditions
- List of Salyut visitors
- List of Salyut spacewalks
- List of uncrewed spaceflights to Salyut space stations
- List of human spaceflights to Mir
- List of human spaceflights to the International Space Station
