= Mongolian Air Force =

Aerial warfare branch of Mongolia's military

- Монгол Улсын Зэвсэгт Хүчний Агаарын цэрэг
- Emblem of the Mongolian Air Force
- Founded: February 21, 1925; January 26, 1990(replacing the Mongolian People's Republic Air Corps)
- Country: Mongolia
- Type: Air force
- Role: Aerial warfare
- Size: 1,500
- Part of: Mongolian Armed Forces
- Engagements: Battles of Khalkhin Gol; Soviet–Japanese border conflicts; Soviet invasion of Manchuria; Battle of Baitag Bogd

Commanders
- Commander: Colonel T. Ganbat
- Chief of Staff: Brigadier-General B. Batbayar
- Notable commanders: Hamza Zaisanov

Insignia
- Flag

- Combat Banner

- Fin flash

Aircraft flown
- Fighter: Su-30SM
- Helicopter: Mi-171
- Trainer: MiG-29UB
- Transport: An-26

The Mongolian Air Force (Mongolian: Монгол Улсын Зэвсэгт Хүчний Агаарын цэрэг) is the air force service branch of the Mongolian Armed Forces.

== History ==
=== Early years and WWII ===
The Mongolian Air Force was established on February 21, 1925. On 25 May 1925, a Junkers F.13 piloted by Lieutenant Colonel D. Shatarragchaa entered service as the first aircraft in Mongolian civil and military aviation, landing in Mongolia that day. By 1935 Soviet aircraft were based in the country. In May 1937 the air force was renamed the Mongolian People's Republic Air Corps. During 1939–1945 the Soviets delivered Polikarpov I-15s, Polikarpov I-16s, Yak-9s and Ilyushin Il-2s.

=== Cold War ===
Former insignias (1949-1992)

Roundel

Fin flash

By 1966 the first S-75 Dvina SAM units entered service, and the air force was renamed the Air Force of the Mongolian People's Republic. The MiG-15UTI and MiG-17 the first combat jet aircraft in the Mongolian inventory, entered service in 1970 and by the mid-1970s was joined by 25 MiG-21s, Mi-8s and Ka-26s. Jügderdemidiin Gürragchaa, the first Mongolian to fly into space, was born on 5 December 1947, in the Gurvan-Bulak settlement of Bulgan Province, into the family of a cattle-breeder. He graduated from a military school of aircraft technicians in the Soviet Union. In 1972 he was enrolled at the Zhukovsky Air Force Academy. After graduating from the academy, he worked as an aircraft equipment engineer in an air squadron of the Mongolian People's Army. In 1978, Jugderdemidiyn Gurragchaa started training at Gagarin cosmonauts' training center and completed a course of training under the Intercosmos program. His flight with Vladimir Dzhanibekov on Soyuz 39 as a Research Cosmonaut, launched 22 March 1981, lasted 7 days, 20 hours, 42 minutes, 3 seconds. He later became the head of a scientific institute in Ulan Bator and eventually Mongolian Minister of Defence.

The Civil Air Transport Administration, responsible for Mongolian Airlines (MIAT), was thought to be affiliated with the air force. All airline pilots had military ranks, and they flew Soviet-built transport aircraft on crop dusting, forest and steppe fire patrol, and air ambulance missions. During the mid-1960s the USSR assisted the People's Republic of Mongolia in setting up an air defense system, which also was closely coordinated with the Soviet Air Defence Forces.

=== Since 1989 ===
After the end of the Cold War and the advent of the Democratic Revolution, the air force was effectively grounded due to a lack of fuel and spare parts. Due to a complete lack of resources, as of 2006 Mongolia did not anticipate being able to reform its flying Air Force in the foreseeable future. However, as air defense is part of the Air Force, the US was pursuing specific training line items in this field as well as air-related fields that may support peacekeeping deployments and operations (For example, slots to the United States Army Air Defense Artillery Branch officer basic course, tarmac security, and cargo load planning).

=== Modern air force ===
The government has been trying to revive the air force since 2001. The current Armed Forces maintains an Air Forces Defense Command (Агаарын довтолгооноос хамгаалах цэргийн командлал), under the command of the General Staff. The country has the goal of developing a full air force in the future.

== Units ==
- Unit 303 - MiG-29UB
- Unit 337 - Mi-24V(Mi-35)/Mi-171E
- Unit 126 - Su-30SM
- Unit 061 - SAM
- Unit 325 - SAM
- Unit 353 - SAM

== Equipment ==
Russia's 2008 decision to provide to Mongolia around $120 million worth of conventional weapons and other military equipment, including MI-24 attack helicopters and possibly materials, fighter jets, has drawn renewed attention to the bilateral relationship. Although the terms of the deal were not initially clear, it would be a combination of grant aid and low-interest loans.

In 2011, the Ministry of Defense announced that they would buy MiG-29s from Russia by the end of the year, but this did not materialize, but two MiG 29 were donated in 2019, four more later in 2021. From 2007 – 2011 the fleet of MiG-21s was reduced.

In October 2012 the Ministry of Defense returned an Airbus A310-300 to MIAT Mongolian Airlines. In 2013 the Air Force looked at buying three Lockheed Martin C-130J planes, however a deal was never reached.

The first Su-30SM fighter arrived on January 26, 2019, and four have been delivered so far.

=== Aircraft ===
Aircraft	Origin	Type	Variant	In service	Notes
Combat aircraft
Sukhoi Su-30	Russia	Multirole fighter	Su-30SM	4	
Trainers
Mikoyan MiG-29	Russia	Supersonic trainer	MiG-29UB	6	
Helicopters
Mil Mi-17	Soviet Union	Transport	Mi-171E/Sh	11	

=== Air defense ===
Name	Type	Quantity	Origin	Notes
S-75 Dvina	Surface-to-air missile	6 batteries	Russia	
S-125 Neva	Surface-to-air missile	2 batteries	Russia	
9K31 Strela-1	Surface-to-air missile	8 batteries	Russia	Upgraded to a Strela-1M Standard.
ZPU-4	Anti-aircraft gun	150	Soviet Union	
ZU-23-2	Anti-aircraft gun	150	Soviet Union	
AZP S-60	Anti-aircraft gun	150	Soviet Union	

=== Retired aircraft ===
Former aircraft operated by the Mongolian Air Force includes: Lavochkin La-5, Polikarpov I-15 and I-16 fighters, Tupolev TB-3 bombers, Polikarpov R-5 reconnaissance bombers, Polikarpov Po-2, Antonov An-2, Ilyushin Il-14, Antonov An-12 and Lisunov Li-2 transports, Yakovlev Yak-11, and Yak-18 trainers, MiG-15 and MiG-21 jet fighters, MiG-23 multirole fighters, Mil Mi-4 and Mi-24 helicopters.
