= Soyuz T-3 =

1980 Soviet crewed spaceflight to Salyut 6

- COSPAR ID: 1980-094A
- SATCAT no.: 12077
- Mission duration: 12 days, 19 hours, 7 minutes, 42 seconds
- Orbits completed: 204

Spacecraft properties
- Spacecraft type: Soyuz-T
- Manufacturer: NPO Energia
- Launch mass: 6,850 kilograms (15,100 lb)

Crew
- Crew size: 3
- Members: Leonid Kizim; Oleg Makarov; Gennady Strekalov
- Callsign: Mayak (Beacon)

Start of mission
- Launch date: 27 November 1980, 14:18:28 UTC
- Rocket: Soyuz-U
- Launch site: Baikonur 1/5

End of mission
- Landing date: 10 December 1980, 09:26:10 UTC
- Landing site: 130 kilometres (81 mi) from Dzhezkazgan

Orbital parameters
- Reference system: Geocentric
- Regime: Low Earth
- Perigee altitude: 200 kilometres (120 mi)
- Apogee altitude: 251 kilometres (156 mi)
- Inclination: 51.6 degrees
- Period: 88.7 minutes

Docking with Salyut 6
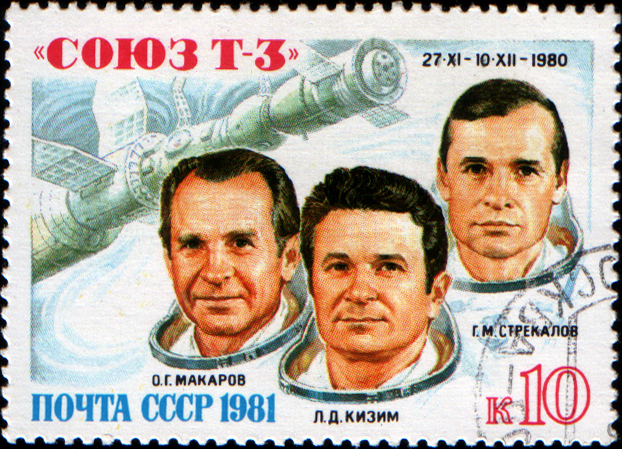
- 1981 USSR stamp, depicting Soyuz T-3 spacecraft and crew, from left to right: Oleg Makarov, Leonid Kizim, Gennady Strekalov Soyuz programme (Crewed missions)

Soyuz T-3 was a Soviet spaceflight, launched on 27 November 1980 to the Salyut 6 space station. It was the first Soyuz spacecraft to carry three cosmonauts following the fatal Soyuz 11 disaster in 1971.

The mission was both an early flight of the new Soyuz-T variant craft, as well as one of the later flights to the Salyut 6 station, which had successfully received several crews and visiting craft in recent years. Unlike previous habitations of the station, the crew of Soyuz T-3 did not receive any visitors, and thus did not exchange Soyuz craft with other crews for a return journey, a common practice.

== Crew ==
Position	Crew
Commander	Leonid Kizim; First spaceflight
Flight engineer	Oleg Makarov; Fourth and last spaceflight
Research cosmonaut	Gennady Strekalov; First spaceflight

=== Backup crew ===
Position	Crew
Commander	Vasili Lazarev
Flight engineer	Viktor Savinykh
Research cosmonaut	Valeri Polyakov

== Mission summary ==
Although the main objective of the crew's mission was to refurbish Salyut 6, part of their mission also involved testing their spacecraft. During their brief stay on Salyut 6, the crew performed experiments using the Splav and Kristall units, and studied biological material which had been carried aboard their Soyuz using the Svetoblok and Oazis units. Much of their time, however, was devoted to station maintenance.

On 2 December they began conducting the Mikroklimat experiment to assess the station's living conditions, and began work on the thermal control system. They installed a new hydraulic unit with four pumps. On 4 December, they replaced electronics in the station's telemetry system. 5 December saw them repairing electrical system faults. Other repairs included replacement of a program and timing device in the onboard control system and replacement of a power supply unit for the compressor in the refueling system. The Salyut 6 Principal Expedition 4 crew in TsUP provided the crew with advice as they made their repairs. On 8 December, Progress 11 carried out an orbital correction for the complex.

Upon leaving the station the craft's orbital module was left attached to Salyut 6 for a few hours, while its descent and service modules completed procedures for re-entry. This procedure was also used during the undocking of Soyuz T-4. Soyuz T-3 returned to Earth on 11 December 1980, landing 130 kilometres (81 mi) west of Dzhezkazgan, Kazakh SSR.

== See also ==
- List of human spaceflights to Salyut space stations
- List of Salyut expeditions
