= Soyuz 38 =

1980 Soviet human spaceflight mission to the Salyut 6 space station

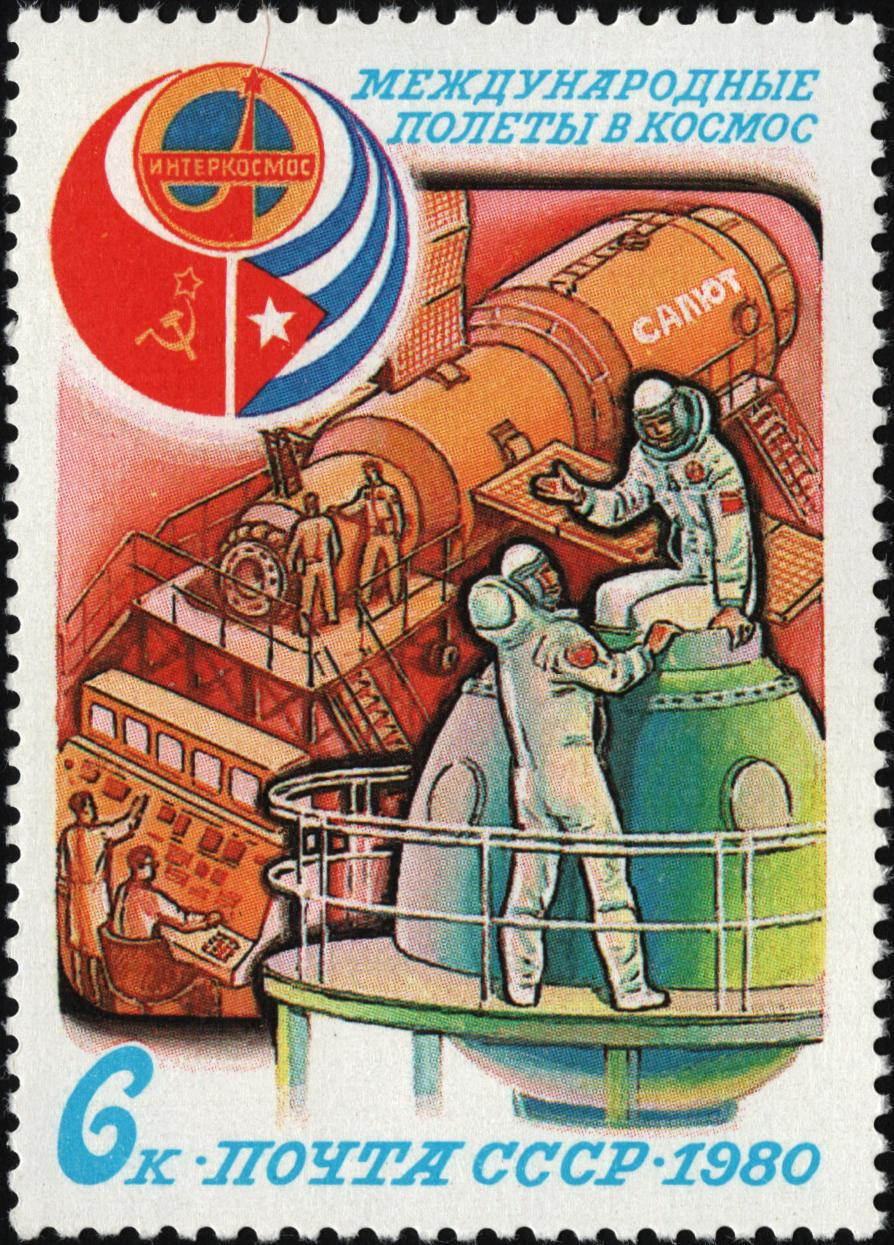
- Soviet postage stamp commemorating the Soyuz 38 mission
- COSPAR ID: 1980-075A
- SATCAT no.: 11977
- Mission duration: 7 days, 20 hours, 43 minutes, 24 seconds
- Orbits completed: 124

Spacecraft properties
- Spacecraft type: Soyuz 7K-T
- Manufacturer: NPO Energia
- Launch mass: 6,800 kilograms (15,000 lb)

Crew
- Crew size: 2
- Members: Yuri Romanenko; Arnaldo Tamayo Méndez
- Callsign: Taimyr

Start of mission
- Launch date: September 18, 1980, 19:11:03 UTC
- Rocket: Soyuz-U
- Launch site: Baikonur 1/5

End of mission
- Landing date: September 26, 1980, 15:54:27 UTC
- Landing site: 175 km SE of Dzhezkazgan

Orbital parameters
- Reference system: Geocentric
- Regime: Low Earth
- Perigee altitude: 199.7 kilometres (124.1 mi)
- Apogee altitude: 273.5 kilometres (169.9 mi)
- Inclination: 51.63 degrees
- Period: 88.194 minutes

Docking with Salyut 6
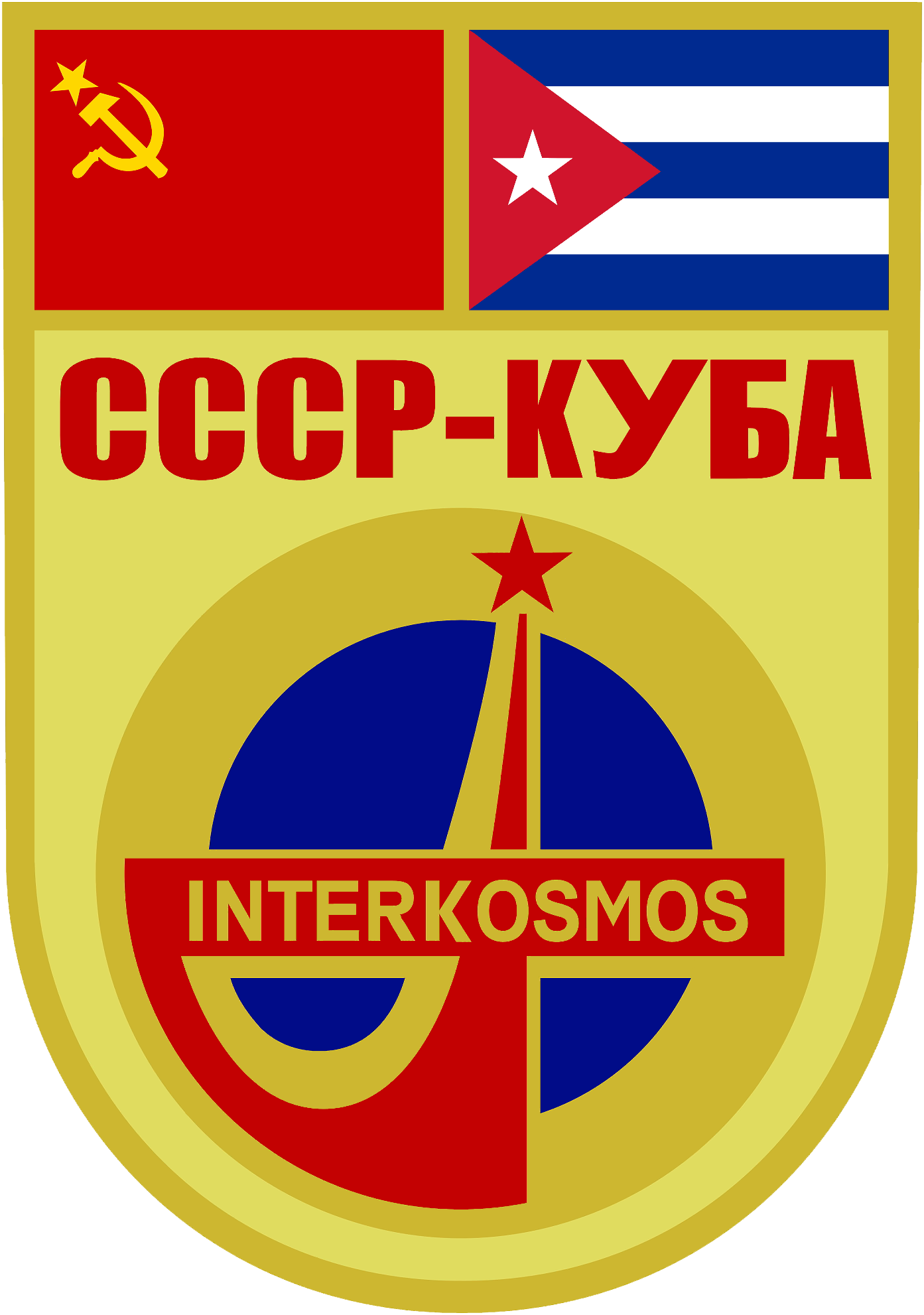
- Soyuz programme (Crewed missions)

Soyuz 38 was a human spaceflight mission conducted by the Soviet Union during September 1980. The Soyuz spacecraft brought two visiting crew members to the Salyut 6 space station, one of whom was an Intercosmos cosmonaut from Cuba.

== Crew ==
Prime crew
Position	Cosmonaut
Commander	Yuri Romanenko; Second spaceflight
Research cosmonaut	Arnaldo Tamayo Méndez, Interkosmos; Only spaceflight

Backup crew
Position	Cosmonaut
Commander	Yevgeni Khrunov
Research cosmonaut	José Armando López Falcón, Interkosmos

== Mission parameters ==
- Mass: 6800 kg
- Perigee: 199.7 km
- Apogee: 273.5 km
- Inclination: 51.63°
- Period: 88.194 minutes

== Mission highlights ==
12th expedition to Salyut 6. 7th international crew. Carried Intercosmos cosmonaut from Cuba. The Soyuz 38 docking occurred in darkness. As the spacecraft approached Salyut 6, the crew on the space station could see only its "headlights". Ryumin filmed ignition and operation of the transport's main engine. Arnaldo Tamayo Méndez of Cuba and Soviet cosmonaut Yuri Romanenko docked without incident.

The purpose of the Soyuz 38 mission was to carry out nine experiments. They stimulated different areas of the brain to further understand the electrical activity in our brain. This was done using a customized helmet for each cosmonaut with silver electrodes and a tape recorder. The cosmonauts also wore special shoes to study the structure and motion of feet changes during weightlessness. They also collaborated with the Cuban Institute of Endocrinology and Metabolic Diseases to examine blood and urine samples throughout the entire launch, stay, and return to explore the psychological stress from preparation and working long hours under constant weightlessness. Another experiment they conducted was centered around studying changes in the levels of skeletal muscle structure. They used a Cuban made instrument to assess the adipose tissue and the stimulation of body fat. There was also a study on blood circulation, which sought to determine the impact weightlessness has on the human circulatory system. Tests had been carried out in previous flights and were repeated during this mission using a Chibis suit, a below-the-waist reduced-pressure device. Crew members completed exercise protocols wearing the Chibis to provide gravity-simulating stress to the body's cardiovascular/circulatory system and re-establishing the body's orthostatic tolerance after extended periods of microgravity. Negative pressure on the legs causes blood to accumulate in the lower extremities, which is the case in a gravity environment. Orthostatic intolerance has been a frequent complaint in humans returning from long-duration space flights. The other experiments attempted to study how cell division, the immune system, concentrations of antibodies and other proteins and minerals were affected after prolonged exposure to a weightless environment. This included measurements into the amount and rate at which humans lost water, fat, and other minerals.The cosmonauts also studied the growth of a single crystal of sucrose in the same environment.

== See also ==
- List of human spaceflights to Salyut space stations
- List of Salyut expeditions
