= List of Salyut spacewalks =

This is a list of spacewalks conducted from the Salyut space stations. Salyut was a Soviet programme which consisted of a number of early space stations, including the first space station to be launched, Salyut 1. Six of the space stations launched as part of the Salyut programme were crewed, and spacewalks were made from two of these, Salyut 6 and Salyut 7. A total of sixteen spacewalks were made in the Salyut programme; three from Salyut 6 and thirteen from Salyut 7. Each involved two cosmonauts. Fifteen different cosmonauts performed the spacewalks, with several performing multiple EVAs. Leonid Kizim and Vladimir Solovyov each performed eight EVAs, the most of any cosmonauts in the programme.

All of the EVAs were conducted by cosmonauts who part of an Expedition crew, with the exception of one spacewalk by Visiting Expedition 4 cosmonauts Svetlana Savitskaya and Vladimir Dzhanibekov, on which Savitskaya became the first woman to perform an EVA. This is highlighted in light blue.

	Mission	Cosmonauts	Start time (GMT) Hatch opening	End time (GMT) Hatch closing	Duration
Salyut 6
1	EO-1	Yuri Romanenko; Georgi Grechko	19 December 1977; 21:36	19 December 1977; 23:04	1 hour, 28 minutes
1	EO-1	Inspected docking port following failed docking of Soyuz 25.			
2	EO-2	Vladimir Kovalyonok (stand up); Aleksandr Ivanchenkov	29 July 1978; 03:57	29 July 1978; 06:20	2 hours, 3 minutes
2	EO-2	Retrieved samples and experiments from the outside of the station.			
3	EO-3	Valery Ryumin; Vladimir Lyakhov	15 August 1979; 14:16	15 August 1979; 15:39	1 hour, 23 minutes
3	EO-3	Removed KRT-10 antenna that had failed to separate from the docking port, collected samples of damaged insulation and a micrometeoroid experiment.			
Salyut 7
1	EO-1	Anatoly Berezovoy (stand up); Valentin Lebedev	30 July 1982; 02:39	30 July 1982; 05:12	2 hours, 33 minutes
1	EO-1	Changed exposed experiments and tested construction techniques.			
2	EO-2; EVA 1	Vladimir Lyakhov; Aleksandr Aleksandrov	1 November 1983; 04:47	1 November 1983; 07:36	2 hours, 49 minutes
2	EO-2; EVA 1	Installed a new solar panel to increase the station's electrical output.			
3	EO-2; EVA 2	Vladimir Lyakhov; Aleksandr Aleksandrov	3 November 1983; 03:47	3 November 1983; 06:42	2 hours, 55 minutes
3	EO-2; EVA 2	Installed a second new solar panel, increasing electrical output by 50%			
4	EO-3; EVA 1	Leonid Kizim; Vladimir Solovyov	23 April 1984; 04:31	23 April 1984; 08:46	4 hours, 15 minutes
4	EO-3; EVA 1	Beginning of repairs on a ruptured oxidiser line, installed a ladder to enable access to the damaged area.			
5	EO-3; EVA 2	Leonid Kizim; Vladimir Solovyov	26 April 1984; 02:40	26 April 1984; 07:40	5 hours
5	EO-3; EVA 2	Removed insulation around the ruptured oxidiser line and installed a valve in the replacement line			
6	EO-3; EVA 3	Leonid Kizim; Vladimir Solovyov	29 April 1984; 01:35	29 April 1984; 04:20	2 hours, 45 minutes
6	EO-3; EVA 3	Installed a new oxidiser line to bypass the damaged section of the main line.			
7	EO-3; EVA 4	Leonid Kizim; Vladimir Solovyov	3 May 1984; 23:15	4 May 1984; 02:00	2 hours, 45 minutes
7	EO-3; EVA 4	Installed a second bypass oxidiser line and replaced the insulation removed in the second EVA.			
8	EO-3; EVA 5	Leonid Kizim; Vladimir Solovyov	18 May 1984; 17:52	18 May 1984; 20:57	3 hours, 5 minutes
8	EO-3; EVA 5	Installed two more solar panels on the station.			
9	EP-4	Vladimir Dzhanibekov; Svetlana Savitskaya	25 July 1984; 14:55	25 July 1984; 18:29	3 hours, 34 minutes
9	EP-4	Tested tools and materials, Savitskaya became first woman to perform an EVA.			
10	EO-3; EVA 6	Leonid Kizim; Vladimir Solovyov	8 August 1984; 08:46	8 August 1984; 13:46	5 hours
10	EO-3; EVA 6	Completed repairs on the damaged oxidiser line.			
11	EO-4	Vladimir Dzhanibekov; Viktor Savinykh	2 August 1985; 07:15	2 August 1985; 12:15	5 hours
11	EO-4	Installed two further solar panels to provide additional power to the space station.			
12	EO-6; EVA 1	Leonid Kizim; Vladimir Solovyov	28 May 1986; 05:43	28 May 1986; 09:33	3 hours, 50 minutes
12	EO-6; EVA 1	Retrieved experiments and tested construction techniques for the Mir programme.			
13	EO-6; EVA 2	Leonid Kizim; Vladimir Solovyov	31 May 1986; 04:57	31 May 1986; 09:57	5 hours
13	EO-6; EVA 2	Conducted further tests of construction techniques for use in the assembly of Mir.			

== See also ==
- Extra-vehicular activity
- List of spacewalks and moonwalks
- List of cumulative spacewalk records
- Salyut programme
- List of human spaceflights to Salyut space stations
- List of Salyut expeditions
- List of Salyut visitors
- List of uncrewed spaceflights to Salyut space stations
- List of Mir spacewalks
- List of International Space Station spacewalks
