= Boris Andreyev =

Boris Andreyev may refer to:

- Boris Andreyev (cosmonaut) (1940–2021), Soviet cosmonaut
- Boris Andreyev (actor) (1915–1982), Soviet actor
- Boris Andreyev (shooter) (1906–1987), Soviet Olympic shooter
