= Jügderdemidiin Gürragchaa =

Mongolian cosmonaut and defense minister (born 1947)

- Жүгдэрдэмидийн Гүррагчаа
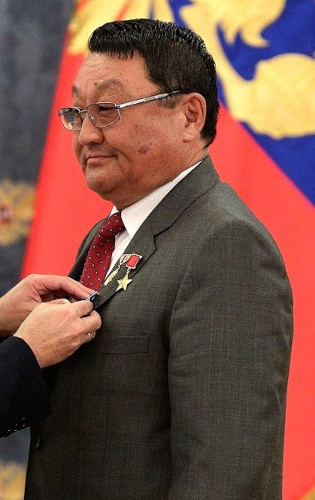
- Gürragchaa in 2011

Minister of Defence of Mongolia
- In office 2000–2004
- President: Natsagiin Bagabandi
- Prime Minister: Nambaryn Enkhbayar

Member of State Great Khural
- In office 2004–2008
- President: Natsagiin Bagabandi; Nambaryn Enkhbayar
- Prime Minister: Tsakhiagiin Elbegdorj; Miyeegombiin Enkhbold; Sanjaagiin Bayar

Personal details
- Born: 15 December 1947 (age 78) Gurvanbulag, Bulgan, Mongolia
- Education: Zhukov Air Force Academy
- Profession: Aerospace Engineer/Flight engineer
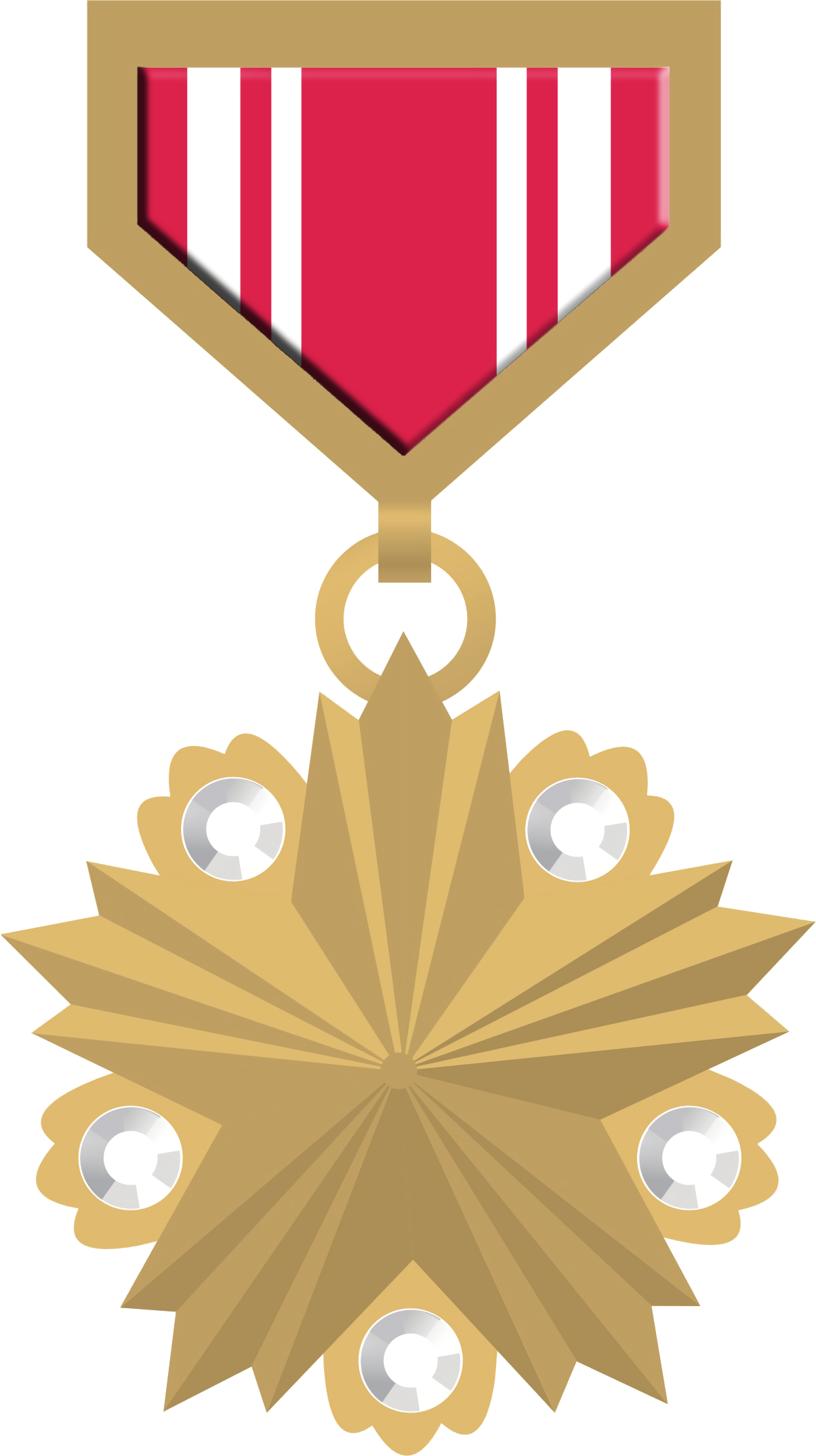
- Awards

Military service
- Allegiance: Mongolia
- Branch/service: Mongolian Air Force
- Years of service: 1966–?
- Rank: Major General
- Space career

Intercosmos Cosmonaut
- Time in space: 7d 20h 42m
- Selection: 1978 Intercosmos Group
- Missions: Soyuz 39

Jügderdemidiin Gürragchaa (Note: Mongolian: Жүгдэрдэмидийн Гүррагчаа, IPA: [tɕuktɪrtɪmʲtíɴ kuraktɕʰá]; Russian: Жугдэрдэмидийн Гуррагча, romanized: Zhugdėrdėmidíyn Gurragchá, IPA: [ˌʐuɡdɨrdɨmʲɪˈdʲijn ɡʊrɐkˈtɕa]) (born 5 December 1947) is a Mongolian cosmonaut and military leader. He was the first Mongol and second Asian to go into space. He also was Mongolia's Defense Minister from 2000 to 2004.

== Early life and spaceflight ==
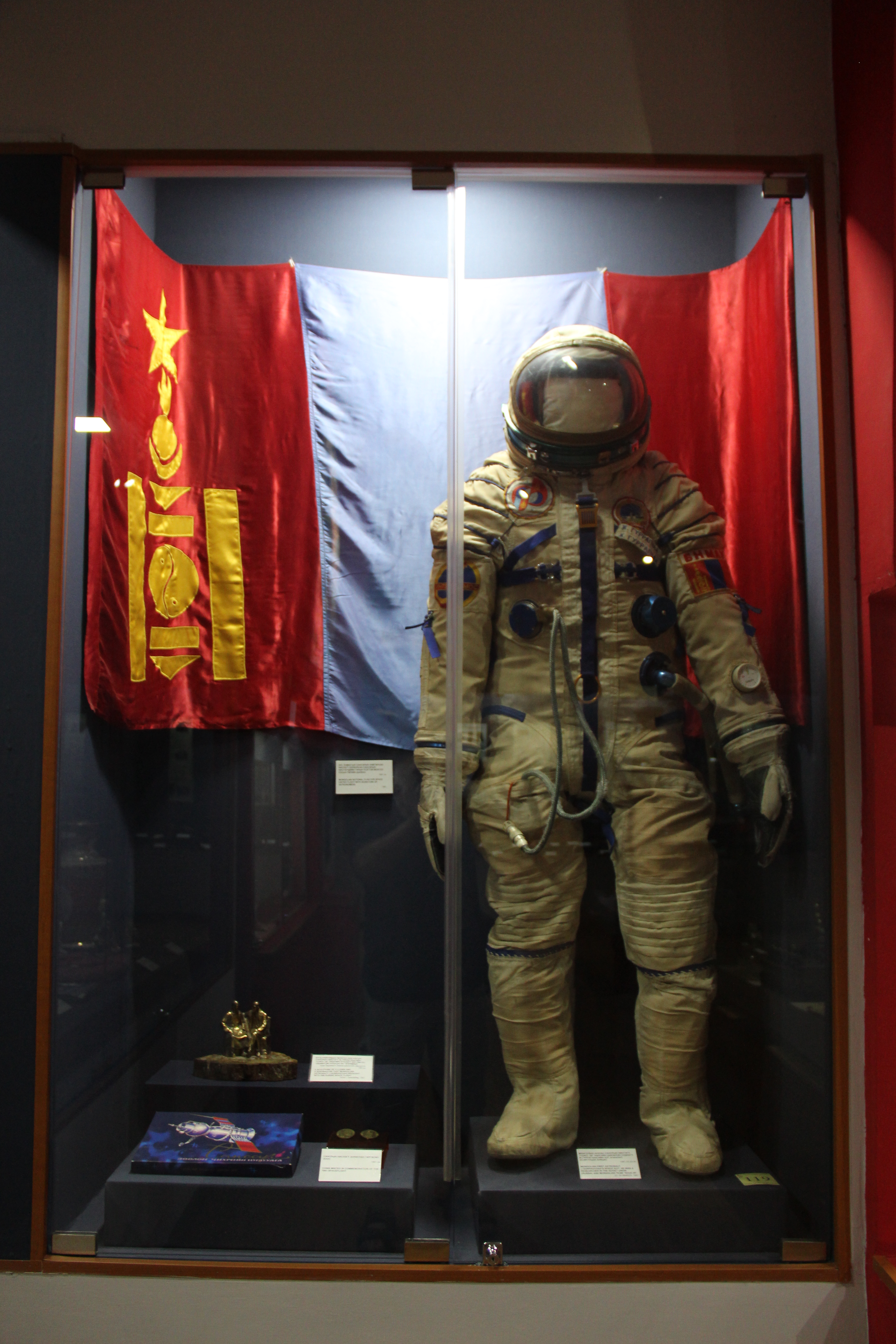
Mongolia's first astronaut suit, National Museum of Mongolia

Born in Gurvanbulag, Bulgan, Gürragchaa studied in Ulaanbaatar to become an aerospace engineer. In 1966, he joined the Mongolian Air Force. He graduated from the Zhukovsky Air Force Engineering Academy in 1978.

He was selected as part of the eighth Intercosmos program on 1 March 1978, at time he was in the rank of Major General. His backup was Maidarjavyn Ganzorig. Gürragchaa, along with Soviet cosmonaut Vladimir Dzhanibekov, departed from Baikonur Cosmodrome on 22 March 1981 on Soyuz 39. They docked with Salyut 6.

While in orbit, Dzhanibekov and Gürragchaa carried out experiments on Earth science. After 124 orbits and 7 days, 20 hours and 42 minutes in space, Gürragchaa and Dzhanibekov landed 170 km southeast of Dzhezkasgan.

== Post-flight career ==
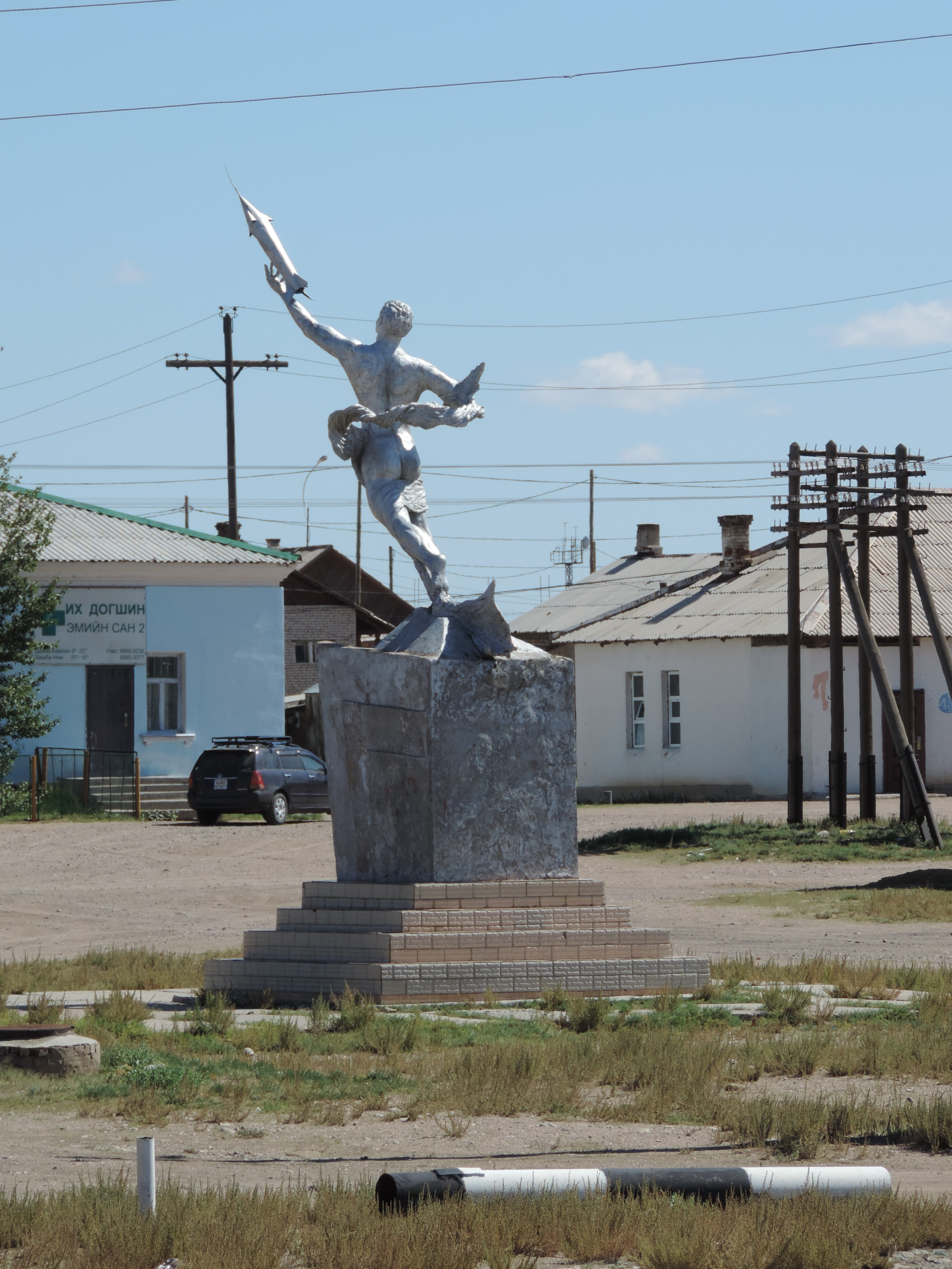
A sculpture commemorating Gürragchaa, in Choir

The Zaisan Memorial, a monument south of Ulaanbaatar dedicated to Russian–Mongolian friendship, includes a mural which depicts amongst its scenes Gürragchaa's 1981 flight.

Gürragchaa worked as the chief of staff of air defense for the Mongolian Armed Forces, served as the Defense Minister of Mongolia from 2000 to 2004 and was a member of State Great Khural from 2004 to 2008.

== Personal life ==
Gürragchaa is married and has two children. He heads the fund for development of bandy in Mongolia. Aside from Mongolian, Gürragchaa is fluent in Russian due to his time in Russia.

== Awards ==
- Hero of the Soviet Union (30 March 1981)
- (Soviet Union) Order of Lenin
- Hero of the Mongolian People's Republic (1981)
- (Mongolian People's Republic) Order of Sukhbaatar (1981)
- (Mongolia) Order of Genghis Khan (2021)
- (Russia) Order of Alexander Nevsky (2021)
- (Russia) Order of Honour (2011)
- (Russia) Order of Friendship (2001)
- (Russia) Medal "For Merit in Space Exploration" (2011)
