= Soyuz 39 =

1981 crewed flight of the Soyuz program

- COSPAR ID: 1981-029A
- SATCAT no.: 12366
- Mission duration: 7 days, 20 hours, 42 minutes, 3 seconds
- Orbits completed: 124

Spacecraft properties
- Spacecraft type: Soyuz 7K-T
- Manufacturer: NPO Energia
- Launch mass: 6,800 kilograms (15,000 lb)

Crew
- Crew size: 2
- Members: Vladimir Dzhanibekov; Jügderdemidiin Gürragchaa
- Callsign: Pamir (Pamirs)

Start of mission
- Launch date: 22 March 1981, 14:58:55 UTC
- Rocket: Soyuz-U
- Launch site: Baikonur 1/5

End of mission
- Landing date: 30 March 1981, 11:40:58 UTC
- Landing site: 175 km SE of Dzhezkazgan

Orbital parameters
- Reference system: Geocentric
- Regime: Low Earth
- Perigee altitude: 197.5 kilometres (122.7 mi)
- Apogee altitude: 282.8 kilometres (175.7 mi)
- Inclination: 51.6 degrees
- Period: 89.1 minutes

Docking with Salyut 6
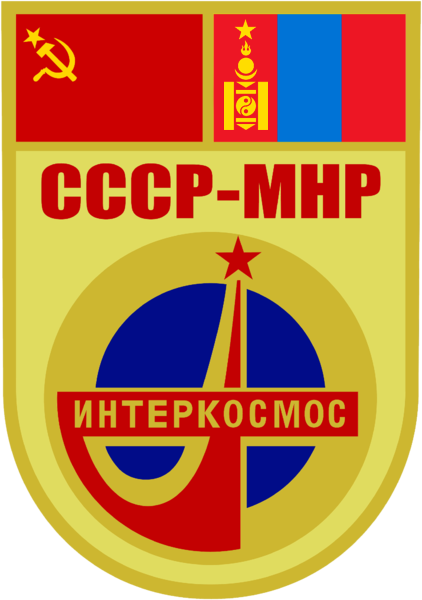
- Soyuz programme (Crewed missions)

Soyuz 39 was a 1981 Soviet crewed space flight to the Salyut 6 space station. It was the fifteenth expedition, and carried the eighth international crew to the orbiting facility. The crew visited Vladimir Kovalyonok and Viktor Savinykh, who had reached Salyut-6 ten days prior.

The flight carried Vladimir Dzhanibekov and Jügderdemidiin Gürragchaa into space. With this mission, Gürragchaa became the first Mongolian, and second Asian cosmonaut.

The Mongolian contribution for this mission had begun in 1967, when the president of the Mongolian Academy of Sciences Bazaryn Shirendev attended a conference of scientists from socialist countries in Moscow, where the Intercosmos project was announced. Dzhanibekov and Gürragchaa performed about thirty experiments during the course of the mission.

== Crew ==
Prime crew
Position	Cosmonaut
Commander	Vladimir Dzhanibekov; Second spaceflight
Research cosmonaut	Jügderdemidiin Gürragchaa, Interkosmos; Only spaceflight

Backup crew
Position	Cosmonaut
Commander	Vladimir Lyakhov
Research cosmonaut	Maidarjavyn Ganzorig, Interkosmos

== Mission parameters ==
- Mass: 6800 kg
- Perigee: 197.5 km
- Apogee: 282.8 km
- Inclination: 51.6°
- Period: 89.01 minutes

== Mission highlights ==
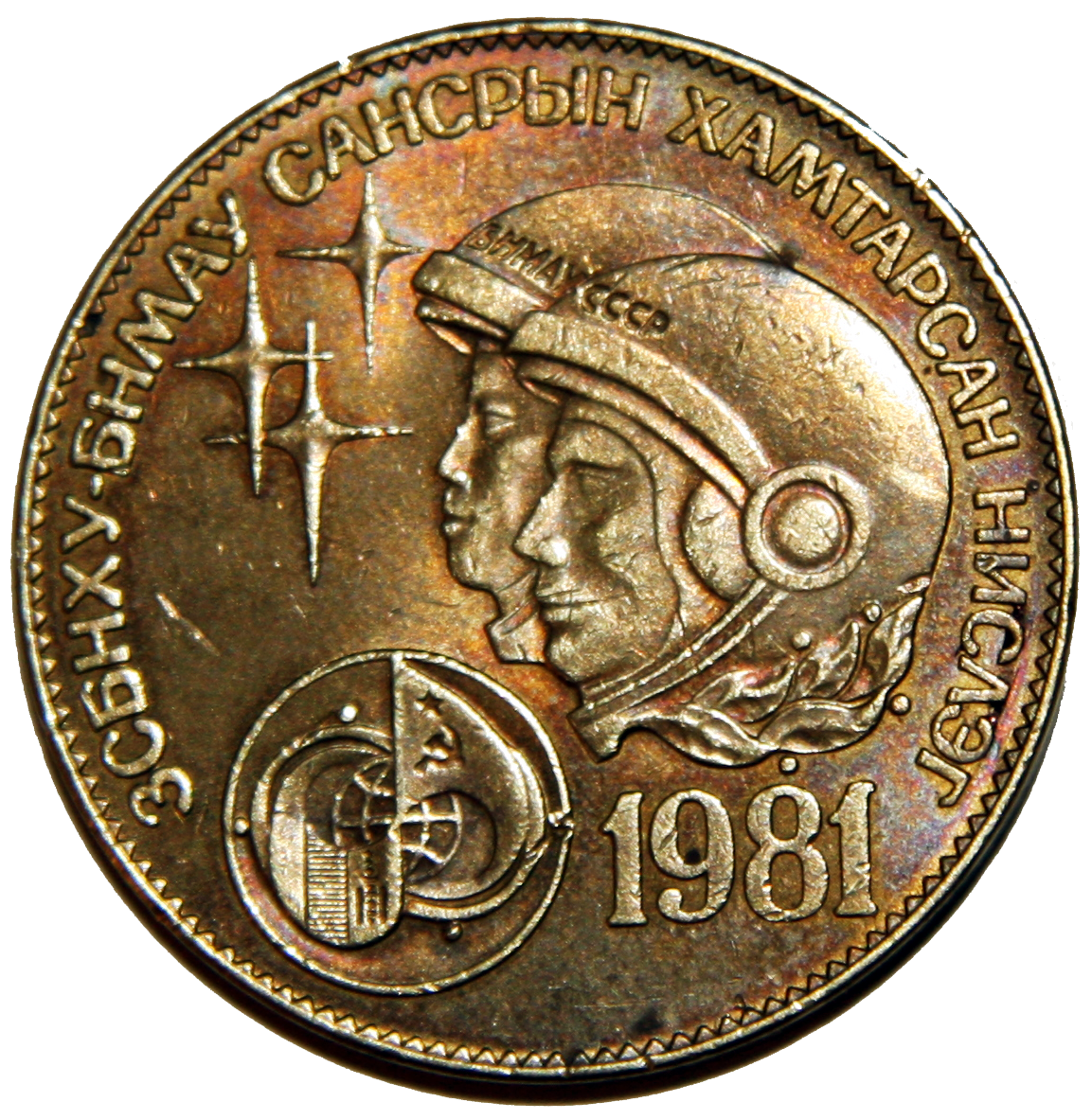
Mongolian coin commemorating the spaceflight

Soyuz 39 docked with the first Mongolian cosmonaut aboard. The resident EO-6 crew assisted the Intercosmos crew with station equipment and oriented the station according to the needs of the visiting crew's experiments.

On 24 March, the cosmonauts installed cosmic ray detectors in the station's work and transfer compartments. On 26 March the cosmonauts performed the Illuminator ("viewing port") experiment, which studied the degradation of the station's viewports. On 27 March, Vladimir Kovalyonok and Viktor Savinykh of the resident crew used the Gologramma ("hologram") apparatus to image a viewing port damaged by micrometeoroids. They repeated this experiment the next day, when they also collected samples of the station's air and microflora and removed the cosmic ray detectors for return to Earth. 28–29 March were largely devoted to studies of Mongolia from space. The visiting crew also checked out their spacecraft on 29 March

The Soviet news service TASS noted that by 29 March, Salyut 6 had conducted 20,140 revolutions of Earth.

== See also ==
- List of human spaceflights to Salyut space stations
- List of Salyut expeditions
