= Maidarjavyn Ganzorig =

Mongolian cosmonaut (1949–2021)

Maidarjavyn Ganzorig Майдаржавын Ганзориг
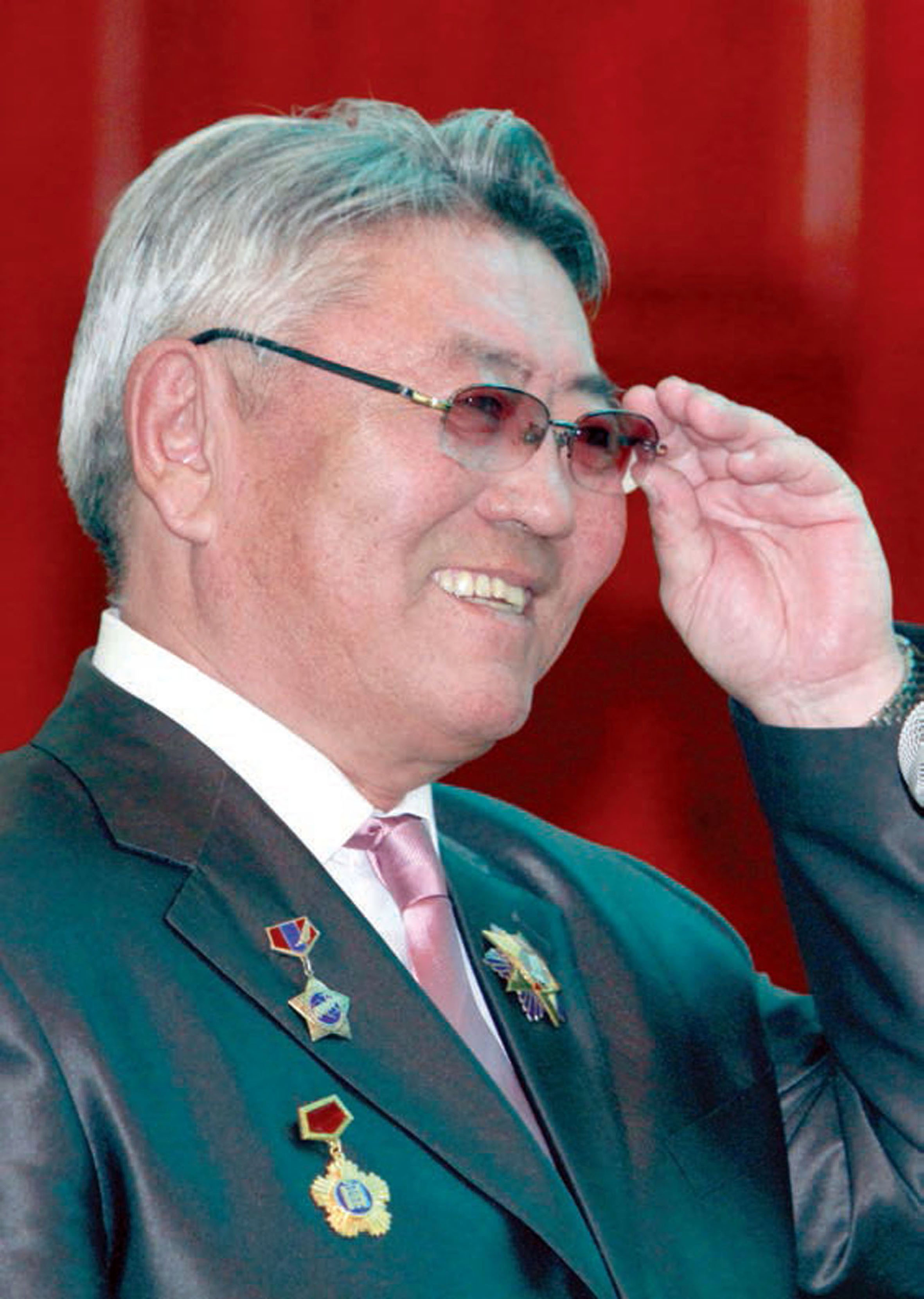
- Born: 5 February 1949; Tsetserleg, Mongolia
- Died: 4 July 2021 (aged 72); Ulaanbaatar, Mongolia
- Occupation: Flight engineer
- Space career

Intercosmos Cosmonaut
- Rank: Major General
- Time in space: none
- Selection: 1978 Intercosmos Group
- Missions: Soyuz 39 (backup crew)

Maidarjavyn Ganzorig (Mongolian: Майдаржавын Ганзориг; 5 February 1949 – 4 July 2021) was a Mongolian cosmonaut and academic.

In 1978, he participated in the Soviet Intercosmos program and trained for the Soyuz 39 mission.

== Biography ==
Ganzorig was born in Tsetserleg, Arkhangai in 1949, finishing his secondary education in 1968. He studied at Kyiv Polytechnic Institute, earning a degree in heating and precision automated devices maintenance, graduating in 1975. In 1978, he was selected as the backup to Jügderdemidiin Gürragchaa for the Soyuz 39 mission, who would become the first Mongolian in space.

In 1984, he received a Candidate of Technical Sciences degree.

From 1984 to 1991 Ganzorig was Head of the RS Laboratory at the Institute of Physics and Technology, Mongolian Academy of Sciences, and since 1991 served as the Director of Informatics at the Remote Sensing Center, Mongolian Academy of Sciences, Ulaanbaatar.
