= Arnaldo Tamayo Méndez =

Cuban cosmonaut (born 1942)

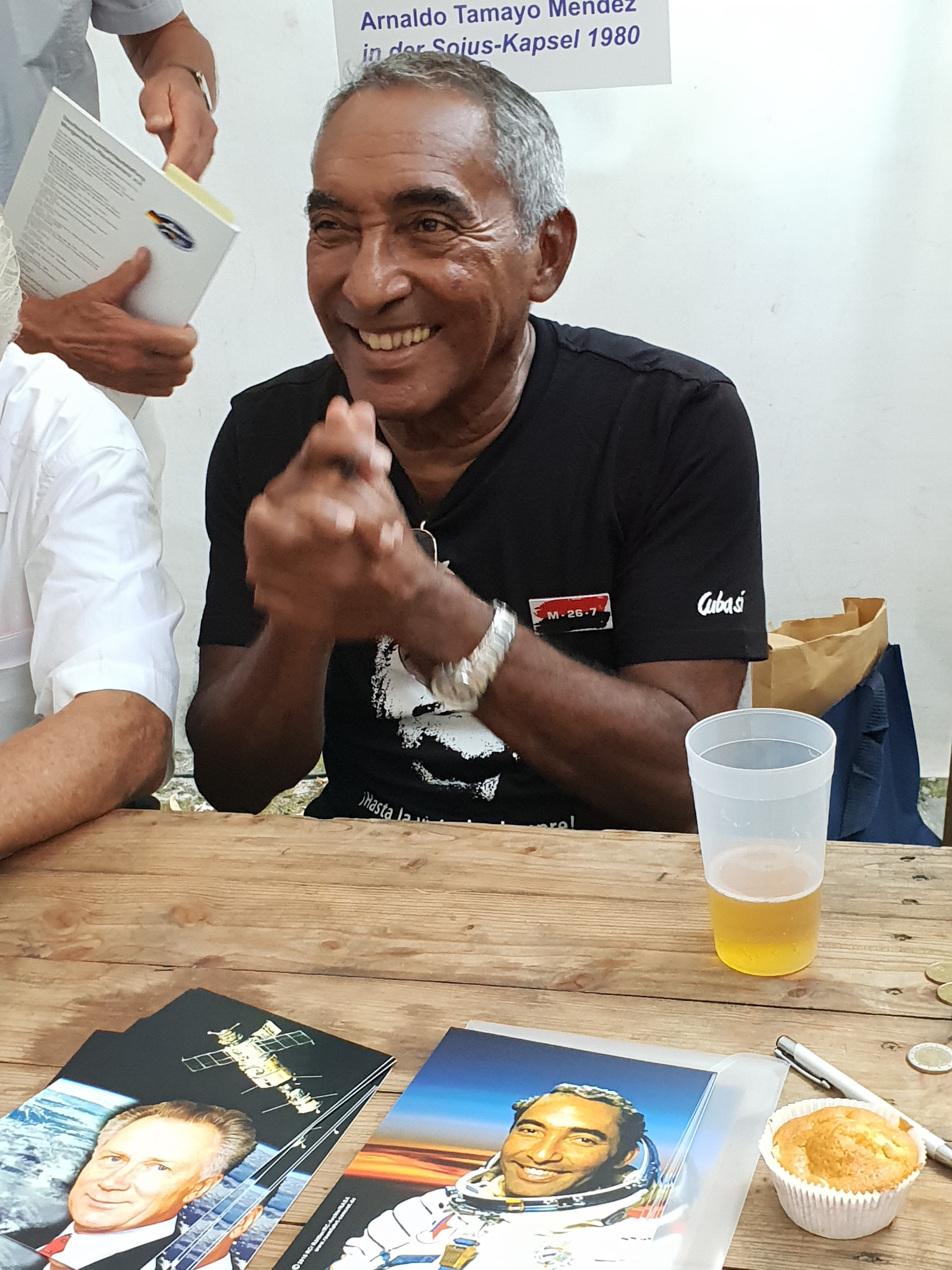
- Méndez in 2018
- Born: 29 January 1942 (age 84); Baracoa, Cuba
- Occupation: Pilot
- Awards: Hero of the Republic of Cuba; Hero of the Soviet Union
- Space career

Intercosmos Research Cosmonaut
- Status: Retired
- Rank: Brigadier General
- Time in space: 7d 20h 43m
- Selection: 1978 Intercosmos Group
- Missions: Soyuz 38
- Military career
- Allegiance: Cuba
- Branch: Cuban Revolutionary Air and Air Defense Force
- Service years: 1960-1992
- Rank: General de brigada (Brigadier general)
- Commands: Santa Clara Aviation Brigade; Department of International Affairs; Cuba's civil defense organization
- Conflicts: Cuban Missile Crisis; Vietnam War

Arnaldo Tamayo Méndez (born 29 January 1942) is a Cuban military officer, legislator, and former cosmonaut. In 1980, as a member of the crew of Soyuz 38, he became the first Cuban citizen, the first Latin American, the first person of African descent, and the first person from a country in the Western Hemisphere other than the United States to travel into Earth orbit.

== Early life and military service ==
Tamayo was born on 29 January 1942, in Baracoa, Guantánamo province, into a family of Afro-Cuban descent. Orphaned as an infant, he was adopted at age 1 by Rafael Tamayo and Esperanza Méndez. He began working at age 13 as a shoeshine and vegetable vendor and later worked as a carpenter's assistant.

During the Cuban Revolution he joined the Association of Young Rebels, a group protesting the Batista regime, and later the Revolutionary Work Youth Brigades. After the Cuban Revolution, he entered the Technical Institute "Rebel Army", completing a course for aviation technicians in December 1960. Wishing to become a fighter pilot, he went on to join the Cuban Revolutionary Armed Forces. Between April 1961 and May 1962, Tamayo completed a course in aerial combat with MiG-15s at the Yeysk Higher Air Force School in the Soviet Union, after which he was certified a combat pilot at the age of 19. Later that year, during the Cuban Missile Crisis, he flew 20 reconnaissance missions as part of the Playa Girón Brigade of the Cuban Revolutionary Air and Air Defense Force.

In 1967, Tamayo joined the Communist Party of Cuba and spent the next two years serving with Cuban forces in the Vietnam War, returning in 1969 to study at the Maximo Gomez Basic College of the Revolutionary Forces until 1971.

In 1975, he was made Chief of Staff of the Santa Clara Aviation Brigade and was promoted to the rank of lieutenant colonel the following year. In 1978 he was selected to join the Intercosmos program and moved to Star City, Russia for his training as a cosmonaut.

== Intercosmos program ==
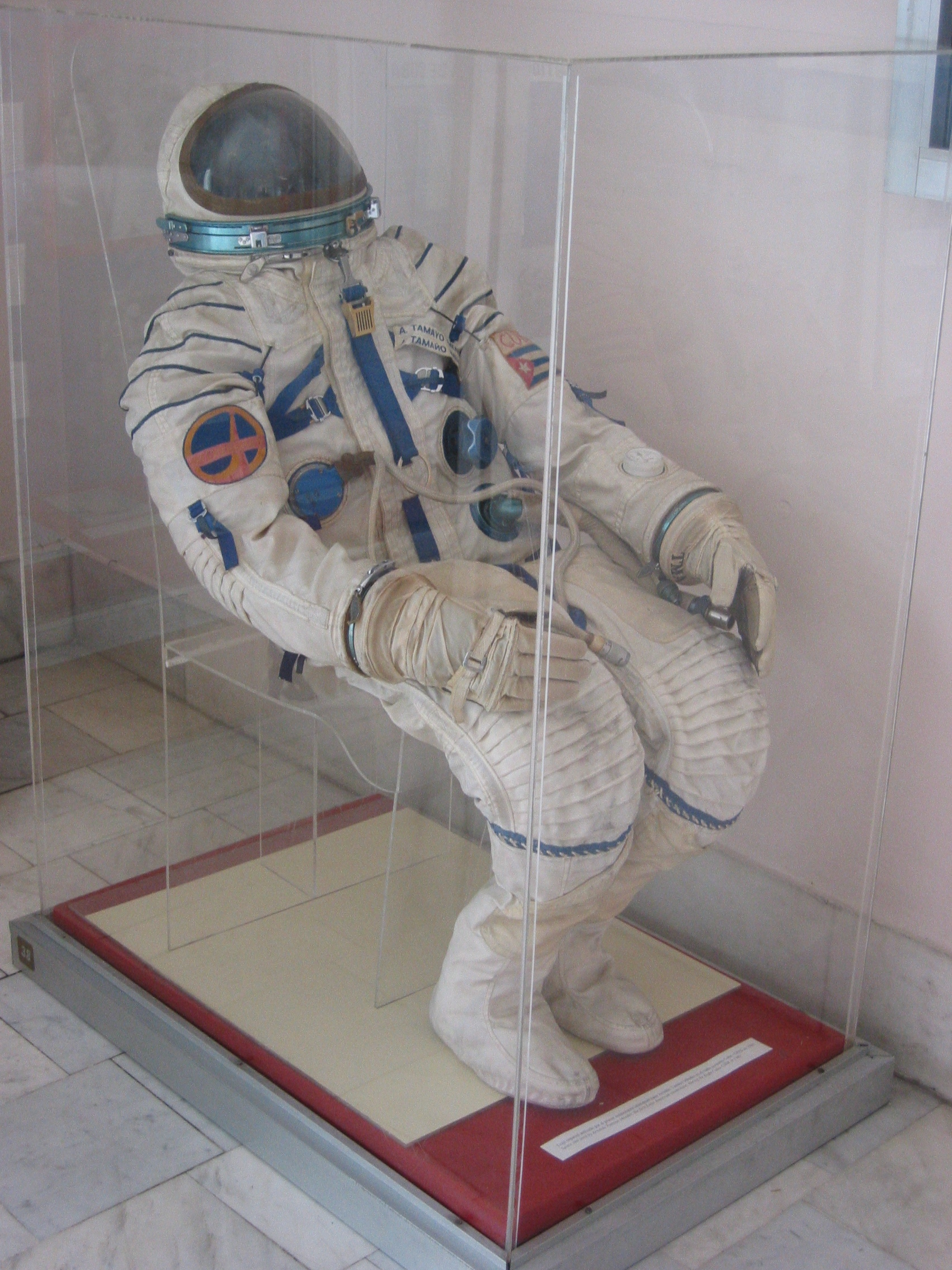
Arnaldo Tamayo's Sokol space suit, on display at Museo de la Revolución, Havana, Cuba, 2002

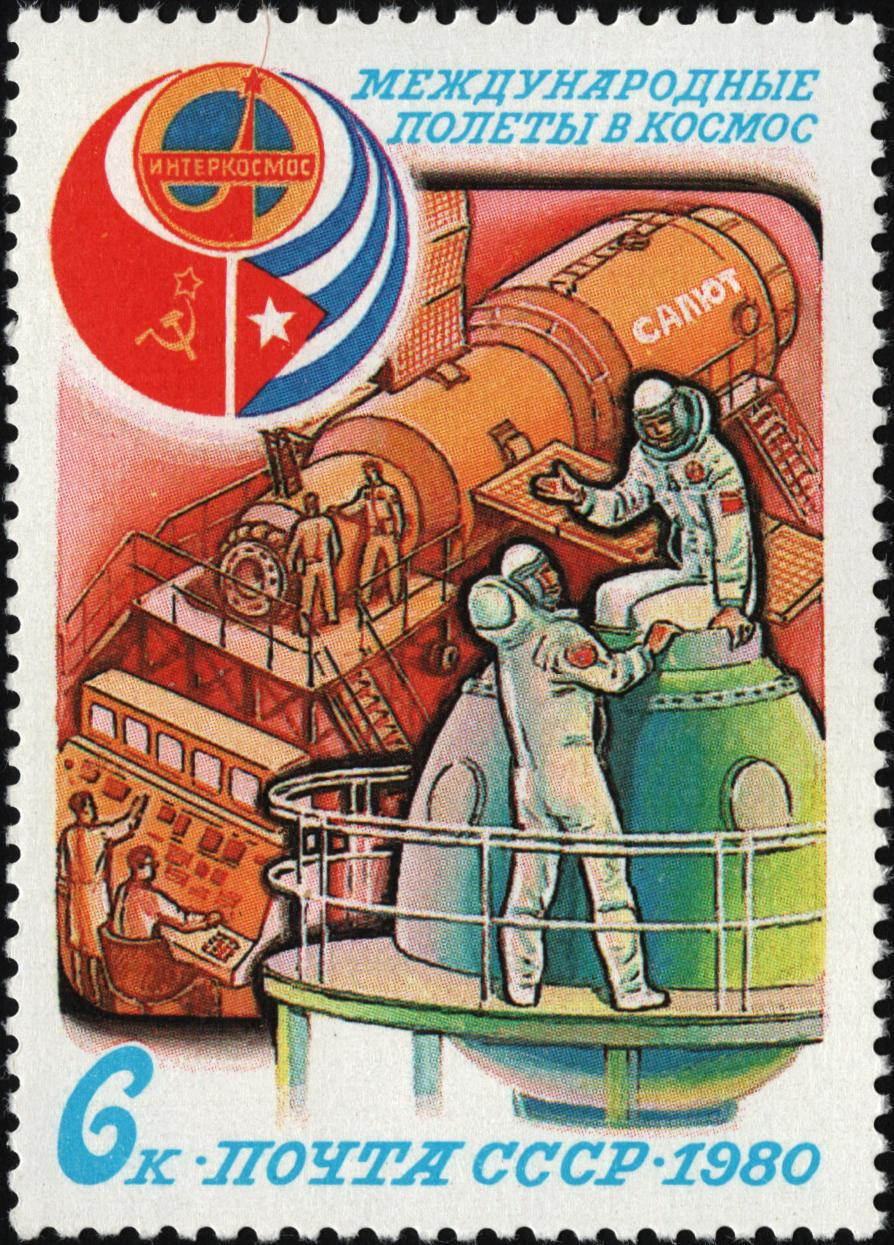
Soviet postage stamp commemorating the Soyuz 38 mission.

Tamayo was selected as part of the Soviet Union's seventh Intercosmos program on 1 March 1978. His backup in the Intercosmos program was fellow Cuban José López Falcón. Tamayo would spend the next two and a half years in training for the mission.

Tamayo, along with Soviet cosmonaut Yuri Romanenko, was launched into space aboard Soyuz 38 from Baikonur Cosmodrome on 18 September 1980, at 19:11 UTC. After docking with Salyut 6, Tamayo and Romanenko conducted experiments in an attempt to find what caused space adaptation syndrome (SAS), and perhaps even find a cure, and on the crystallisation of sucrose in microgravity, for the benefit of Cuba's sugar industry. The SAS experiment involved wearing special adjustable shoes that placed a load on the arch of the foot for six hours a day. After 124 orbits of the Earth (lasting 7 days, 20 hours and 43 minutes), Tamayo and Romanenko landed 180 km (110 mi) from Dzhezkazgan. The landing was risky, as it was at night.

Upon his return to Earth he was decorated with the Hero of the Republic of Cuba medal, the first person to be so honored. In Moscow he received the Order of Lenin and was also named a Hero of the Soviet Union.

== Personal life ==
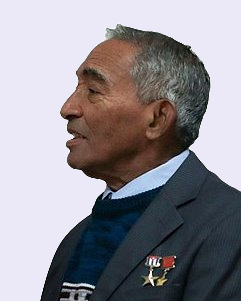
Méndez in 2022

Following his time in the Intercosmos program, Tamayo was made Director of the Military Patriotic Educational Society known as Sociedad de Educación Patriótico-Militar "SEPMI". After his promotion to brigadier general, he became Director of International Affairs in the Cuban Revolutionary Armed Forces.

Since 1980, he has been a Deputy in the Cuban National Assembly, representing his home region of Guantánamo Province.

He has been honored by the Cuban Government for being the first Cuban, the first Caribbean, and the first Latin American to go into orbit. He was also awarded the title of Hero of the Republic of Cuba and the Order of Playa Girón. He was also a recipient of the Hero of the Soviet Union award.

Tamayo is married and has two daughters and a son.

His space suit is preserved at the Museum of the Revolution in Havana.

== See also ==
- List of Afro-Latinos
- List of African-American astronauts
- List of Hispanic astronauts
