= International participation in the Vietnam War =

Aspect of the Vietnam War

The Vietnam War involved many countries across the world. North Vietnam received support from the Eastern Bloc, while South Vietnam was supported by nations of the Western Bloc.

== Pro-North Vietnam ==
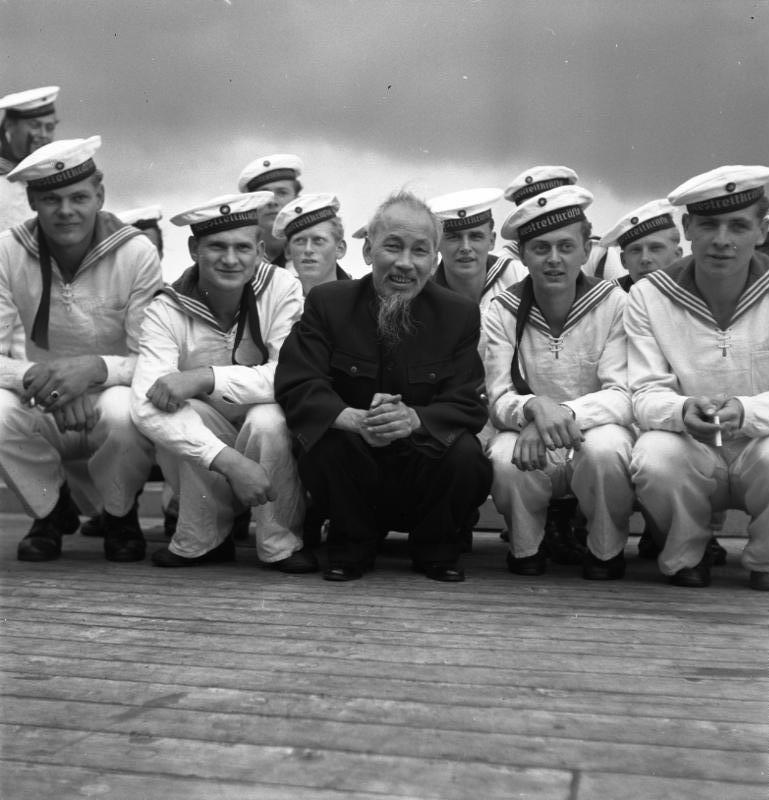
Ho Chi Minh with East German sailors in Stralsund harbour, 1957

=== China ===
In 1950, the People's Republic of China extended diplomatic recognition to the Democratic Republic of Vietnam led by the communist Viet Minh and sent heavy weapons, as well as military advisers led by Luo Guibo to assist the Viet Minh in its war with the French. The first draft of the 1954 Geneva Accords was negotiated by French prime minister Pierre Mendès France and Chinese Premier Zhou Enlai who, seeing U.S. intervention coming, urged the Viet Minh to accept a partition at the 17th parallel.

According to US diplomat, Richard Holbrooke, ongoing Sino-Soviet tensions Chinese and Russian mutual suspicions were suspended when they united against US forces in Vietnam.

China's support for North Vietnam included both financial aid initially, and later included the deployment of hundreds of thousands of military personnel in support roles. In the summer of 1962, Mao Zedong agreed to supply Hanoi with 90,000 rifles and guns free of charge. Starting in 1965, China sent anti-aircraft units and engineering battalions to North Vietnam to repair the damage caused by American bombing, man anti-aircraft batteries, rebuild roads and railroads, transport supplies, and perform other engineering works. Chinese logistic support freed North Vietnamese army units for combat in the South. China sent 320,000 troops and annual arms shipments worth $180 million. The Chinese military claims to have caused 38% of American air losses in the war.

Sino-Soviet relations soured after the Soviets invaded Czechoslovakia in August 1968. In October, the Chinese demanded North Vietnam cut relations with Moscow, but Hanoi had refused. The Chinese began to withdraw some units in November 1968 in preparation for a clash with the Soviets, which occurred at Zhenbao Island in March 1969.

In 1967, the Chinese government launched a secret military program named "Project 523". which sought to develop an antimalarial medication due to widespread malaria among PAVN forces and Chinese scientist Tu Youyou and her collaborators discovered artemisinin. Tu was awarded the Nobel Prize in 2015 for her contribution on the anti-malaria treatment.

The PRC also began financing the Khmer Rouge as a counterweight to North Vietnam during the Cambodian Civil War. China "armed and trained" the Khmer Rouge during the civil war and continued to aid them for years afterward. The Khmer Rouge launched raids into Vietnam in 1975–1978. When Vietnam responded with an invasion that toppled the Khmer Rouge, China launched a brief, punitive invasion of Vietnam in 1979.

=== Soviet Union ===
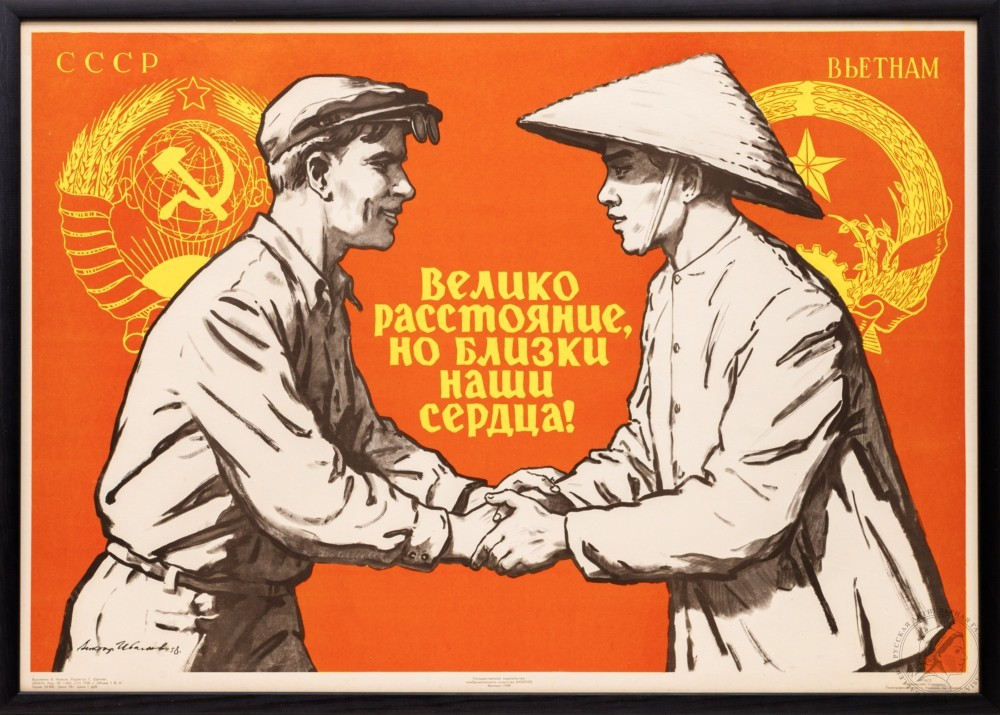
"The distances are great, but our hearts are close." Soviet-Vietnamese friendship poster from early 60s

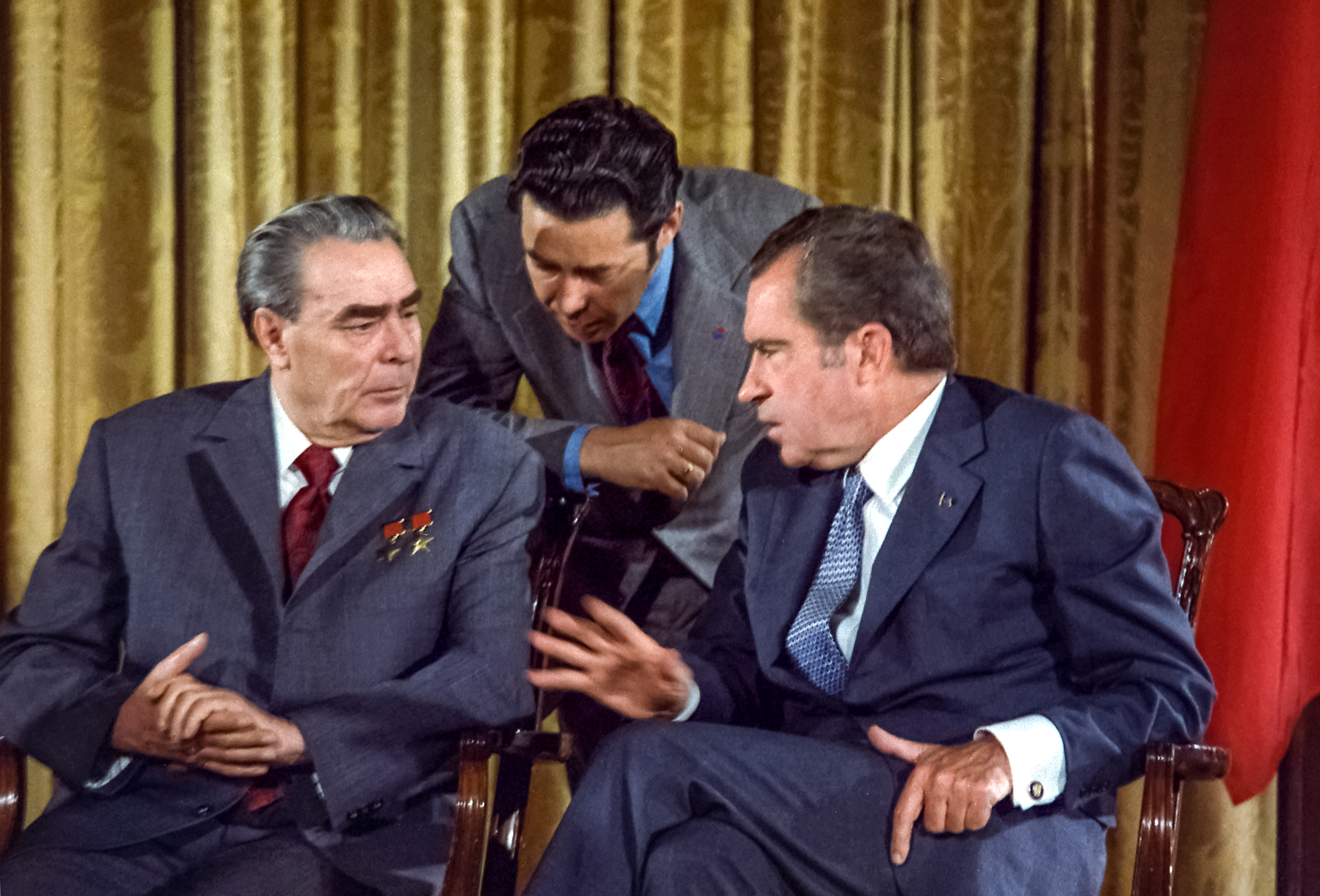
Leonid Brezhnev (left) was the Soviet Union's leader during the Vietnam War.

The Soviet Union provided military assistance by assisting and training North Vietnamese air force personnel. Soviet pilots sometimes flew the planes their government supplied.

Soviet ships in the South China Sea gave early warning intel to PAVN/VC forces in South Vietnam. The Soviet intelligence ships would pick up American B-52 bombers flying from Okinawa and Guam. Their airspeed and direction would be recorded and relayed to the Central Office for South Vietnam, which was the PAVN/VC's southern headquarters. Using airspeed and direction, COSVN analysts calculated bombing targets and directed assets to move "perpendicularly to the attack trajectory." These advance warnings gave military units time to move out of the way of the bombers, and, while the bombing runs caused extensive damage, because of the early warnings from 1968 to 1970 they did not kill a single military or civilian leader in the headquarters complexes.

The Soviet Union also helped North Vietnam develop anti-US propaganda posters.

The Soviet Union supplied North Vietnam with medical supplies, arms, tanks, planes, helicopters, artillery, anti-aircraft missiles and other military equipment. Soviet crews fired Soviet-made surface-to-air missiles at U.S. F-4 Phantoms, which were shot down over Thanh Hóa in 1965. Over a dozen Soviet soldiers lost their lives in this conflict. Following the dissolution of the Soviet Union in 1991, Russian Federation officials acknowledged that the Soviet Union had stationed up to 3,000 troops in Vietnam during the war.

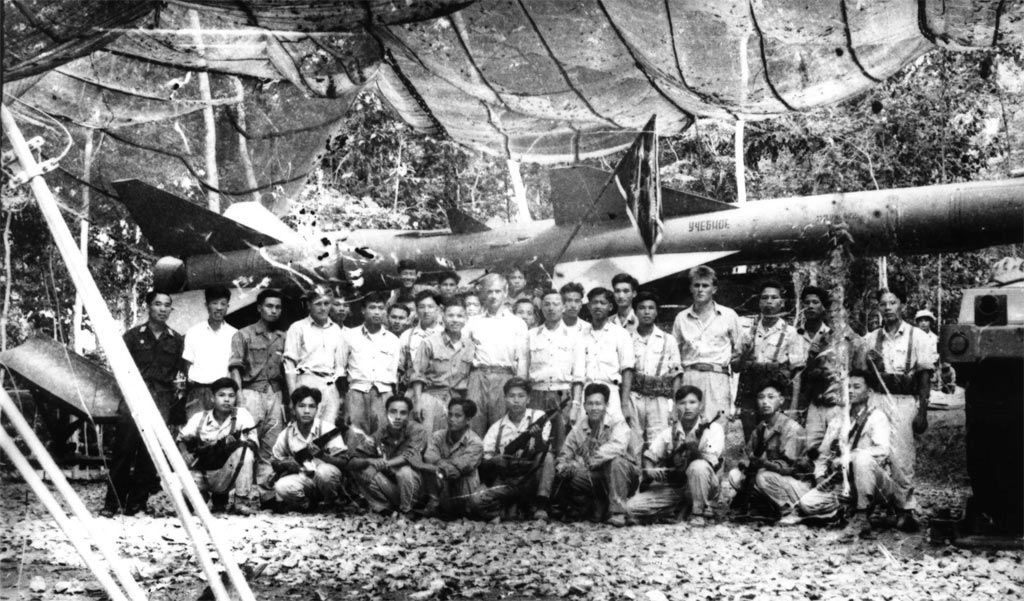
Soviet anti-air instructors and North Vietnamese crewmen in the spring of 1965 at an anti-aircraft training center in Vietnam

Some Russian sources give more specific numbers: Between 1953 and 1991, the hardware donated by the Soviet Union included 2,000 tanks, 1,700 APCs, 7,000 artillery guns, over 5,000 anti-aircraft guns, 158 surface-to-air missile launchers, and 120 helicopters. During the war, the Soviets sent North Vietnam annual arms shipments worth $450 million. From July 1965 to the end of 1974, fighting in Vietnam was observed by some 6,500 officers and generals, as well as more than 4,500 soldiers and sergeants of the Soviet Armed Forces. In addition, Soviet military schools and academies began training Vietnamese soldiers—in all more than 10,000 military personnel.

The KGB also helped to develop the signals intelligence (SIGINT) capabilities of North Vietnam, through an operation known as Vostok (also known as Phương Đông, meaning "Orient" and named after the Vostok 1). The Vostok program was a counterintelligence and espionage program. These programs were pivotal in detecting and defeating CIA and South Vietnamese commando teams sent into North Vietnam, as they were detected and captured. The Soviets helped the Ministry of Public Security recruit foreigners within high-level diplomatic circles among the Western-allies of the US, under a clandestine program known as "B12,MM" which produced thousands of high-level documents for nearly a decade, including targets of B-52 strikes. In 1975, the SIGINT services had broken information from Western US-allies in Saigon, determining that the US would not intervene to save South Vietnam from collapse.

=== Other communist states ===
==== Czechoslovakia ====
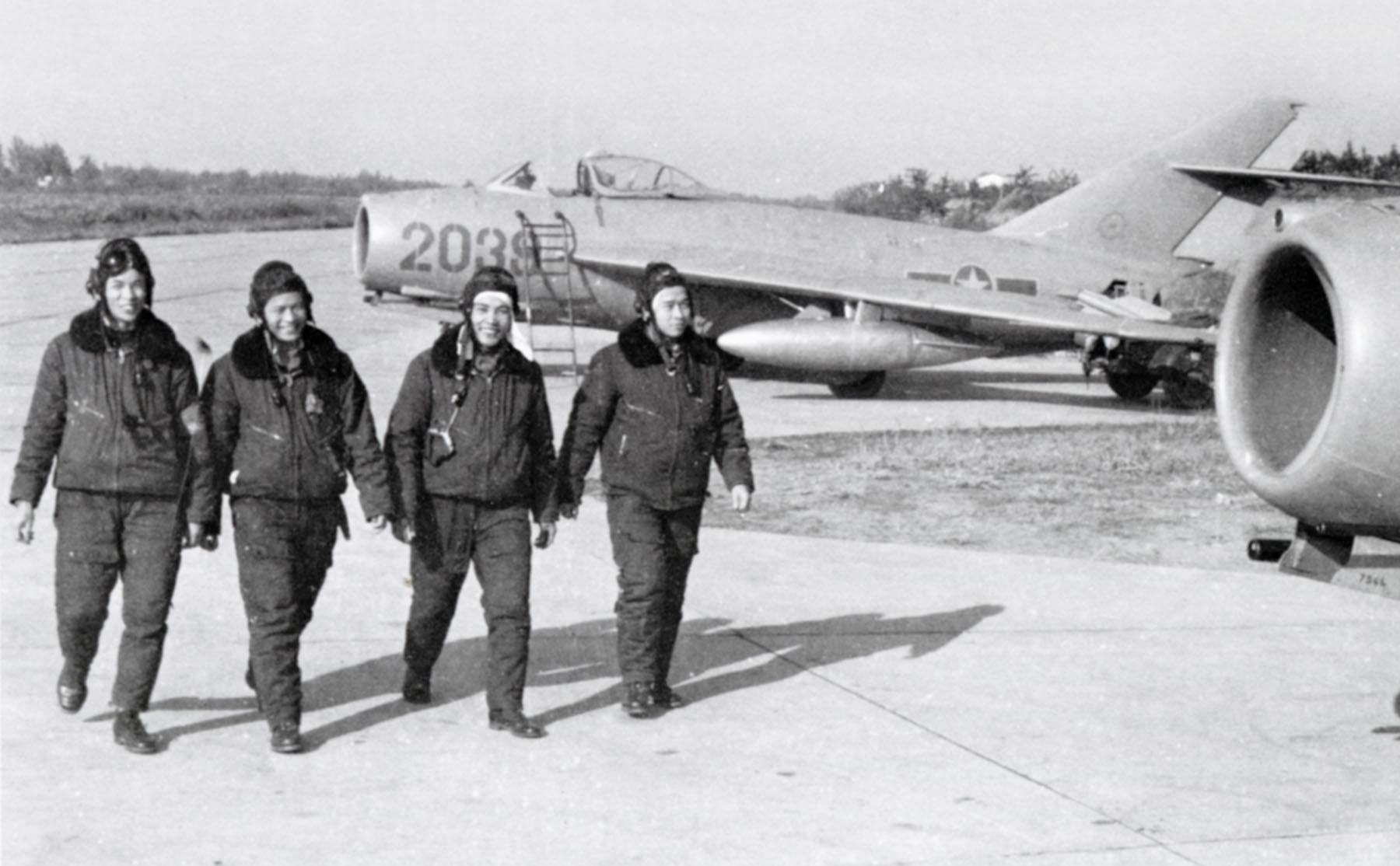
Vietnam People's Air Force pilots walk by their aircraft, the MiG-17. The development of the North Vietnamese Vietnam People's Air Force (VPAF) during the war was assisted by Warsaw Pact nations throughout the war. Between 1966 and 1972 a total of 17 flying aces was credited by the VPAF against US fighters.

The Czechoslovak Socialist Republic was a member of the Warsaw Pact and sent significant aid to North Vietnam, both prior to and after the Prague Spring. The Czechoslovak government created committees which sought to promote and establish peace, while also promoting victory for Viet Cong and PAVN forces. Czech-made equipment and military aid increased significantly following the Prague Spring. Czechoslovakia continued to send tens of thousands of Czech-made rifles as well as mortar and artillery throughout the war. In general, Czechoslovakia was aligned with European leftist movements, and there were simultaneous protests demonstrating against the Soviet intervention in Prague and the US intervention in Vietnam.

Cooperation with Czechoslovakia on the development of North Vietnamese air capabilities began as early as 1956. Czechoslovak instructors and trainers instructed the Vietnam People's Air Force (VPAF) in China and helped them develop a modernised air force, with the Czech-built Aero Ae-45 and Aero L-29 Delfín alongside Zlín Z 26 aircraft utilised significantly for training, and regarded as preferential to Soviet-built Yakovlev Yak-3 as training aircraft.

==== North Korea ====
The Korean Workers' Party decided in October 1966, in early 1967, that North Korea would send a Korean People's Army Air Force fighter squadron to North Vietnam to back up the North Vietnamese 921st and 923rd Fighter Squadrons defending Hanoi. The North Koreans stayed through 1968, and 200 pilots were reported to have served. In addition, at least two anti-aircraft artillery regiments were sent as well.

==== Cuba ====
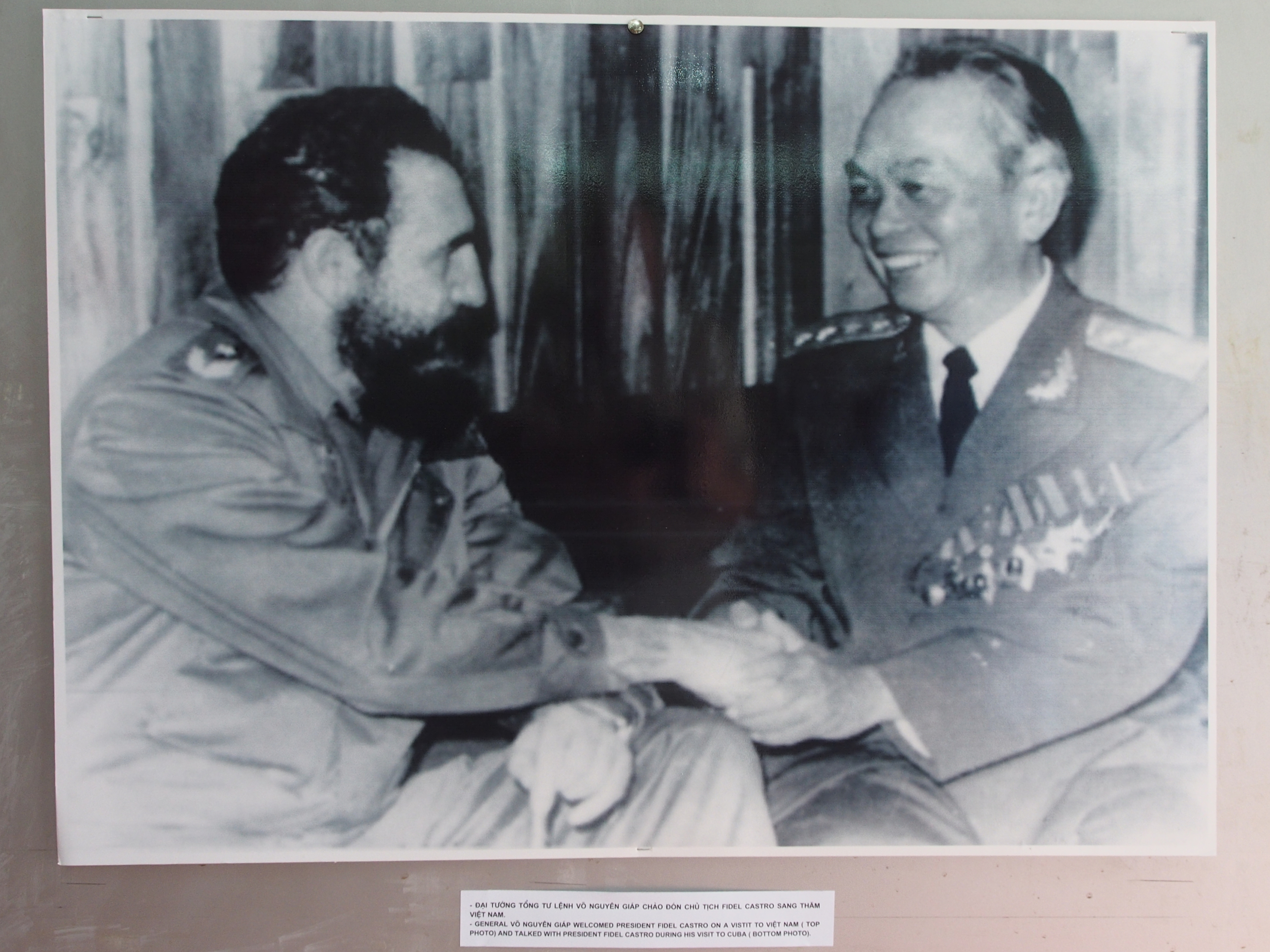
Fidel Castro meeting with Võ Nguyên Giáp at the Vietnam Military History Museum

The contributions to North Vietnam's war effort by the Republic of Cuba under Fidel Castro have been recognized several times by representatives of the Democratic Republic of Vietnam. Castro mentioned in his discourses the Batallón Girón (Giron Battalion) as comprising the Cuban contingent that served as military advisors during the war. In this battalion, the Cubans were aided by Nguyễn Thị Định, founding member of the Viet Cong, who later became the first female major general in the PAVN.

There are numerous allegations by former U.S. prisoners of war that Cuban Revolutionary Armed Forces personnel were present at North Vietnamese prison facilities during the war and that they participated in torture activities. Witnesses to this include Senator John McCain, the 2008 U.S. presidential candidate and a former Vietnam prisoner of war, according to his 1999 book Faith of My Fathers.

==== East Germany ====
The Ministry of Public Security of Vietnam (Bộ Công An) states that there was special interest towards the Stasi of East Germany in establishing an intelligence and security apparatus, particularly since the Stasi was well-regarded due to their industrial, modern, and (with a) scientific working-style. In official Vietnamese language histories on the Vietnamese Ministry of Public Security, the assistance provided by the Soviet and East German intelligence services to Vietnam is usually rated as among the most important within the socialist bloc. East Germany had also assisted North Vietnam in duplicating "Green Dragon" identity cards used in South Vietnam, which were created by Saigon in order to identify North Vietnamese combatants from citizens, and were generally difficult to duplicate.

East German authorities had also begun providing material and technical aid to help develop and modernise the North Vietnamese economy and military. In addition, East Germany had also vigorously denounced the US war effort, and had reaped significant international and diplomatic standing as a result of its anti-war campaigns.

==== Romania ====
Romania was also among primary supporters of North Vietnam during the war in political, economic and military terms. Contemporarily, the Eastern Bloc country was also known for its role in the mediation activities in the mid-1960s, resulting in what became known as the "Trinh Signal" in January 1967, in which Hanoi accepted the possibility of negotiation with Washington.

==== Bulgaria ====
Bulgaria committed their charge-free military and economic supplies to North Vietnam in a bilateral agreement signed in 1972. Bulgarian military aid had already been provided to the latter since 1967. Similar conducts was undertaken by Hungary, which was reaffirmed in mutual visits of Hungary and North Vietnam in 1972 and 1973.

==== Hungary ====
Hungary also expressed their support through their representatives at the International Commission of Control and Supervision, a body established to supervise the implementation of the Paris Peace Accords.

== Pro-South Vietnam ==
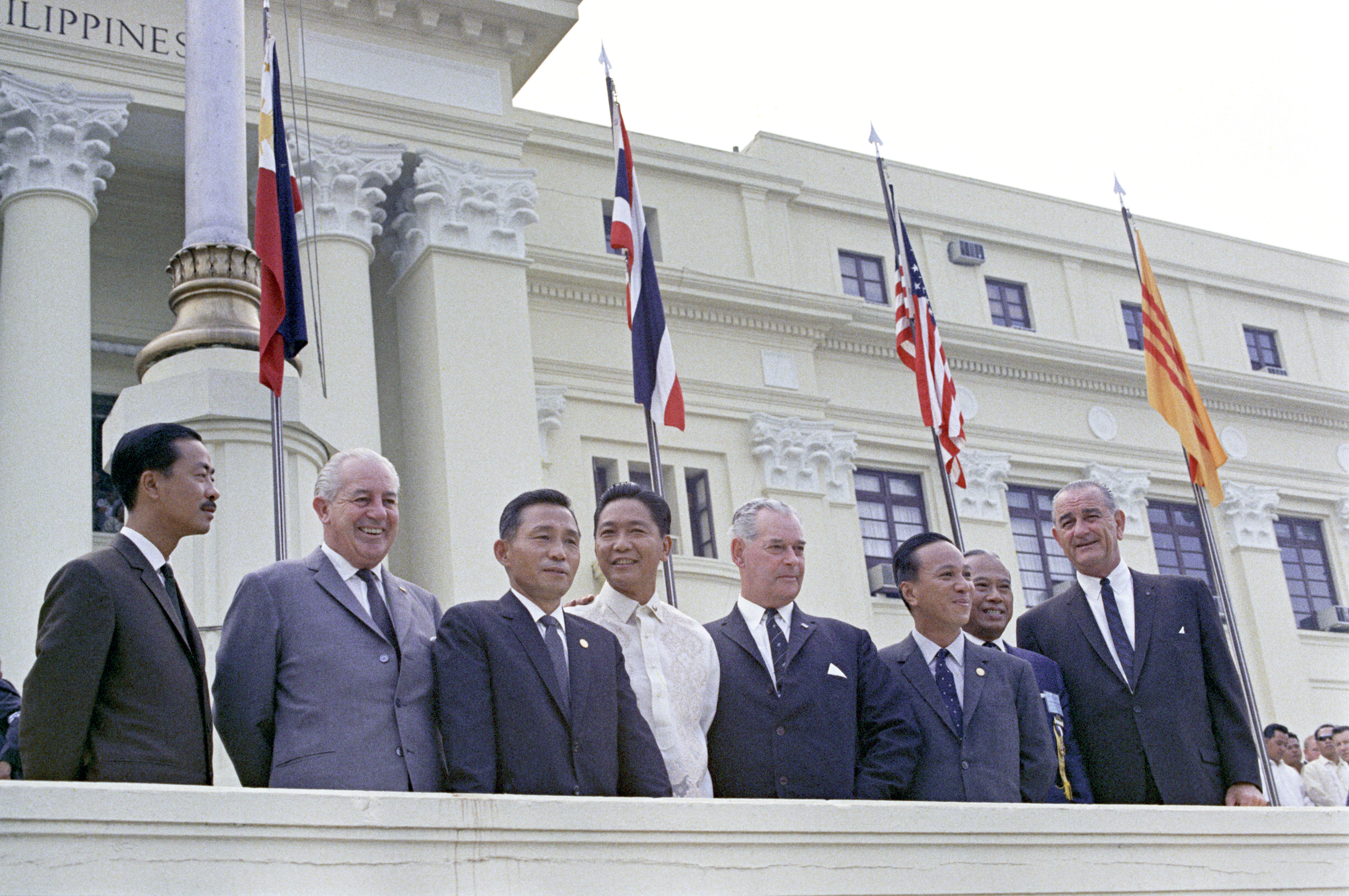
SEATO leaders at the Manila Conference, 1966

As South Vietnam was formally part of a military alliance with the US, Australia, New Zealand, France, the UK, Pakistan, Thailand and the Philippines, the alliance was invoked during the war. The UK, France and Pakistan declined to participate, and South Korea and Taiwan were non-treaty participants.

=== United States ===
The United States was the main ally of France and the State of Vietnam associated with the French Union in the First Indochina War against the communist-led Viet Minh. It recognized the State of Vietnam on 7 February 1950. After Vietnam was divided in 1954 and the State of Vietnam became the Republic of Vietnam (known as "South Vietnam"), the United States was Saigon's main and direct ally in the Vietnam War against the communist North.

=== Other anti-communist states ===
==== South Korea ====
On the anti-communist side, South Korea had the second-largest contingent of foreign troops in South Vietnam after the United States. In November 1961, President Park Chung Hee proposed South Korean participation in the war to John F. Kennedy, but Kennedy disagreed as they were not SEATO treaty members. On 1 May 1964, Lyndon Johnson agreed to permit South Korean participation under the Many Flags Program in return for monetary compensation. The first South Korean troops began arriving in 1964 and large combat formations began arriving a year later. The ROK Marine Corps dispatched their 2nd Marine Brigade, while the ROK Army sent the Capital Division and later the 9th Infantry Division. In August 1966, after the arrival of the 9th Division, the Koreans established a corps command, the Republic of Korea Forces Vietnam Field Command, near I Field Force at Nha Trang.

Evaluation of ROK forces varied over time. Some commanders praised ROK forces for their success and performance, while other commanders critiqued their professionalism and questioned their conduct. One criticism from the State Department questioned corruption amongst Korean troops in regards to diverting US-equipment to South Korea which was sought after by the Korean military. While the lethality and success of ROK forces are praised, often leading to the Viet Cong deliberately avoiding engagements with Korean forces, their brutality aided in adding ranks to an otherwise neutral population.

Approximately 320,000 South Korean soldiers were sent to Vietnam, each serving a one-year tour of duty. Maximum troop levels peaked at 50,000 in 1968, however all were withdrawn by 1973. About 5,099 South Koreans were killed and 10,962 wounded during the war. South Koreans claims to have killed 41,000 Viet Cong. The United States paid South Korean soldiers 236 million dollars for their efforts in Vietnam, and South Korean GNP increased five-fold during the war.

==== Thailand ====
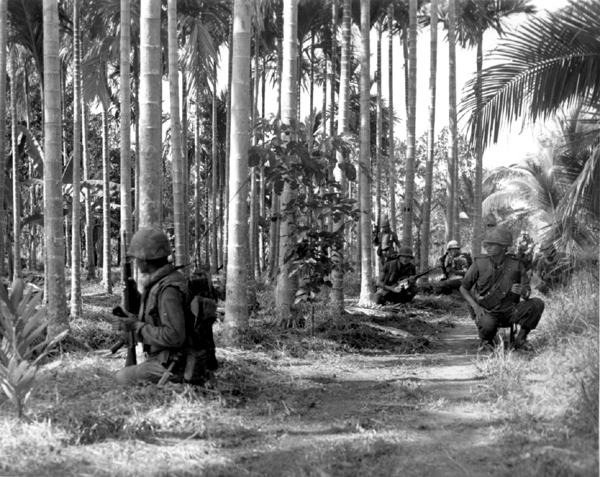
The Thai Queen's Cobra battalion in Phuoc Tho

Thai Army formations, including the Royal Thai Volunteer Regiment (Queen's Cobras) and later the Royal Thai Army Expeditionary Division (Black Panthers), saw action in South Vietnam between 1965 and 1971. Thai forces saw much more action in the covert war in Laos between 1964 and 1972, though Thai regular formations there were heavily outnumbered by the irregulars of the CIA-sponsored Police Aerial Reconnaissance Units or PARU, who carried out reconnaissance activities on the western side of the Ho Chi Minh trail.

From 1961 to 1975, the United States Air Force (USAF) conducted strikes into North Vietnamese territory from Royal Thai Air Force bases. These airbases include:

- Korat AFB
- Takhli AFB
- U-Tapao AFB
- Udorn AFB
- Ubon AFB
- Nakhon Phanom AFB

==== Australia and New Zealand ====
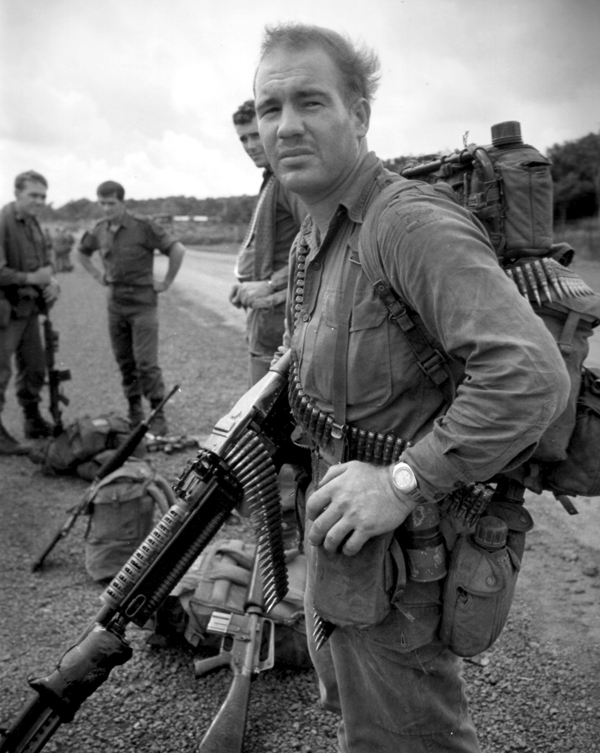
An Australian soldier in Vietnam

Australia and New Zealand, as members of SEATO and the ANZUS military cooperation treaty, sent ground troops to Vietnam. Both nations had experience in counterinsurgency and jungle warfare during the Malayan Emergency and World War II, and their governments subscribed to the domino theory. New Zealand was a more reluctant participant. Some officials expected foreign intervention to fail, and were concerned about corruption in South Vietnam, alongside overstretching Australia's small military which was also at the time deployed to Malaysia.

Australia sent advisors to Vietnam in 1962, and combat troops were committed in 1965. New Zealand began by sending a detachment of engineers and an artillery battery, later sending special forces and regular infantry, which were attached to Australian formations. Australia's peak commitment was 7,672 combat troops and New Zealand's 552. Around 50,190 Australian Defence Force personnel were involved during the war, of which 521 were killed and more than 3,000 wounded. Approximately 3,500 New Zealand Defence Force personnel served in Vietnam, with 37 killed and 187 wounded. Most Australians and New Zealanders served in the 1st Australian Task Force in Phước Tuy Province.

Australian military leaders, with experience from both the Malayan Emergency and its AATTV role in 1962, recognised the necessity of a true counter-insurgency, which relied on providing village-level security, establishing civilian trust and economic incentives and improving ARVN capabilities. Differences in strategy brought Australian commanders into conflict with General William Westmoreland's conventional attrition warfare approach, since Australian ground forces were required to follow US doctrine. Nevertheless, Australian forces were according to some, capable at counter-insurgency, and providing training to South Vietnamese Regional Forces despite being under doctrinal constraints.

==== Philippines ====
A total of 10,450 Philippine Armed Forces troops were dispatched to South Vietnam and primarily supported medical and other civilian pacification projects. Filipino forces operated under the Philippine Civic Action Group-Vietnam. The naval base at Subic Bay was also used for the U.S. Seventh Fleet from 1964 until the end of the war in 1975. Subic Bay and Clark Air Base achieved maximum functionality during the war, as well as supporting an estimated 80,000 locals in allied tertiary businesses that ranged from shoe making to prostitution.

==== Taiwan ====
Beginning in November 1967, Taiwan secretly operated a cargo transport detachment to assist the United States and South Vietnam. Taiwan also provided military training units for the South Vietnamese diving units, later known as the Lien Doi Nguoi Nhai (LDMN) or "Frogman unit" in English. Military commandos from Taiwan were captured by North Vietnamese forces three times trying to infiltrate North Vietnam.

Taiwan was a significant industrial and economic partner of South Vietnam, and the Kuomintang shared ideological similarity with various political movements in South Vietnam. An estimated 15% of Taiwanese exports went to South Vietnam. Upon the fall of the Saigon government, Nguyễn Văn Thiệu had fled to Taipei.

== Neutral or non-belligerent nations ==
=== Canada ===
Canada was a contributor to the three-nation monitoring-force, the International Control Commission (ICC/ICSC) [1954–1973] and, briefly, its successor: the International Commission for Control and Supervision (ICCS) [1973-1973]. Officially, Canada, in spite of having been a NATO member since 1949, did not have state-sanctioned combat involvement in the Vietnam War, and diplomatically, it was "non-belligerent", though the sympathies of the state and many of its citizens were well-understood by both sides. The Vietnam War entry in The Canadian Encyclopedia asserts that Canada's record on the truce commissions was a pro-Saigon partisan one. Under Prime Minister Pierre Trudeau, Immigration and Citizenship Canada notably accepted approximately 40,000 American draft evaders and military deserters as legal immigrants despite U.S. pressure. At the same time, approximately 20,000 to 40,000 Canadians crossed the U.S.-Canada border to illegally enlist in the U.S. Armed Forces for service in Vietnam, of whom at least 134 died.

=== United Kingdom ===
The Johnson administration sought to secure a military commitment from Britain, which the United States was closely allied with through NATO and the Special Relationship. The United States had previously cancelled its planned air intervention at the end of the First Indochina War because of doubts from British Prime Ministers Winston Churchill and Anthony Eden. McNamara and Bundy joked that they would give a billion dollars for one British brigade. After the 1964 general election Johnson began lobbying the new Labour Prime Minister Harold Wilson for a small British Armed Forces deployment. However, the war was deeply unpopular in Britain and Wilson rebuffed Johnson's requests. The denial of military assistance slightly strained U.S.-U.K. relations in the 1960s.

=== Ireland ===
While the Republic of Ireland remained neutral in the conflict, it is estimated that over 2,000 Irishmen fought in the United States Army.

=== Poland ===
Poland was a contributor to the three-nation monitoring-force, the International Control Commission (ICC/ICSC) [1954–1973] and its successor: the International Commission for Control and Supervision (ICCS) [1973–1975]. The Polish People's Republic had played a substantive role in brokering and serving as an intermediary for peace-talks between Hanoi and Saigon, as part of a delegation under the International Control Commission established under the Geneva Accords. Recent evidence has emerged that Poland played an early role in attempting to broker talks between Ngô Đình Nhu and the Diem regime and Hanoi in 1963 in an effort to prevent the expansion of the war, given that Polish representatives were the only communist nation present in Saigon and had acted as a broker and representative for Hanoi.

=== Spain ===
President Johnson had asked the Spanish Caudillo Francisco Franco to contribute a military contingent to the war effort. After lengthy debate between his ministers, Franco took the advice of veteran General Agustín Muñoz Grandes. Franco was even more cautious in committing himself to the US cause and finally decided to send a medical team of around thirty people, and under strict secrecy. The first group of medical soldiers, including four doctors, seven nurses and one officer in charge of military supplies, arrived in Vietnam in September 1966 and worked at Truong Cong Dinh hospital in the Gò Công province. From 1966 to 1971 three other groups, totalling nearly 100 Spaniards, worked at the hospital.

=== Switzerland ===
Switzerland offered medical assistance to South Vietnam. At the same time, they pursued an active policy of neutrality by discreetly engaging North Vietnam through diplomatic channels, advocating for American POWs' rights, and providing a measure of international accountability for Hanoi.

=== Brazil ===
Brazil, under a U.S.-backed military regime, officially supported the United States' position in South Vietnam and contributed a medical team and supplies to the country. It was the only Latin American country with a presence in the region.

=== West Germany ===
The Federal Republic of Germany provided economic and humanitarian aid to South Vietnam.

== See also ==
- First Indochina War § Foreign involvement
- North Vietnamese invasion of Laos
- Ho Chi Minh trail
- Laotian Civil War
- Cambodian Civil War
