= Soyuz T-9 =

1983 Soviet crewed spaceflight to Salyut 7

- Mission type: Dock with Salyut 7
- Operator: NPO Energia
- COSPAR ID: 1983-062A
- SATCAT no.: 14152
- Mission duration: 149 days 10 hours 45 minutes
- Orbits completed: 2,361

Spacecraft properties
- Spacecraft: Soyuz 7K-ST No.16L
- Spacecraft type: Soyuz 7K-ST
- Manufacturer: NPO Energia
- Launch mass: 6,850 kg (15,100 lb)
- Landing mass: 2800 kg
- Dimensions: 7.13 m (23.4 ft) long 2.72 m (8 ft 11 in) wide

Crew
- Crew size: 2
- Members: Vladimir Lyakhov; Aleksandr Aleksandrov
- Callsign: Proton

Start of mission
- Launch date: 27 June 1983, 09:12:00 UTC
- Rocket: Soyuz-U
- Launch site: Baikonur, 1/5
- Contractor: NPO Energia

End of mission
- Landing date: 23 November 1983, 19:58:00 UTC
- Landing site: 160 km at the east of Dzhezkazgan, Kazakhstan

Orbital parameters
- Reference system: Geocentric orbit
- Regime: Low Earth orbit
- Perigee altitude: 201.0 km (124.9 mi)
- Apogee altitude: 229.0 km (142.3 mi)
- Inclination: 51.6°
- Period: 88.6 minutes

Docking with Salyut 7
- Docking port: Aft

Soyuz T-9 (Russian: Союз Т-9, Union T-9) was the 4th expedition to Salyut 7 following the failed docking of Soyuz T-8. It returned lab experiments to Earth. The next mission, Soyuz 7K-ST No.16L (Soyuz 10a), had exploded and thus failed to launch.

Soyuz T-9 achieved successful docking with the station, although the mission was bracketed by the failed attempt of Soyuz T-8 and the launch pad abort of Soyuz T-10 which would follow immediately.

== Crew ==
Position	Crew
Commander	Vladimir Lyakhov; Second spaceflight
Flight engineer	Aleksandr Aleksandrov; First spaceflight

=== Backup crew ===
Position	Crew
Commander	Vladimir Titov
Flight engineer	Gennadi Strekalov

== Mission parameters ==
- Mass: 6850 kg
- Perigee: 201 km
- Apogee: 229 km
- Inclination: 51.6°
- Period: 88.6 minutes

== Mission highlights ==
Fourth expedition to Salyut 7. Its mission was heavily impacted by the Soyuz T-8 docking failure and the Soyuz T-10a Soyuz booster failures which bracketed it.

Almost immediately after docking at Salyut 7's aft port, the crew entered Kosmos 1443 and commenced transferring the 3.5 tons of cargo lining its walls to Salyut 7.

On 27 July 1983, a small object struck a Salyut 7 viewport. It blasted out a 4-mm crater, but did not penetrate the outer of the window's two panes. The Soviets believed it was a member of the Delta Aquariid meteor shower, though it may have been a small piece of orbital debris.

The crew loaded Cosmos 1443's VA capsule with 350 kg of experiment results and hardware no longer in use. It could have held 500 kg, had they had that much to put in. Cosmos 1443 then undocked, in spite of Western predictions that the FGB component would remain attached to Salyut 7 as a space station module. The VA capsule soft-landed on 23 August 1983, and the FGB component continued in orbit until it was deorbited over the Pacific Ocean on 19 September 1983.

The crew also filmed scenes for the movie Return from Orbit.

== See also ==
- List of human spaceflights to Salyut space stations
- List of Salyut expeditions
