= Boris Andreyev (cosmonaut) =

Soviet cosmonaut (1940–2021)

- Born: Boris Dmitriyevich Andreyev; 6 October 1940; Moscow, USSR
- Died: 9 July 2021 (aged 80); Korolyov, Moscow Oblast, Russia
- Space career

Cosmonaut
- Selection: Civilian Specialist Group 4
- Missions: None

Boris Dmitriyevich Andreyev (Russian: Борис Дмитриевич Андреев; 6 October 1940 – 9 July 2021) was a Soviet cosmonaut. He retired in 1983 for medical reasons and subsequently did not fly on any missions into space. He was, however, given backup assignments on several flights.

== Biography ==
=== Early life and education ===
Andreyev was born in Moscow, present day Russia, on October 6, 1940. He graduated from Moscow Bauman-Highschool with an engineering diploma in 1964.

=== Cosmonaut career ===
Andreyev was selected as a Soviet cosmonaut in March 1972. Although he never flew into space, he served as a backup crew member on the Soyuz 16, Soyuz 32, Soyuz 35, and Soyuz T-4 missions. He retired from the space program in September 1983 for medical reasons following a parachuting incident. He then worked in the flight control center as capsule communicator.

=== Death ===
Boris Andreyev died in Korolyov, Moscow Oblast on 9 July 2021, at the age of 80.
