= Soyuz T-4 =

1981 Soviet crewed spaceflight to Salyut 6

- COSPAR ID: 1981-023A
- SATCAT no.: 12334
- Mission duration: 74 days, 17 hours, 37 minutes, 23 seconds
- Orbits completed: 1,178

Spacecraft properties
- Spacecraft type: Soyuz-T
- Manufacturer: NPO Energia
- Launch mass: 6,850 kilograms (15,100 lb)

Crew
- Crew size: 2
- Members: Vladimir Kovalyonok; Viktor Savinykh
- Callsign: Photon

Start of mission
- Launch date: 12 March 1981, 19:00:11 UTC
- Rocket: Soyuz-U
- Launch site: Baikonur 1/5

End of mission
- Landing date: 26 May 1981, 12:37:34 UTC
- Landing site: 125 kilometres (78 mi) E Dzhezkazgan

Orbital parameters
- Reference system: Geocentric
- Regime: Low Earth
- Perigee altitude: 201 kilometres (125 mi)
- Apogee altitude: 250 kilometres (160 mi)
- Inclination: 51.6 degrees
- Period: 88.7 minutes

Docking with Salyut 6
- Docking date: 13 March 1981, 20:33 UTC
- Undocking date: 26 May 1981, 09:20 UTC

Soyuz T-4 was a Soviet space mission which launched the crew of Salyut 6 EO-6, the sixth and final long-duration crew of the Salyut 6 space station. It was launched on 12 March 1981 and docked with the station the next day. During their stay, the EO-6 crew was visited by Soyuz 39 and Soyuz 40. Soyuz T-4 returned to Earth on 26 May 1981; its crew were the last to have inhabited Salyut 6.

== Crew ==
Position	Crew
Commander	Vladimir Kovalyonok; Third and last spaceflight
Flight engineer	Viktor Savinykh; First spaceflight

=== Backup crew ===
Position	Crew
Commander	Vyacheslav Zudov
Flight engineer	Boris Andreyev

== Mission parameters ==
- Mass: 6850 kg
- Perigee: 201 km
- Apogee: 250 km
- Inclination: 51.6°
- Period: 88.7 minutes

== Mission highlights ==
The docking with Salyut 6 was delayed after the Soyuz's onboard Argon computer determined it would occur outside radio range with the TsUP. Despite this, the docking occurred successfully on 13 March 1981. The Progress 12 spacecraft was already docked to the station by the time the crew arrived, and they spent several days unloading the Progress before its undocking on 19 March. This freed the remaining docking port for the arrival of the Soyuz 39/EP-9 crew on 22 March.

In mid-May, Kovalyonok and Savinykh replaced the spacecraft's probe with a Salyut drogue. This may have been an experiment to see if a Soyuz-T docked to a space station could act as a rescue vehicle in the event that an approaching Soyuz-T equipped with a probe experienced docking difficulties and could not return to Earth.

The EO-6 crew undocked from Salyut 6 on 26 May, leaving behind the Soyuz's orbital module. Soyuz T-4 landed over three hours later, touching down 125 kilometres (78 mi) east of Dzhezkazgan, Kazakh SSR.

== See also ==
- List of human spaceflights to Salyut space stations
- List of Salyut expeditions
