= List of Salyut expeditions =

This is a chronological list of expeditions to the Salyut space stations. Initially these expeditions were not numbered, however the crews of Salyut 6 and Salyut 7 were numbered EO-n, where n is sequentially increased with each expedition to that particular station. Taxi crews are excluded from this list (see List of human spaceflights to Salyut space stations for details). Salyut commanders are listed in italics. "Duration" refers to the crew and does not always correspond to "Flight up" or "Flight down". Missions which failed to reach or dock with the station are highlighted in red.

The Salyut programme was a series of Soviet space stations launched during the 1970s and 1980s. Six Salyut space stations were crewed, whilst a number of other stations were not, either due to failures, or because they were prototypes and not designed to be crewed. Crewed flights as part of the Salyut programme ended in 1986, when Salyut was superseded by the Mir space station.

Expedition	Crew	Launch (GMT)	Flight up	Landing (GMT)	Flight down	Duration (days)	Remarks
Salyut 1
—	Vladimir Shatalov; Aleksei Yeliseyev; Nikolai Rukavishnikov	23 April 1971; 23:54	Soyuz 10	25 April 1971; 23:40	Soyuz 10	2.01	Failed to dock
—	Georgi Dobrovolski; Vladislav Volkov; Viktor Patsayev	6 June 1971; 07:55	Soyuz 11	30 June 1971; 02:16	Soyuz 11	23.76	Crew killed during reentry
Salyut 3
—	Pavel Popovich; Yuri Artyukhin	3 July 1974; 18:51	Soyuz 14	19 July 1974; 12:21	Soyuz 14	15.73	
—	Gennadi Sarafanov; Lev Dyomin	26 August 1974; 19:58	Soyuz 15	28 August 1974; 20:10	Soyuz 15	2.01	Failed to dock
Salyut 4
—	Aleksei Gubarev; Georgi Grechko	11 January 1975; 21:43	Soyuz 17	10 February 1975; 11:03	Soyuz 17	29.56	
—	Vasily Lazarev; Oleg Makarov	5 April 1975; 11:04	Soyuz 7K-T #39	5 April 1975; 11:26	Soyuz 7K-T #39	0.02	Failed to orbit
—	Pyotr Klimuk; Vitali Sevastyanov	24 May 1975; 14:58	Soyuz 18	26 July 1975; 14:18	Soyuz 18	62.97	
Salyut 5
—	Boris Volynov; Vitaly Zholobov	6 July 1976; 12:08	Soyuz 21	24 August 1976; 18:32	Soyuz 21	49.27	
—	Vyacheslav Zudov; Valery Rozhdestvensky	14 October 1976; 17:39	Soyuz 23	16 October 1976; 17:45	Soyuz 23	2.00	Failed to dock
—	Viktor Gorbatko; Yuri Glazkov	7 February 1977; 16:11	Soyuz 24	25 February 1977; 09:38	Soyuz 24	17.73	
Salyut 6
—	Vladimir Kovalyonok; Valery Ryumin	9 November 1977; 02:40	Soyuz 25	11 November 1977; 03:25	Soyuz 25	2.03	Failed to dock
EO-1	Yury Romanenko; Georgy Grechko	10 December 1977; 01:18	Soyuz 26	16 March 1978; 11:18	Soyuz 27	96.42	
EO-2	Vladimir Kovalyonok; Aleksandr Ivanchenkov	15 June 1978; 20:16	Soyuz 29	2 November 1978; 11:04	Soyuz 31	139.62	
EO-3	Vladimir Lyakhov; Valery Ryumin	25 February 1979; 11:53	Soyuz 32	19 August 1979; 12:29	Soyuz 34	175.02	Soyuz 33 engine failure
EO-4	Leonid Popov; Valery Ryumin	9 April 1980; 13:38	Soyuz 35	11 October 1980; 09:49	Soyuz 37	184.84	first Vietnamese cosmonaut
EO-5	Leonid Kizim; Oleg Makarov; Gennady Strekalov	27 November 1980; 14:18	Soyuz T-3	10 December 1980; 09:26	Soyuz T-3	12.80	
EO-6	Vladimir Kovalyonok; Viktor Savinykh	12 March 1981; 19:00	Soyuz T-4	26 May 1981; 12:37	Soyuz T-4	74.73	
Salyut 7
EO-1	Anatoli Berezovoy; Valentin Lebedev	13 May 1982; 09:58	Soyuz T-5	10 December 1982; 19:02	Soyuz T-7	211.38	
—	Vladimir Titov; Gennady Strekalov; Aleksandr Serebrov	20 April 1983; 13:10	Soyuz T-8	22 April 1983; 13:28	Soyuz T-8	2.01	Failed to dock
EO-2	Vladimir Lyakhov; Aleksandr Pavlovich Aleksandrov	27 June 1983; 09:12	Soyuz T-9	23 November 1983; 19:58	Soyuz T-9	149.45	
EO-3	Leonid Kizim; Vladimir Solovyov; Oleg Atkov	8 February 1984; 12:07	Soyuz T-10	2 October 1984; 10:57	Soyuz T-11	236.95	
EO-4	Vladimir Dzhanibekov	6 June 1985; 06:39	Soyuz T-13	26 September 1985; 09:51	Soyuz T-13	112.13	
EO-4	Viktor Savinykh	6 June 1985; 06:39	Soyuz T-13	21 November 1985; 10:31	Soyuz T-14	168.16	
EO-4	Vladimir Vasyutin; Aleksandr Volkov	17 September 1985; 12:38	Soyuz T-14	21 November 1985; 10:31	Soyuz T-14	64.91	
EO-5	Leonid Kizim; Vladimir Solovyov	13 March 1986; 12:33	Soyuz T-15	16 July 1986; 12:34	Soyuz T-15	125.00	Also visited Mir as Mir EO-1

== See also ==
- Salyut programme
- List of human spaceflights to Salyut space stations
- List of Salyut visitors
- List of Salyut spacewalks
- List of uncrewed spaceflights to Salyut space stations
- List of Mir Expeditions
- List of International Space Station Expeditions
