= Gurvanbulag, Bulgan =

District in Bulgan Province, Mongolia

Coordinates: 47°44′29″N 103°29′07″E

Gurvanbulag District Гурванбулаг сум ᠭᠤᠷᠪᠠᠨᠪᠤᠯᠠᠭᠰᠤᠮᠤ
- District
- Interactive map of Gurvanbulag District
- Country: Mongolia
- Province: Bulgan Province

Area
  - Total: 2,686 km^{2} (1,037 sq mi)
- Time zone: UTC+8 (UTC + 8)

Gurvanbulag (Mongolian: Гурванбулаг) is a sum (district) of Bulgan Province in northern Mongolia. In 2009, its population was 3,119.

== Geography ==
The district has a total area of 2,686 km^{2}.

== Administrative divisions ==
The district is divided into six bags, which are:

- Agit
- Avzaga
- Berkh
- Khugnu
- Khulst
- Togoo
