= 1981 in spaceflight =

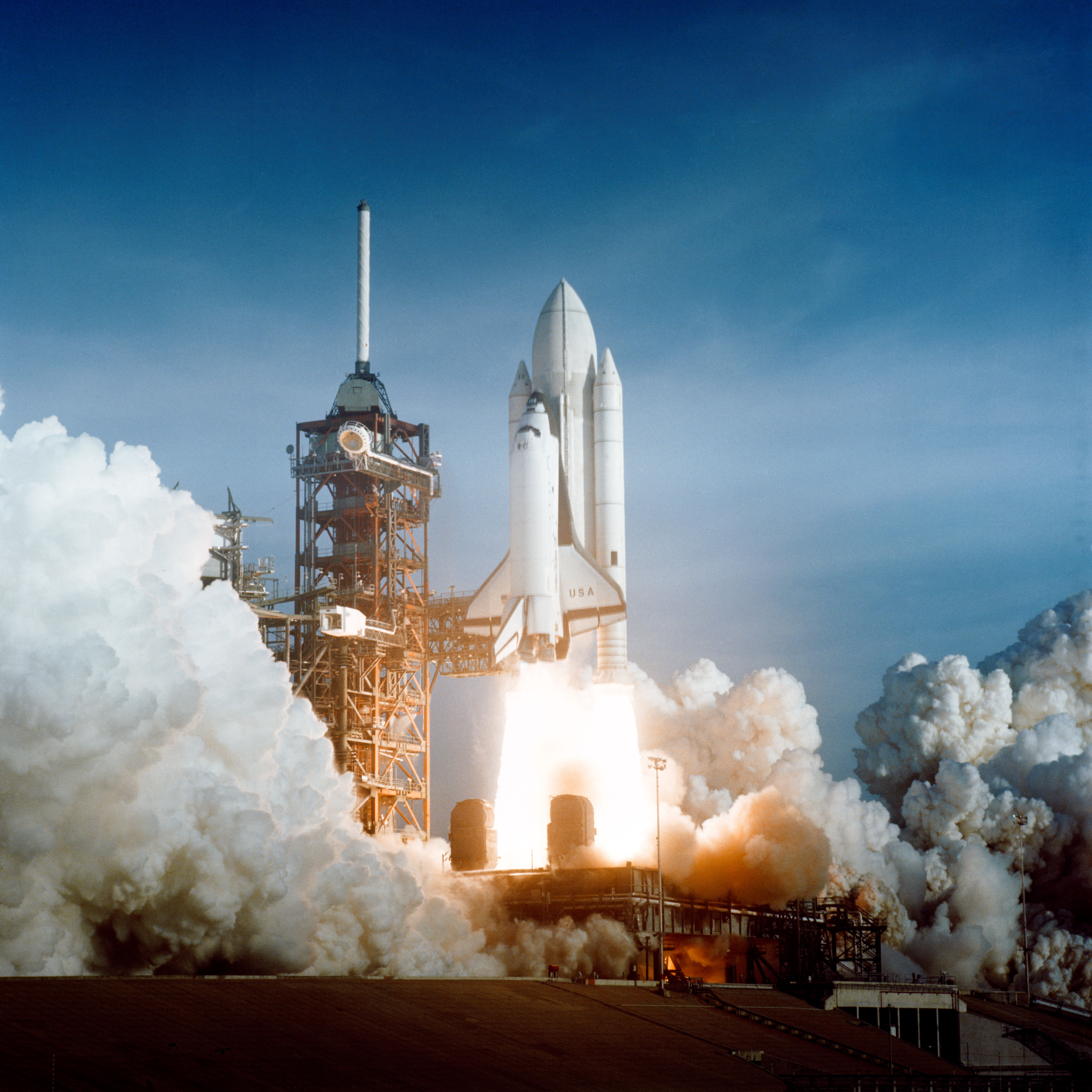
- The launch of STS-1, the maiden flight of the Space Shuttle

Orbital launches
- First: 6 January
- Last: 23 December
- Total: 126
- Successes: 119
- Failures: 6
- Partial failures: 1
- Catalogued: 123

National firsts
- Satellite: Bulgaria
- Space traveller: Mongolia; Romania

Rockets
- Maiden flights: N-II; Space Shuttle Columbia
- Retirements: Feng Bao 1

Crewed flights
- Orbital: 5
- Total travellers: 10

1981 in spaceflight

The following is an outline of 1981 in spaceflight.

== STS-1 ==
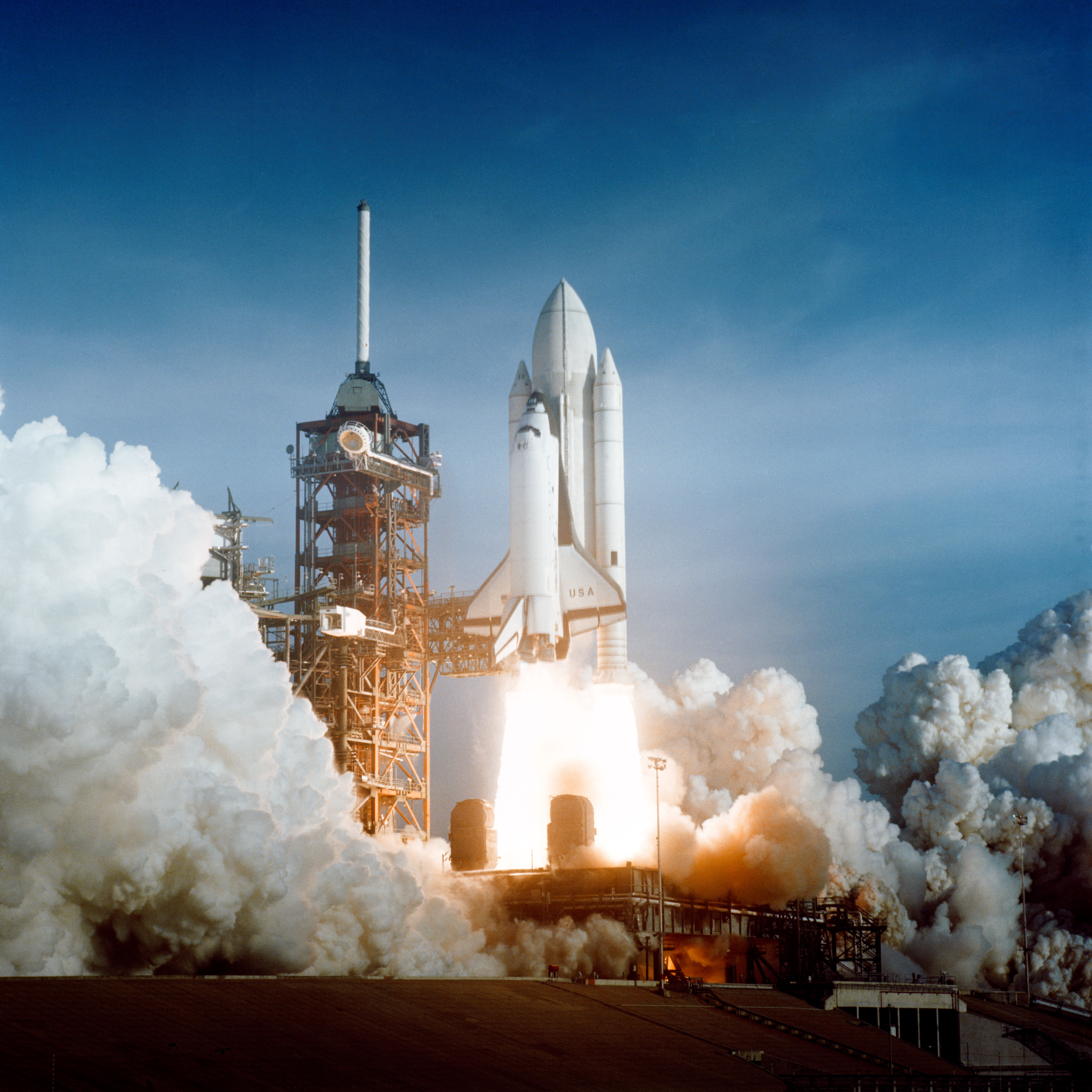
STS-1 lifts off from the Kennedy Space Center on April 12, 1981, the first orbital launch of the Space Shuttle program.

STS-1 (Space Transportation System-1) was the first orbital spaceflight of NASA's Space Shuttle program. The first orbiter, Columbia, launched on April 12, 1981, and returned on April 14, 1981, 54.5 hours later, having orbited the Earth 37 times. Columbia carried a crew of two—commander John W. Young and pilot Robert L. Crippen. It was the first American crewed space flight since the Apollo–Soyuz Test Project (ASTP) in 1975. STS-1 was also the maiden test flight of a new American spacecraft to carry a crew, though it was preceded by atmospheric testing (ALT) of the orbiter and ground testing of the Space Shuttle system.

The launch occurred on the 20th anniversary of Vostok 1, the first human spaceflight, performed by Yuri Gagarin for the USSR. This was a coincidence rather than a celebration of the anniversary; a technical problem had prevented STS-1 from launching two days earlier, as was planned.

== Launches ==
- ← Jan
- Feb
- Mar
- Apr
- May
- Jun
- Jul
- Aug
- Sep
- Oct
- Nov
- Dec →

Date and time (UTC)	Rocket	Flight number	Launch site		LSP	
Date and time (UTC)	Payload (⚀ = CubeSat)	Operator	Orbit	Function	Decay (UTC)	Outcome
Date and time (UTC)	Remarks					
=== January ===
6 January; 12:15	(Soviet Union) Soyuz-U		(Soviet Union) Plesetsk Site 41/1		(Soviet Union) RVSN	
6 January; 12:15	(Soviet Union) Kosmos 1237 (Zenit-6U)		Low Earth	Optical imaging	20 January	Successful
6 January; 12:15	Film capsule recovered					
9 January; 14:57	(Soviet Union) Molniya-M/ML		(Soviet Union) Plesetsk Site 41/1		(Soviet Union) RVSN	
9 January; 14:57	(Soviet Union) Molniya-3 No.25		Molniya	Communications	3 July 1999	Successful
10 January; 18:22	(United States) Nike-Tomahawk		(United Nations) Siple Station		(United States) NASA	
10 January; 18:22	(United States)	NASA	Suborbital	Ionospheric research	10 January	Successful
10 January; 18:22	Apogee: 198 kilometres (123 mi)					
14 January; 22:00	(Japan) TT-500A		(Japan) Tanegashima LA-T		(Japan) NASDA	
14 January; 22:00	(Japan)	NASDA	Suborbital	Test flight	14 January	Successful
14 January; 22:00	Apogee: 320 kilometres (200 mi)					
16 January; 09:00	(Soviet Union) Kosmos-3M		(Soviet Union) Plesetsk Site 132/1		(Soviet Union) RVSN	
16 January; 09:00	(Soviet Union) Kosmos 1238 (Taifun-1)		Low Earth	Radar calibration	In orbit	Successful
16 January; 12:00	(Soviet Union) Soyuz-U		(Soviet Union) Plesetsk Site 41/1		(Soviet Union) RVSN	
16 January; 12:00	(Soviet Union) Kosmos 1239 (Zenit-4MT)		Low Earth	Optical imaging	28 January	Successful
16 January; 12:00	Film capsule recovered					
19 January; 03:37:27	(Canada) Black Brant VB		(Canada) Churchill		(Canada) NRC	
19 January; 03:37:27	(Canada)	NRC	Suborbital	Aeronomy	19 January	Successful
19 January; 03:37:27	Apogee: 263 kilometres (163 mi)					
20 January; 04:50	(United States) Astrobee-F		(United States) White Sands		(United States) NASA	
20 January; 04:50	(United States)	NASA	Suborbital	Ultraviolet astronomy	20 January	Successful
20 January; 04:50	Apogee: 209 kilometres (130 mi)					
20 January; 11:00	(Soviet Union) Soyuz-U		(Soviet Union) Baikonur Site 31/6		(Soviet Union) RVSN	
20 January; 11:00	(Soviet Union) Kosmos 1240 (Yantar-2K No.975)		Low Earth	Optical imaging	17 February	Successful
20 January; 11:00	Returned three film capsules; two small and one large					
21 January; 00:25	(Canada) Black Brant VIII-C		(United States) White Sands		(United States) NASA	
21 January; 00:25	(United States) SPAR-9	NASA	Suborbital	Microgravity research	21 January	Successful
21 January; 00:25	Apogee: 209 kilometres (130 mi)					
21 January; 08:29	(Soviet Union) Kosmos-3M		(Soviet Union) Plesetsk Site 132/1		(Soviet Union) RVSN	
21 January; 08:29	(Soviet Union) Kosmos 1241 (Lira)		Low Earth	ASAT Target	In orbit	Successful
21 January; 08:29	Target for Kosmos 1243 and Kosmos 1258; both interceptors failed					
21 January; 21:46	(Japan) S-310		(Japan) Kagoshima		(Japan) ISAS	
21 January; 21:46	(Japan)	ISAS	Suborbital	Aeronomy	21 January	Successful
21 January; 21:46	Apogee: 174 kilometres (108 mi)					
23 January; 11:20	(Soviet Union) Tsyklon-3		(Soviet Union) Plesetsk Site 32/1		(Soviet Union) RVSN	
23 January; 11:20	(Soviet Union) Musson No.11		Intended: Low Earth	Geodesy	23 January	Launch failure
23 January; 11:20	Payload fairing failed to separate					
24 January; 14:18:02	(Soviet Union) Soyuz-U		(Soviet Union) Baikonur Site 1/5		(Soviet Union)	
24 January; 14:18:02	(Soviet Union) Progress 12		Low Earth (Salyut 6)	Station logistics	20 March	Successful
24 January; 14:18:02	Final resupply mission to Salyut 6					
26 January; 07:20:06	(Canada) Black Brant IVB		(Canada) Churchill		(Canada) NRC	
26 January; 07:20:06	(Canada)	NRC	Suborbital	Auroral research	26 January	Successful
26 January; 07:20:06	Apogee: 584 kilometres (363 mi)					
27 January; 14:58	(Soviet Union) Vostok-2M		(Soviet Union) Plesetsk Site 43/3		(Soviet Union) RVSN	
27 January; 14:58	(Soviet Union) Kosmos 1242 (Tselina-D)		Low Earth	ELINT	8 May 2014	Successful
27 January	(Soviet Union) R-39 Rif		(Soviet Union) Nenoksa		(Soviet Union) RVSN	
27 January	(Soviet Union)	RVSN	Suborbital	Test flight	27 January	Successful
27 January	Apogee: 1,000 kilometres (620 mi), carried five reentry vehicles					
29 January; 04:12	(United States) Astrobee-F		(Canada) Churchill		(United States) NASA	
29 January; 04:12	(United States)	NASA	Suborbital	Auroral research	29 January	Successful
29 January; 04:12	Apogee: 189 kilometres (117 mi)					
29 January; 07:00	(Japan) S-520		(Japan) Kagoshima LA-K		(Japan) ISAS	
29 January; 07:00	(Japan) TPE-2	ISAS	Suborbital	Ionospheric research Technology	29 January	Successful
29 January; 07:00	Apogee: 323 kilometres (201 mi)					
30 January; 16:27	(Soviet Union) Molniya-M/ML		(Soviet Union) Plesetsk Site 43/3		(Soviet Union) RVSN	
30 January; 16:27	(Soviet Union) Molniya 1-49		Molniya	Communications	In orbit	Successful
=== February ===
2 February; 02:19	(Soviet Union) Tsyklon-2		(Soviet Union) Baikonur Site 90		(Soviet Union) RVSN	
2 February; 02:19	(Soviet Union) Kosmos 1243 (IS-A)		Low Earth	ASAT test	2 February	Spacecraft failure
2 February; 02:19	Failed to intercept Kosmos 1241; passed within 50 metres (160 ft) of target but explosive charge failed to detonate					
4 February; 01:10	(United States) Aries		(United States) White Sands LC-36		(United States) US Air Force	
4 February; 01:10	(United States)	US Air Force	Suborbital	Technology	4 February	Successful
4 February; 01:10	Apogee: 387 kilometres (240 mi)					
4 February; 05:00	(France) Centaure		(India) Thumba			
4 February; 05:00	(India)	ISRO	Suborbital	Ionospheric research	4 February	Successful
4 February; 05:00	Apogee: 150 kilometres (93 mi)					
4 February; 15:00	(United States) MGM-31A Pershing		(United States) Cape Canaveral LC-16		(United States) US Army	
4 February; 15:00	(United States)	US Army	Suborbital	Test flight	4 February	
4 February; 15:00	Apogee: 180 kilometres (110 mi)					
4 February; 15:33	(United States) MGM-31A Pershing		(United States) Cape Canaveral LC-16		(United States) US Army	
4 February; 15:33	(United States)	US Army	Suborbital	Test flight	4 February	
4 February; 15:33	Apogee: 180 kilometres (110 mi)					
4 February; 15:53	(United States) MGM-31A Pershing		(United States) Cape Canaveral LC-16		(United States) US Army	
4 February; 15:53	(United States)	US Army	Suborbital	Test flight	4 February	
4 February; 15:53	Apogee: 180 kilometres (110 mi)					
5 February; 11:25	(United States) MGM-29 Sergeant		(United States) Poker Flat		(United States) US Air Force	
5 February; 11:25	(United States)	US Air Force	Suborbital	Auroral research	5 February	Successful
5 February; 11:25	Apogee: 130 kilometres (81 mi)					
6 February; 08:00	(Soviet Union) Kosmos-3M		(Soviet Union) Plesetsk Site 132/1		(Soviet Union)	
6 February; 08:00	(Soviet Union) Interkosmos 21	Interkosmos	Low Earth	Technology	7 July 1982	Successful
6 February; 08:00	Ceased operations on 2 June 1982					
7 February; 20:13:45	(United Kingdom) Petrel 2		(Sweden) Esrange			
7 February; 20:13:45	(United Kingdom)	SRC	Suborbital	Aeronomy	7 February	Successful
7 February; 20:13:45	Apogee: 171 kilometres (106 mi)					
7 February; 20:30:40	(United States) Nike-Orion		(Sweden) Esrange		(Sweden) SSC	
7 February; 20:30:40	(Sweden)	SSC	Suborbital	Aeronomy	7 February	Successful
7 February; 20:30:40	Apogee: 145 kilometres (90 mi)					
9 February; 14:31	(United States) LGM-30G Minuteman III		(United States) Vandenberg LF-08		(United States) US Air Force	
9 February; 14:31	(United States)	US Air Force	Suborbital	Test flight	9 February	Successful
9 February; 14:31	Apogee: 1,300 kilometres (810 mi)					
9 February; 16:38	(United States) LGM-30G Minuteman III		(United States) Vandenberg LF-09		(United States) US Air Force	
9 February; 16:38	(United States)	US Air Force	Suborbital	Test flight	9 February	Successful
9 February; 16:38	Apogee: 1,300 kilometres (810 mi)					
11 February; 08:30	(Japan) (United States) N-II		(Japan) Tanegashima Osaki		(Japan) NASDA	
11 February; 08:30	(Japan) Kiku 3 (ETS-IV)	NASDA	Geostationary transfer	Technology	In orbit	Successful
11 February; 08:30	Maiden flight of N-II; satellite ceased operations on 24 December 1984					
12 February; 05:27	(France) Centaure 2B		(India) Thumba			
12 February; 05:27	(India)	ISRO	Suborbital	Ionospheric research	12 February	Successful
12 February; 05:27	Apogee: 158 kilometres (98 mi)					
12 February; 18:21	(Soviet Union) Kosmos-3M		(Soviet Union) Plesetsk Site 132/1		(Soviet Union) RVSN	
12 February; 18:21	(Soviet Union) Kosmos 1244 (Parus)		Low Earth	Navigation	In orbit	Successful
13 February; 11:15	(Soviet Union) Soyuz-U		(Soviet Union) Plesetsk Site 43/3		(Soviet Union) RVSN	
13 February; 11:15	(Soviet Union) Kosmos 1245 (Zenit-6U)		Low Earth	Optical imaging	27 February	Successful
13 February; 11:15	Film capsule recovered					
13 February; 17:15	(Canada) Black Brant VIII-C		(United States) White Sands		(United States) NASA	
13 February; 17:15	(United States)	NASA	Suborbital	Solar research	13 February	Successful
13 February; 17:15	Apogee: 265 kilometres (165 mi)					
17 February; 17:15	(United States) MGM-31A Pershing		(United States) Cape Canaveral LC-16		(United States) US Army	
17 February; 17:15	(United States)	US Army	Suborbital	Test flight	17 February	
17 February; 17:15	Apogee: 180 kilometres (110 mi)					
17 February; 17:51	(United States) MGM-31A Pershing		(United States) Cape Canaveral LC-16		(United States) US Army	
17 February; 17:51	(United States)	US Army	Suborbital	Test flight	17 February	
17 February; 17:51	Apogee: 180 kilometres (110 mi)					
17 February; 19:17	(United States) MGM-31A Pershing		(United States) Cape Canaveral LC-16		(United States) US Army	
17 February; 19:17	(United States)	US Army	Suborbital	Test flight	17 February	
17 February; 19:17	Apogee: 180 kilometres (110 mi)					
18 February; 09:00	(Soviet Union) Soyuz-U		(Soviet Union) Baikonur Site 31/6		(Soviet Union) RVSN	
18 February; 09:00	(Soviet Union) Kosmos 1246 (Yantar-1KFT No.1)		Low Earth	Optical imaging	13 March	Successful
18 February	(United Kingdom) (Spain) INTA-300		(Spain) El Arenosillo		(Spain) INTA	
18 February	(Spain)	INTA	Suborbital	Aeronomy	18 February	Successful
18 February	Apogee: 285 kilometres (177 mi)					
18 February	(United States) LGM-30B Minuteman IB		(United States) Vandenberg LF-06		United States Air Force	
18 February	(United States)	US Air Force	Suborbital	REV test	18 February	Successful
18 February	Apogee: 1,300 kilometres (810 mi)					
19 February; 10:00	(Soviet Union) Molniya-M/2BL		(Soviet Union) Plesetsk Site 16/2		(Soviet Union) RVSN	
19 February; 10:00	(Soviet Union) Kosmos 1247 (US-K)		Molniya	Missile defence	In orbit	Successful
21 February; 00:30	(Japan) Mu-3S		(Japan) Kagoshima LA-M		(Japan) ISAS	
21 February; 00:30	(Japan) Hinotori (ASTRO-A)	ISAS	Low Earth	Astronomy	11 July 1991	Successful
21 February; 23:23	(United States) Atlas SLV-3D Centaur-D1AR		(United States) Cape Canaveral LC-36A		(United States) NASA	
21 February; 23:23	(United States) Comstar D4	COMSAT; SSC Parallax; TongaSat	Geostationary	Communications	In orbit	Operational
21 February; 23:23	Transferred to SSC Parallax as Parallax 1 in 2001, to TongaSat as Esiafi 1 in 2002.					
21 February	(United States) LGM-30G Minuteman III		(United States) Vandenberg LF-26		(United States) US Air Force	
21 February	(United States)	US Air Force	Suborbital	Test flight	21 February	Successful
21 February	Apogee: 1,300 kilometres (810 mi)					
25 February; 17:20	(United States) Sergeant-Hydac		(United States) Poker Flat		(United States) US Air Force	
25 February; 17:20	(United States)	US Air Force	Suborbital	Test flight	25 February	Successful
25 February; 17:20	Apogee: 400 kilometres (250 mi)					
28 February; 19:10	(United States) Titan III(24)B		(United States) Vandenberg SLC-4W		(United States) US Air Force	
28 February; 19:10	(United States) OPS 1166 (KH-8)	NRO	Sun-synchronous	Optical imaging	20 June	Successful
=== March ===
1 March; 09:20	(West Germany) OTRAG		(Libya) Seba Oasis		(West Germany) OTRAG	
1 March; 09:20	(West Germany)	OTRAG	Suborbital	Test flight	1 March	Successful
1 March; 09:20	Apogee: 150 kilometres (93 mi)					
5 March; 15:00	(Soviet Union) Soyuz-U		(Soviet Union) Plesetsk Site 41/1		(Soviet Union) RVSN	
5 March; 15:00	(Soviet Union) Kosmos 1248 (Yantar-2K No.940)		Low Earth	Optical imaging	4 April	Successful
5 March; 15:00	Returned three film capsules; two small and one large					
5 March; 16:48	(United States) Sergeant-Hydac		(United States) Poker Flat		(United States) US Air Force	
5 March; 16:48	(United States)	US Air Force	Suborbital	Test flight	5 March	Successful
5 March; 16:48	Apogee: 400 kilometres (250 mi)					
5 March; 18:09	(Soviet Union) Tsyklon-2		(Soviet Union) Baikonur Site 90		(Soviet Union) RVSN	
5 March; 18:09	(Soviet Union) Kosmos 1249 (US-A)		Low Earth	Radar imaging	19 July	Successful
6 March; 11:31	(Soviet Union) Kosmos-3M		(Soviet Union) Plesetsk Site 132/2		(Soviet Union) RVSN	
6 March; 11:31	(Soviet Union) Kosmos 1250 (Strela-1M)		Low Earth	Communications	In orbit	Successful
6 March; 11:31	(Soviet Union) Kosmos 1251 (Strela-1M)		Low Earth	Communications	In orbit	Successful
6 March; 11:31	(Soviet Union) Kosmos 1252 (Strela-1M)		Low Earth	Communications	In orbit	Successful
6 March; 11:31	(Soviet Union) Kosmos 1253 (Strela-1M)		Low Earth	Communications	In orbit	Successful
6 March; 11:31	(Soviet Union) Kosmos 1254 (Strela-1M)		Low Earth	Communications	In orbit	Successful
6 March; 11:31	(Soviet Union) Kosmos 1255 (Strela-1M)		Low Earth	Communications	In orbit	Successful
6 March; 11:31	(Soviet Union) Kosmos 1256 (Strela-1M)		Low Earth	Communications	In orbit	Successful
6 March; 11:31	(Soviet Union) Kosmos 1257 (Strela-1M)		Low Earth	Communications	In orbit	Successful
7 March; 08:09	(United States) Taurus-Orion		(United States) Poker Flat		(United States) US Air Force	
7 March; 08:09	(United States)	US Air Force	Suborbital	Auroral research	7 March	Successful
7 March; 08:09	Apogee: 156 kilometres (97 mi)					
7 March; 08:09	(United States) Taurus-Orion		(United States) Poker Flat		(United States) US Air Force	
7 March; 08:09	(United States)	US Air Force	Suborbital	Aeronomy; Auroral research	7 March	Successful
7 March; 08:09	Apogee: 203 kilometres (126 mi)					
7 March; 08:26	(United States) Taurus-Orion		(United States) Poker Flat		(United States) US Air Force	
7 March; 08:26	(United States)	US Air Force	Suborbital	Auroral research	7 March	Successful
7 March; 08:26	Apogee: 169 kilometres (105 mi)					
7 March; 08:38	(United States) Paiute-Tomahawk		(United States) Poker Flat		(United States) US Air Force	
7 March; 08:38	(United States)	US Air Force	Suborbital	Auroral research	7 March	Successful
7 March; 08:38	Apogee: 187 kilometres (116 mi)					
8 March; 16:00	(United States) Nike-Orion		(Canada) Churchill		(United States) NASA	
8 March; 16:00	(United States) CWAS-1	NASA	Suborbital	Aeronomy	8 March	Successful
8 March; 16:00	Apogee: 140 kilometres (87 mi)					
12 March; 04:30	(United States) Sergeant-Hydac		(United States) Poker Flat		(United States) US Air Force	
12 March; 04:30	(United States)	US Air Force	Suborbital	Test flight	12 March	Successful
12 March; 04:30	Apogee: 400 kilometres (250 mi)					
12 March; 19:00:11	(Soviet Union) Soyuz-U		(Soviet Union) Baikonur Site 1/5		(Soviet Union) RVSN	
12 March; 19:00:11	(Soviet Union) Soyuz T-4		Low Earth (Salyut 6)	Salyut 6 expedition	26 May; 12:37:34	Successful
12 March; 19:00:11	Crewed flight with two cosmonauts, last long-duration crew of Salyut 6					
13 March; 16:00	(United States) Nike-Orion		(Canada) Churchill		(United States) NASA	
13 March; 16:00	(United States) CWAS-2	NASA	Suborbital	Aeronomy	13 March	Successful
13 March; 16:00	Apogee: 140 kilometres (87 mi)					
14 March; 16:55	(Soviet Union) Tsyklon-2		(Soviet Union) Baikonur Site 90		(Soviet Union) RVSN	
14 March; 16:55	(Soviet Union) Kosmos 1258 (IS-A)		Low Earth	ASAT test	14 March	Spacecraft failure
14 March; 16:55	Failed to intercept Kosmos 1241					
15 March	(United States) LGM-30B Minuteman IB		(United States) Vandenberg LF-03		(United States) US Air Force	
15 March	(United States)	US Air Force	Suborbital	REV test	15 March	Successful
15 March	Apogee: 1,300 kilometres (810 mi)					
16 March; 19:24:00	(United States) Titan III(23)C		(United States) Cape Canaveral LC-40		(United States) US Air Force	
16 March; 19:24:00	(United States) OPS 7350 (DSP F-9)	US Air Force	Geostationary	Missile defence	In orbit	Successful
16 March; 19:24:00	Operated until 1992					
17 March; 08:40	(Soviet Union) Soyuz-U		(Soviet Union) Baikonur Site 31/6		(Soviet Union) RVSN	
17 March; 08:40	(Soviet Union) Kosmos 1259 (Zenit-6U)		Low Earth	Optical imaging	31 March	Successful
17 March; 08:40	Film capsule recovered					
18 March; 04:40	(Soviet Union) Proton-K/DM		(Soviet Union) Baikonur Site 200/40		(Soviet Union) RVSN	
18 March; 04:40	(Soviet Union) Gran' No.18L		Geosynchronous	Communications		
20 March; 23:45	(Soviet Union) Tsyklon-2		(Soviet Union) Baikonur Site 90		(Soviet Union) RVSN	
20 March; 23:45	(Soviet Union) Kosmos 1260 (US-P)		Low Earth	ELINT	22 May 1982	Successful
22 March; 14:58:55	(Soviet Union) Soyuz-U		(Soviet Union) Baikonur Site 31/6		(Soviet Union) RVSN	
22 March; 14:58:55	(Soviet Union) Soyuz 39		Low Earth (Salyut 6)	Salyut 6 visit	30 March; 11:40:58	Successful
22 March; 14:58:55	Crewed flight with two cosmonauts, carried first Mongolian in space					
24 March; 03:00	(Canada) Black Brant VIII-C		(United States) White Sands		(United States) NASA	
24 March; 03:00	(United States)	NASA	Suborbital	Ultraviolet astronomy	24 March	Successful
24 March; 03:00	Apogee: 261 kilometres (162 mi)					
24 March; 03:31	(Soviet Union) Molniya-M/ML		(Soviet Union) Plesetsk Site 41/1		(Soviet Union) RVSN	
24 March; 03:31	(Soviet Union) Molniya-3 No.24		Molniya	Communications	19 October 1992	Successful
25 March; 08:05:16	(United States) Taurus Tomahawk		(United States) Poker Flat		(United States) NASA	
25 March; 08:05:16	(United States)	NASA	Suborbital	Plasma research	25 March	Successful
25 March; 08:05:16	Apogee: 500 kilometres (310 mi)					
28 March; 01:54:06	(Canada) Black Brant VB		(Canada) Churchill		(Canada) NRC	
28 March; 01:54:06	(Canada)	NRC	Suborbital	Ionospheric research	28 March	Successful
28 March; 01:54:06	Apogee: 327 kilometres (203 mi)					
28 March; 01:54	(Canada) Black Brant IVB		(Canada) Churchill		(Canada) NRC	
28 March; 01:54	(Canada)	NRC	Suborbital	Ionospheric research	28 March	Successful
28 March; 01:54	Apogee: 675 kilometres (419 mi)					
28 March; 09:30	(Soviet Union) Soyuz-U		(Soviet Union) Baikonur Site 31/6		(Soviet Union) RVSN	
28 March; 09:30	(Soviet Union) Yantar-2K No.979		Intended: Low Earth	Optical imaging	28 March	Launch failure
28 March; 09:30	Failed to orbit					
30 March; 05:52:55	(United States) Nike-Orion		(United States) Poker Flat		(United States) DNA	
30 March; 05:52:55	(United States)	DNA	Suborbital	Aeronomy	30 March	Successful
30 March; 05:52:55	Apogee: 140 kilometres (87 mi)					
31 March; 09:40	(Soviet Union) Molniya-M/2BL		(Soviet Union) Plesetsk Site 41/1		(Soviet Union) RVSN	
31 March; 09:40	(Soviet Union) Kosmos 1261 (US-K)		Molniya	Missile defence	In orbit	Successful
=== April ===
1 April; 09:04:35	(United States) Taurus-Tomahawk		(United States) Poker Flat		(United States) NASA	
1 April; 09:04:35	(United States)	NASA	Suborbital	Plasma research	1 April	Successful
1 April; 09:04:35	Apogee: 500 kilometres (310 mi)					
1 April; 09:10	(United States) UGM-96 Trident I C4		(United States) USS Simon Bolivar, Eastern Test Range		(United States) US Navy	
1 April; 09:10	(United States)	US Navy	Suborbital	Test flight	1 April	Successful
1 April; 09:10	Apogee: 1,000 kilometres (620 mi)					
1 April	(United States) LGM-30G Minuteman III		(United States) Vandenberg LF-04		(United States) US Air Force	
1 April	(United States)	US Air Force	Suborbital	Test flight	1 April	Successful
1 April	Apogee: 1,300 kilometres (810 mi)					
1 April	(Soviet Union) R-39 Rif		(Soviet Union) Nenoksa		(Soviet Union) RVSN	
1 April	(Soviet Union)	RVSN	Suborbital	Test flight	1 April	Launch failure
1 April	Apogee: 100 kilometres (62 mi)					
2 April; 09:48	(United States) Taurus-Orion		(United States) Wallops		(United States) NASA	
2 April; 09:48	(United States)	NASA	Suborbital	Plasma research	2 April	Successful
2 April; 09:48	Apogee: 220 kilometres (140 mi)					
3 April; 06:20:55	(United States) Nike-Orion		(United States) Poker Flat		(United States) DNA	
3 April; 06:20:55	(United States)	DNA	Suborbital	Aeronomy	3 April	Successful
3 April; 06:20:55	Apogee: 140 kilometres (87 mi)					
3 April; 09:51	(United States) Taurus-Orion		(United States) Wallops		(United States) NASA	
3 April; 09:51	(United States)	NASA	Suborbital	Plasma research	3 April	Successful
3 April; 09:51	Apogee: 210 kilometres (130 mi)					
4 April	(United States) LGM-30B Minuteman IB		(United States) Vandenberg LF-06		(United States) US Air Force	
4 April	(United States)	US Air Force	Suborbital	REV test	4 April	Successful
4 April	Apogee: 1,300 kilometres (810 mi)					
7 April; 10:51	(Soviet Union) Soyuz-U		(Soviet Union) Plesetsk Site 43/3		(Soviet Union) RVSN	
7 April; 10:51	(Soviet Union) Kosmos 1262 (Zenit-6U)		Low Earth	Optical imaging	21 April	Successful
7 April; 10:51	Film capsule recovered					
7 April; 14:00	(United States) MGM-31A Pershing		(United States) Cape Canaveral LC-16		(United States) US Army	
7 April; 14:00	(United States)	US Army	Suborbital	Test flight	7 April	Unknown
7 April; 14:00	Apogee: 180 kilometres (110 mi)					
7 April; 14:19	(United States) MGM-31A Pershing		(United States) Cape Canaveral LC-16		(United States) US Army	
7 April; 14:19	(United States)	US Army	Suborbital	Test flight	7 April	Unknown
7 April; 14:19	Apogee: 180 kilometres (110 mi)					
7 April; 14:40	(United States) MGM-31A Pershing		(United States) Cape Canaveral LC-16		(United States) US Army	
7 April; 14:40	(United States)	US Army	Suborbital	Test flight	7 April	Unknown
7 April; 14:40	Apogee: 180 kilometres (110 mi)					
9 April; 12:00	(Soviet Union) Kosmos-3M		(Soviet Union) Plesetsk Site 132/1		(Soviet Union) RVSN	
9 April; 12:00	(Soviet Union) Kosmos 1263 (Taifun-1)		Low Earth	Radar calibration	In orbit	Successful
12 April; 12:00:04	(United States) Space Shuttle Columbia		(United States) Kennedy LC-39A		(United States) NASA	
12 April; 12:00:04	(United States) STS-1	NASA	Low Earth	Test flight	14 April	Successful
12 April; 12:00:04	(United States) DFI	NASA	Low Earth (Columbia)	Flight recorder	14 April	Successful
12 April; 12:00:04	Maiden flight of the Space Shuttle, carried two astronauts					
15 April; 10:30	(Soviet Union) Soyuz-U		(Soviet Union) Baikonur Site 31/6		(Soviet Union) RVSN	
15 April; 10:30	(Soviet Union) Kosmos 1264 (Zenit-6U)		Low Earth	Optical imaging	29 April	Successful
15 April; 10:30	Film capsule recovered					
16 April; 11:30	(Soviet Union) Soyuz-U		(Soviet Union) Plesetsk Site 41/1		(Soviet Union) RVSN	
16 April; 11:30	(Soviet Union) Kosmos 1265 (Zenit-6U)		Low Earth	Optical imaging	28 April	Successful
16 April; 11:30	Film capsule recovered					
18 April	(Soviet Union) MR-UR-100U		(Soviet Union) Baikonur Site 172		(Soviet Union) RVSN	
18 April	(Soviet Union)	RVSN	Suborbital	Test flight	18 April	Successful
18 April	Apogee: 1,000 kilometres (620 mi)					
21 April; 03:45	(Soviet Union) Tsyklon-2		(Soviet Union) Baikonur Site 90		(Soviet Union) RVSN	
21 April; 03:45	(Soviet Union) Kosmos 1266 (US-A)		Low Earth	Radar imaging	20 May	
21 April; 03:45	Nuclear powered; reactor ejected and remains in orbit					
22 April	(Soviet Union) R-39 Rif		(Soviet Union) Nenoksa		(Soviet Union) RVSN	
22 April	(Soviet Union)	RVSN	Suborbital	Test flight	22 April	Launch failure
22 April	Failed to reach space; apogee: 30 kilometres (19 mi)					
24 April; 21:32	(United States) Titan III(34)B		(United States) Vandenberg SLC-4W		(United States) US Air Force	
24 April; 21:32	(United States) OPS 7225 (Quasar)	NRO	Molniya	Communications	In orbit	Successful
25 April; 02:01	(Soviet Union) Proton-K		(Soviet Union) Baikonur Site 200/39		(Soviet Union) RVSN	
25 April; 02:01	(Soviet Union) Kosmos 1267 (TKS No.16301)		Low Earth (Salyut 6)	Technology	29 July 1982	Successful
25 April; 02:01	Technology demonstration for modular space stations; permanently docked to Salyut 6 and used to deorbit station; return capsule separated prior to docking and recovered on 24 May 1981					
27 April; 23:15	(United States) Aries		(United States) White Sands LC-36		(United States) NASA	
27 April; 23:15	(United States)	NASA	Suborbital	Ultraviolet astronomy	27 April	Successful
27 April; 23:15	Apogee: 263 kilometres (163 mi)					
28 April; 09:00	(Soviet Union) Soyuz-U		(Soviet Union) Baikonur Site 31/6		(Soviet Union) RVSN	
28 April; 09:00	(Soviet Union) Kosmos 1268 (Zenit-6U)		Low Earth	Optical imaging	12 May	Successful
28 April; 09:00	Film capsule recovered					
30 April; 06:00	(United Kingdom) Skylark 7		(Sweden) Esrange			
30 April; 06:00	(West Germany) TEXUS IIIB	DFVLR	Suborbital	Microgravity research	30 April	Successful
30 April; 06:00	Apogee: 253 kilometres (157 mi)					
April	(Soviet Union) R-17 Elbrus		(Iraq)		(Iraq)	
April	(Iraq)		Suborbital	Missile strike		
April	Apogee: 100 kilometres (62 mi), launched as part of the Iran–Iraq War					
April	(Soviet Union) R-17 Elbrus		(Iraq)		(Iraq)	
April	(Iraq)		Suborbital	Missile strike		Successful
April	Apogee: 100 kilometres (62 mi), launched as part of the Iran–Iraq War					
April	(Soviet Union) R-17 Elbrus		(Iraq)		(Iraq)	
April	(Iraq)		Suborbital	Missile strike		Successful
April	Apogee: 100 kilometres (62 mi), launched as part of the Iran–Iraq War					
April	(Soviet Union) R-17 Elbrus		(Iraq)		(Iraq)	
April	(Iraq)		Suborbital	Missile strike		Successful
April	Apogee: 100 kilometres (62 mi), launched as part of the Iran–Iraq War					
April	(Soviet Union) R-17 Elbrus		(Iraq)		(Iraq)	
April	(Iraq)		Suborbital	Missile strike		Successful
April	Apogee: 100 kilometres (62 mi), launched as part of the Iran–Iraq War					
=== May ===
4 May; 07:55	(Canada) Black Brant VIII-C		(United States) White Sands		(United States) NASA	
4 May; 07:55	(United States)	NASA	Suborbital	X-ray astronomy	4 May	Successful
4 May; 07:55	Apogee: 294 kilometres (183 mi)					
6 May; 08:00	(Canada) Black Brant VIII-C		(United States) White Sands		(United States) NASA	
6 May; 08:00	(United States)	NASA	Suborbital	Aeronomy	6 May	Successful
6 May; 08:00	Apogee: 322 kilometres (200 mi)					
7 May; 13:21	(Soviet Union) Kosmos-3M		(Soviet Union) Plesetsk Site 132/1		(Soviet Union) RVSN	
7 May; 13:21	(Soviet Union) Kosmos 1269 (Strela-2M)		Low Earth	Communications	In orbit	Successful
8 May; 05:27	(United Kingdom) Skylark 7		(Sweden) Esrange			
8 May; 05:27	(West Germany) TEXUS IV	DFVLR	Suborbital	Microgravity research	8 May	Successful
8 May; 05:27	Apogee: 258 kilometres (160 mi)					
14 May; 17:16:38	(Soviet Union) Soyuz-U		(Soviet Union) Baikonur Site 1/5		(Soviet Union) RVSN	
14 May; 17:16:38	(Soviet Union) Soyuz 40		Low Earth	Salyut 6 visit	22 May; 13:58:30	Successful
14 May; 17:16:38	Crewed mission with two cosmonauts, carried first Romanian in space. Final crewed flight to Salyut 6, final flight of Soyuz 7K-T spacecraft					
14 May; 21:45	(Soviet Union) Vostok-2M		(Soviet Union) Plesetsk Site 43/3		(Soviet Union) RVSN	
14 May; 21:45	(Soviet Union) Meteor-2 No.8		Low Earth	Weather	In orbit	Successful
15 May; 06:07:17	(United States) Scout G-1		(United States) Vandenberg SLC-5		(United States)	
15 May; 06:07:17	(United States) Nova-1 (NNS-30480)	US Navy	Low Earth	Navigation	In orbit	Successful
18 May; 11:50	(Soviet Union) Soyuz-U		(Soviet Union) Baikonur Site 31/6		(Soviet Union) RVSN	
18 May; 11:50	(Soviet Union) Kosmos 1270 (Yantar-2K No.980)		Low Earth	Optical imaging	17 June	Successful
19 May; 03:49	(Soviet Union) Vostok-2M		(Soviet Union) Plesetsk Site 43/3		(Soviet Union) RVSN	
19 May; 03:49	(Soviet Union) Kosmos 1271 (Tselina-D)		Low Earth	ELINT	In orbit	Successful
21 May; 09:10	(Soviet Union) Soyuz-U		(Soviet Union) Baikonur Site 31/6		(Soviet Union) RVSN	
21 May; 09:10	(Soviet Union) Kosmos 1272 (Zenit-6U)		Low Earth	Optical imaging	4 June	Successful
22 May; 07:10	(Soviet Union) Soyuz-U		(Soviet Union) Plesetsk Site 41/1		(Soviet Union) RVSN	
22 May; 07:10	(Soviet Union) Kosmos 1273 (Zenit-4MKT No.17)		Low Earth	Optical imaging	4 June	Successful
22 May; 22:29	(United States) Delta 3914		(United States) Cape Canaveral LC-17A		(United States) NASA	
22 May; 22:29	(United States) GOES 5 (GOES-E)	NOAA	Geostationary	Weather	In orbit	Partial spacecraft failure
22 May; 22:29	Primary instrument failed in 1984, satellite remained partially operable until decommissioned on 18 July 1990					
23 May; 22:42	(United States) Atlas SLV-3D Centaur-D1AR		(United States) Cape Canaveral LC-36B		(United States) NASA	
23 May; 22:42	(United Nations) Intelsat V F-1	Intelsat	Geostationary	Communications	In orbit	Successful
27 May; 04:25	(Canada) Black Brant VC		(United States) White Sands LC-36		(United States) NASA	
27 May; 04:25	(United States)	JHU	Suborbital	Ultraviolet astronomy	27 May	Successful
27 May; 04:25	Apogee: 225 kilometres (140 mi)					
31 May; 05:00	(India) Satellite Launch Vehicle		(India) Sriharikota SLV Pad		(India) ISRO	
31 May; 05:00	(India) Rohini RS-D1	ISRO	Low Earth	Technology	8 June	Launch failure
31 May; 05:00	Reached lower-than-planned orbit and quickly decayed					
May	(Soviet Union) MR-12		(Soviet Union) Professor Zubov, Atlantic Ocean		(Soviet Union)	
May	(Soviet Union)		Suborbital	Aeronomy		Successful
May	Apogee: 150 kilometres (93 mi)					
May	(Soviet Union) MR-12		(Soviet Union) Professor Zubov, Atlantic Ocean		(Soviet Union)	
May	(Soviet Union)		Suborbital	Aeronomy		Successful
May	Apogee: 150 kilometres (93 mi)					
May	(Soviet Union) MR-12		(Soviet Union) Professor Zubov, Atlantic Ocean		(Soviet Union)	
May	(Soviet Union)		Suborbital	Aeronomy		Successful
May	Apogee: 150 kilometres (93 mi)					
May	(Soviet Union) MR-12		(Soviet Union) Professor Zubov, Atlantic Ocean		(Soviet Union)	
May	(Soviet Union)		Suborbital	Aeronomy		Successful
May	Apogee: 150 kilometres (93 mi)					
=== June ===
3 June; 14:00	(Soviet Union) Soyuz-U		(Soviet Union) Plesetsk Site 41/1		(Soviet Union) RVSN	
3 June; 14:00	(Soviet Union) Kosmos 1274 (Yantar-2K No.942)		Low Earth	Optical imaging	3 July	Successful
3 June	(France) S3		(France) Biscarosse		(France) DGA	
3 June	(France)	DGA	Suborbital	Test flight	3 June	Successful
3 June	Apogee: 1,000 kilometres (620 mi)					
4 June; 15:41	(Soviet Union) Kosmos-3M		(Soviet Union) Plesetsk Site 132/2		(Soviet Union) RVSN	
4 June; 15:41	(Soviet Union) Kosmos 1275 (Parus)		Low Earth	Navigation	In orbit	Successful
9 June; 03:33	(Soviet Union) Molniya-M/ML		(Soviet Union) Plesetsk Site 41/1		(Soviet Union) RVSN	
9 June; 03:33	(Soviet Union) Molniya-3 No.30		Molniya	Communications	10 February 1998	Successful
12 June	(United States) LGM-30G Minuteman III		(United States) Vandenberg LF-09		(United States) US Air Force	
12 June	(United States)	US Air Force	Suborbital	Test flight	12 June	Successful
12 June	Apogee: 1,300 kilometres (810 mi)					
12 June	(United States) Castor I		(Marshall Islands) Roi-Namur		(United States) US Air Force	
12 June	(United States) DOT-4	US Air Force	Suborbital	Technology	12 June	Successful
12 June	Apogee: 303 kilometres (188 mi)					
16 June; 07:00	(Soviet Union) Soyuz-U		(Soviet Union) Plesetsk Site 43/3		(Soviet Union) RVSN	
16 June; 07:00	(Soviet Union) Kosmos 1276 (Zenit-4MKT No.18)		Low Earth	Optical imaging	29 June	Successful
17 June; 09:30	(Soviet Union) Soyuz-U		(Soviet Union) Baikonur Site 31/6		(Soviet Union) RVSN	
17 June; 09:30	(Soviet Union) Kosmos 1277 (Zenit-6U)		Low Earth	Optical imaging	1 July	Successful
19 June; 01:15	(United States) UGM-73 Poseidon C3		(United States) USS Lewis and Clark, Eastern Test Range		(United States) US Navy	
19 June; 01:15	(United States)	US Navy	Suborbital	Test flight	19 June	Successful
19 June; 01:15	Apogee: 500 kilometres (310 mi)					
19 June; 01:15	(United States) UGM-73 Poseidon C3		(United States) USS Lewis and Clark, Eastern Test Range		(United States) US Navy	
19 June; 01:15	(United States)	US Navy	Suborbital	Test flight	19 June	Successful
19 June; 01:15	Apogee: 500 kilometres (310 mi)					
19 June; 01:16	(United States) UGM-73 Poseidon C3		(United States) USS Lewis and Clark, Eastern Test Range		(United States) US Navy	
19 June; 01:16	(United States)	US Navy	Suborbital	Test flight	19 June	Successful
19 June; 01:16	Apogee: 500 kilometres (310 mi)					
19 June; 01:16	(United States) UGM-73 Poseidon C3		(United States) USS Lewis and Clark, Eastern Test Range		(United States) US Navy	
19 June; 01:16	(United States)	US Navy	Suborbital	Test flight	19 June	Successful
19 June; 01:16	Apogee: 500 kilometres (310 mi)					
19 June; 12:32:59	(France) Ariane 1		(France) Kourou ELA-1		(France) Arianespace	
19 June; 12:32:59	Meteosat 2	EUMETSAT	Geosynchronous	Weather	In orbit	Successful
19 June; 12:32:59	(India) APPLE	ISRO	Geosynchronous	Communications; Technology	In orbit	Successful
19 June; 12:32:59	CAT-3	European Space Agency	Geosynchronous transfer	Vehicle monitoring	In orbit	Successful
19 June; 19:37:04	(Soviet Union) Molniya-M/2BL		(Soviet Union) Plesetsk Site 43/3		(Soviet Union) RVSN	
19 June; 19:37:04	(Soviet Union) Kosmos 1278 (US-K)		Molniya	Missile defence	2 September 2000	Successful
23 June; 10:52:59	(United States) Atlas E/F Star-37S-ISS		(United States) Vandenberg SLC-3W		(United States) US Air Force	
23 June; 10:52:59	(United States) NOAA-7 (NOAA-C)	NOAA	Sun-synchronous	Weather	In orbit	Successful
24 June; 17:47	(Soviet Union) Molniya-M/ML		(Soviet Union) Plesetsk Site 43/3		(Soviet Union) RVSN	
24 June; 17:47	(Soviet Union) Molniya 1-50		Molniya	Communications	14 December 1991	Successful
25 June; 23:55	(Soviet Union) Proton-K/DM		(Soviet Union) Baikonur Site 200/40		(Soviet Union) RVSN	
25 June; 23:55	(Soviet Union) Ekran No.21L		Geostationary	Communications	In orbit	Successful
26 June	(United States) LGM-30G Minuteman III		(United States) Vandenberg LF-26		(United States) US Air Force	
26 June	(United States)	US Air Force	Suborbital	Test flight	26 June	Successful
26 June	Apogee: 1,300 kilometres (810 mi)					
June	(Soviet Union) MR-12		(Soviet Union) Professor Zubov, Atlantic Ocean		(Soviet Union)	
June	(Soviet Union)		Suborbital	Aeronomy		Successful
June	Apogee: 150 kilometres (93 mi)					
June	(Soviet Union) MR-12		(Soviet Union) Professor Zubov, Atlantic Ocean		(Soviet Union)	
June	(Soviet Union)		Suborbital	Aeronomy		Successful
June	Apogee: 150 kilometres (93 mi)					
June	(Soviet Union) MR-12		(Soviet Union) Professor Zubov, Atlantic Ocean		(Soviet Union)	
June	(Soviet Union)		Suborbital	Aeronomy		Successful
June	Apogee: 150 kilometres (93 mi)					
June	(Soviet Union) MR-12		(Soviet Union) Professor Zubov, Atlantic Ocean		(Soviet Union)	
June	(Soviet Union)		Suborbital	Aeronomy		Successful
June	Apogee: 150 kilometres (93 mi)					
June	(Soviet Union) R-17 Elbrus		(Iraq)		(Iraq)	
June	(Iraq)		Suborbital	Missile strike		Successful
June	Apogee: 100 kilometres (62 mi)					
June	(Soviet Union) R-17 Elbrus		(Iraq)		(Iraq)	
June	(Iraq)		Suborbital	Missile strike		Successful
June	Apogee: 100 kilometres (62 mi)					
June	(Soviet Union) R-17 Elbrus		(Iraq)		(Iraq)	
June	(Iraq)		Suborbital	Missile strike		Successful
June	Apogee: 100 kilometres (62 mi)					
=== July ===
1 July; 09:30	(Soviet Union) Soyuz-U		(Soviet Union) Baikonur Site 31/6		(Soviet Union) RVSN	
1 July; 09:30	(Soviet Union) Kosmos 1279 (Zenit-6U)		Low Earth	Optical imaging	15 July	Successful
2 July; 07:10	(Soviet Union) Soyuz-U		(Soviet Union) Plesetsk Site 43/3		(Soviet Union) RVSN	
2 July; 07:10	(Soviet Union) Kosmos 1280 (Resurs-F1 No.15L)		Low Earth	Optical imaging	16 July	Successful
7 July; 12:30	(Soviet Union) Soyuz-U		(Soviet Union) Plesetsk Site 43/3		(Soviet Union) RVSN	
7 July; 12:30	(Soviet Union) Kosmos 1281 (Zenit-6U)		Low Earth	Optical imaging	21 July	Successful
10 July; 05:14	(Soviet Union) Vostok-2M		(Soviet Union) Baikonur		(Soviet Union) RVSN	
10 July; 05:14	(Soviet Union) Meteor-Priroda 2-4		Sun-synchronous	Weather	In orbit	Successful
10 July; 05:14	(Soviet Union) Iskra 1		Sun-synchronous	Microgravity research	16 April 1990	Successful
11 July; 14:48	(United States) UGM-73 Poseidon C3		(United States) USS George C. Marshall, Eastern Test Range		(United States) US Navy	
11 July; 14:48	(United States)	US Navy	Suborbital	Test flight	11 July	Successful
11 July; 14:48	Apogee: 500 kilometres (310 mi)					
11 July; 14:48	(United States) UGM-73 Poseidon C3		(United States) USS George C. Marshall, Eastern Test Range		(United States) US Navy	
11 July; 14:48	(United States)	US Navy	Suborbital	Test flight	11 July	Successful
11 July; 14:48	Apogee: 500 kilometres (310 mi)					
11 July; 14:49	(United States) UGM-73 Poseidon C3		(United States) USS George C. Marshall, Eastern Test Range		(United States) US Navy	
11 July; 14:49	(United States)	US Navy	Suborbital	Test flight	11 July	Successful
11 July; 14:49	Apogee: 500 kilometres (310 mi)					
11 July; 14:49	(United States) UGM-73 Poseidon C3		(United States) USS George C. Marshall, Eastern Test Range		(United States) US Navy	
11 July; 14:49	(United States)	US Navy	Suborbital	Test flight	11 July	Successful
11 July; 14:49	Apogee: 500 kilometres (310 mi)					
15 July; 13:00	(Soviet Union) Soyuz-U		(Soviet Union) Baikonur Site 31/6		(Soviet Union) RVSN	
15 July; 13:00	(Soviet Union) Kosmos 1282 (Yantar-2K No.951)		Low Earth	Optical imaging	14 August	Successful
17 July; 08:00	(Soviet Union) Soyuz-U		(Soviet Union) Plesetsk Site 41/1		(Soviet Union) RVSN	
17 July; 08:00	(Soviet Union) Kosmos 1283 (Zenit-6U)		Low Earth	Optical imaging	31 July	Successful
29 July; 11:55	(Soviet Union) Soyuz-U		(Soviet Union) Plesetsk Site 41/1		(Soviet Union) RVSN	
29 July; 11:55	(Soviet Union) Kosmos 1284 (Zenit-6U)		Low Earth	Optical imaging	12 August	Successful
30 July; 21:38	(Soviet Union) Proton-K/DM		(Soviet Union) Baikonur Site 200/39		(Soviet Union) RVSN	
30 July; 21:38	(Soviet Union) Gran' No.19L		Geostationary	Communications	In orbit	Successful
30 July; 21:38	Operated until May 1986					
31 July; 10:50	(United States) Aries		(United States) White Sands LC-36		(United States) US Air Force	
31 July; 10:50	(United States)	US Air Force	Suborbital	Infrared astronomy	31 July	Successful
31 July; 10:50	Apogee: 395 kilometres (245 mi)					
July	(Soviet Union) MR-12		(Soviet Union) Professor Zubov, Atlantic Ocean		(Soviet Union)	
July	(Soviet Union)		Suborbital	Aeronomy		Successful
July	Apogee: 150 kilometres (93 mi)					
July	(Soviet Union) MR-12		(Soviet Union) Professor Zubov, Atlantic Ocean		(Soviet Union)	
July	(Soviet Union)		Suborbital	Aeronomy		Successful
July	Apogee: 150 kilometres (93 mi)					
July	(Soviet Union) MR-12		(Soviet Union) Professor Zubov, Atlantic Ocean		(Soviet Union)	
July	(Soviet Union)		Suborbital	Aeronomy		Successful
July	Apogee: 150 kilometres (93 mi)					
=== August ===
1 August; 22:00	(Japan) TT-500A		(Japan) Tanegashima LA-T		(Japan) NASDA	
1 August; 22:00	(Japan)	NASDA	Suborbital	Test flight	1 August	Successful
1 August; 22:00	Apogee: 320 kilometres (200 mi)					
3 August; 09:56	(United States) Delta 3913		(United States) Vandenberg SLC-2W		(United States) NASA	
3 August; 09:56	(United States) Dynamics Explorer 1 (Explorer 62)	NASA	Highly elliptical	Magnetospheric	In orbit	Partial launch failure
3 August; 09:56	(United States) Dynamics Explorer 2 (Explorer 63)	NASA	Low Earth	Magnetospheric	19 February 1983	Partial launch failure
3 August; 09:56	Both payloads deployed into low Earth orbit, with DE-1 raising itself into its operational orbit. Premature first-stage cutoff resulted in slightly lower orbit than had been planned, spacecraft were able to compensate and complete their missions.					
4 August; 00:13	(Soviet Union) Molniya-M/2BL		(Soviet Union) Plesetsk Site 16/2		(Soviet Union) RVSN	
4 August; 00:13	(Soviet Union) Kosmos 1285 (US-K)		Molniya	Missile defence	In orbit	Successful
4 August; 08:28	(Soviet Union) Tsyklon-2		(Soviet Union) Baikonur Site 90		(Soviet Union) RVSN	
4 August; 08:28	(Soviet Union) Kosmos 1286 (US-PM)		Low Earth	ELINT	16 October 1982	Successful
6 August; 08:16:00	(United States) Atlas SLV-3D Centaur-D1AR		(United States) Cape Canaveral LC-36A			
6 August; 08:16:00	(United States) FLTSATCOM 5	US Navy	Geosynchronous	Communications	In orbit	Launch failure
6 August; 08:16:00	Payload fairing collapsed during ascent, resulting in damage which left satellite unusable after arrival in geosynchronous orbit					
6 August; 11:49	(Soviet Union) Kosmos-3M		(Soviet Union) Plesetsk Site 132/2		(Soviet Union) RVSN	
6 August; 11:49	(Soviet Union) Kosmos 1287 (Strela-1M)		Low Earth	Communications	In orbit	Successful
6 August; 11:49	(Soviet Union) Kosmos 1288 (Strela-1M)		Low Earth	Communications	In orbit	Successful
6 August; 11:49	(Soviet Union) Kosmos 1289 (Strela-1M)		Low Earth	Communications	In orbit	Successful
6 August; 11:49	(Soviet Union) Kosmos 1290 (Strela-1M)		Low Earth	Communications	In orbit	Successful
6 August; 11:49	(Soviet Union) Kosmos 1291 (Strela-1M)		Low Earth	Communications	In orbit	Successful
6 August; 11:49	(Soviet Union) Kosmos 1292 (Strela-1M)		Low Earth	Communications	In orbit	Successful
6 August; 11:49	(Soviet Union) Kosmos 1293 (Strela-1M)		Low Earth	Communications	In orbit	Successful
6 August; 11:49	(Soviet Union) Kosmos 1294 (Strela-1M)		Low Earth	Communications	In orbit	Successful
7 August; 13:35	(Soviet Union) Vostok-2M		(Soviet Union) Plesetsk Site 43/3			
7 August; 13:35	Bulgaria 1300 (Interkosmos 22)	IKIT	Low Earth	Operational	In orbit	Successful
7 August; 13:35	First Bulgarian satellite, launched as part of the Interkosmos programme					
9 August	(United States) Taurus-Orion		(United States) Wallops		(United States) NASA	
9 August	(United States)	NASA	Suborbital	Plasma research	9 August	Successful
9 August	Apogee: 160 kilometres (99 mi)					
10 August; 20:03	(Japan) (United States) N-II		(Japan) Tanegashima Osaki		(Japan) NASDA	
10 August; 20:03	(Japan) Himawari 2	JMA	Geostationary	Weather	In orbit	Successful
10 August; 20:03	Operated until February 1988					
12 August; 05:46	(Soviet Union) Kosmos-3M		(Soviet Union) Plesetsk Site 132/2		(Soviet Union) RVSN	
12 August; 05:46	(Soviet Union) Kosmos 1295 (Parus)		Low Earth	Navigation	In orbit	Successful
13 August; 02:26	(United States) UGM-96 Trident I C4		(United States) USS John C. Calhoun, Eastern Test Range		(United States) US Navy	
13 August; 02:26	(United States)	US Navy	Suborbital	Test flight	13 August	Successful
13 August; 02:26	Apogee: 1,000 kilometres (620 mi)					
13 August; 02:46	(United States) UGM-96 Trident I C4		(United States) USS John C. Calhoun, Eastern Test Range		(United States) US Navy	
13 August; 02:46	(United States)	US Navy	Suborbital	Test flight	13 August	Successful
13 August; 02:46	Apogee: 1,000 kilometres (620 mi)					
13 August; 03:32	(United States) UGM-96 Trident I C4		(United States) USS John C. Calhoun, Eastern Test Range		(United States) US Navy	
13 August; 03:32	(United States)	US Navy	Suborbital	Test flight	13 August	Successful
13 August; 03:32	Apogee: 1,000 kilometres (620 mi)					
13 August; 03:32	(United States) UGM-96 Trident I C4		(United States) USS John C. Calhoun, Eastern Test Range		(United States) US Navy	
13 August; 03:32	(United States)	US Navy	Suborbital	Test flight	13 August	Successful
13 August; 03:32	Apogee: 1,000 kilometres (620 mi)					
13 August; 16:20	(Soviet Union) Soyuz-U		(Soviet Union) Plesetsk Site 41/1		(Soviet Union) RVSN	
13 August; 16:20	(Soviet Union) Kosmos 1296 (Yantar-2K No.943)		Low Earth	Optical imaging	13 September	Successful
14 August; 07:43	(Canada) Black Brant X		(United States) Wallops		(United States) NASA	
14 August; 07:43	(United States)	NASA	Suborbital	Test flight	14 August	Successful
14 August; 07:43	Apogee: 625 kilometres (388 mi)					
18 August; 09:30	(Soviet Union) Soyuz-U		(Soviet Union) Plesetsk Site 41/1		(Soviet Union) RVSN	
18 August; 09:30	(Soviet Union) Kosmos 1297 (Zenit-6U)		Low Earth	Optical imaging	30 August	Successful
18 August	(Soviet Union) R-36MUTTKh		(Soviet Union) Uzhur Site 2/2		(Soviet Union) RVSN	
18 August	(Soviet Union)	RVSN	Suborbital	Test flight	18 August	Successful
18 August	Apogee: 1,000 kilometres (620 mi)					
21 August; 10:20	(Soviet Union) Soyuz-U		(Soviet Union) Baikonur Site 1/5		(Soviet Union) RVSN	
21 August; 10:20	(Soviet Union) Kosmos 1298 (Yantar-4K2)		Low Earth	Optical imaging	2 October	Successful
22 August; 01:00	(United States) UGM-73 Poseidon C3		(United States) USS Nathanael Greene, Eastern Test Range		(United States) US Navy	
22 August; 01:00	(United States)	US Navy	Suborbital	Test flight	22 August	Successful
22 August; 01:00	Apogee: 500 kilometres (310 mi)					
24 August; 12:00	(Japan) S-310		(Japan) Kagoshima		(Japan) ISAS	
24 August; 12:00	(Japan)	ISAS	Suborbital	Aeronomy; Auroal research	24 August	Successful
24 August; 12:00	Apogee: 187 kilometres (116 mi)					
24 August; 16:37	(Soviet Union) Tsyklon-2		(Soviet Union) Baikonur Site 90		(Soviet Union) RVSN	
24 August; 16:37	(Soviet Union) Kosmos 1299 (US-A)		Low Earth	Radar imaging	27 September	
24 August; 16:37	Nuclear-powered satellite, reactor ejected at end of mission and remains in orbit					
24 August; 21:40	(Soviet Union) Tsyklon-3		(Soviet Union) Plesetsk Site 32/1		(Soviet Union) RVSN	
24 August; 21:40	(Soviet Union) Kosmos 1300 (Tselina-D)		Low Earth	ELINT	In orbit	Successful
25 August	(United States) Taurus-Orion		(United States) White Sands LC-36		(United States) NASA	
25 August	(United States)	NASA	Suborbital	Aeronomy	25 August	Successful
25 August	Apogee: 200 kilometres (120 mi)					
27 August; 10:30	(Soviet Union) Soyuz-U		(Soviet Union) Plesetsk Site 41/1		(Soviet Union) RVSN	
27 August; 10:30	(Soviet Union) Kosmos 1301 (Resurs-F1 No.16L)		Low Earth	Optical imaging	10 September	Successful
28 August; 00:03	(United States) UGM-96 Trident I C4		(United States) USS Simon Bolivar, Eastern Test Range		(United States) US Navy	
28 August; 00:03	(United States)	US Navy	Suborbital	Test flight	28 August	Successful
28 August; 00:03	Apogee: 1,000 kilometres (620 mi)					
28 August; 00:04	(United States) UGM-96 Trident I C4		(United States) USS Simon Bolivar, Eastern Test Range		(United States) US Navy	
28 August; 00:04	(United States)	US Navy	Suborbital	Test flight	28 August	Successful
28 August; 00:04	Apogee: 1,000 kilometres (620 mi)					
28 August; 00:04	(United States) UGM-96 Trident I C4		(United States) USS Simon Bolivar, Eastern Test Range		(United States) US Navy	
28 August; 00:04	(United States)	US Navy	Suborbital	Test flight	28 August	Successful
28 August; 00:04	Apogee: 1,000 kilometres (620 mi)					
28 August; 00:04	(United States) UGM-96 Trident I C4		(United States) USS Simon Bolivar, Eastern Test Range		(United States) US Navy	
28 August; 00:04	(United States)	US Navy	Suborbital	Test flight	28 August	Successful
28 August; 00:04	Apogee: 1,000 kilometres (620 mi)					
28 August; 02:40	(Soviet Union) R-5 Vertikal		(Soviet Union) Kapustin Yar		(Soviet Union)	
28 August; 02:40	(Soviet Union) Vertikal 9		Suborbital	Solar research	28 August	Successful
28 August; 02:40	Apogee: 500 kilometres (310 mi)					
28 August; 16:18	(Soviet Union) Kosmos-3M		(Soviet Union) Plesetsk Site 132/1		(Soviet Union) RVSN	
28 August; 16:18	(Soviet Union) Kosmos 1302 (Strela-2M)		Low Earth	Communications	In orbit	Successful
August	(Soviet Union) MR-12		(Soviet Union) Professor Zubov, Atlantic Ocean		(Soviet Union)	
August	(Soviet Union)		Suborbital	Aeronomy		Successful
August	Apogee: 150 kilometres (93 mi)					
August	(Soviet Union) MR-12		(Soviet Union) Professor Zubov, Atlantic Ocean		(Soviet Union)	
August	(Soviet Union)		Suborbital	Aeronomy		Successful
August	Apogee: 150 kilometres (93 mi)					
August	(Soviet Union) MR-12		(Soviet Union) Professor Zubov, Atlantic Ocean		(Soviet Union)	
August	(Soviet Union)		Suborbital	Aeronomy		Successful
August	Apogee: 150 kilometres (93 mi)					
August	(Soviet Union) MR-12		(Soviet Union) Professor Zubov, Atlantic Ocean		(Soviet Union)	
August	(Soviet Union)		Suborbital	Aeronomy		Successful
August	Apogee: 150 kilometres (93 mi)					
=== September ===
3 September; 18:29	(United States) Titan III(32)D		(United States) Vandenberg SLC-4E		(United States) US Air Force	
3 September; 18:29	(United States) OPS 3984 (KH-11)	NRO	Sun-synchronous	Optical imaging	23 November 1984	Successful
4 September; 08:00	(Soviet Union) Soyuz-U		(Soviet Union) Baikonur Site 31/6		(Soviet Union) RVSN	
4 September; 08:00	(Soviet Union) Kosmos 1303 (Zenit-6U)		Low Earth	Optical imaging	18 September	Successful
4 September; 11:06	(Soviet Union) Kosmos-3M		(Soviet Union) Plesetsk Site 132/1		(Soviet Union) RVSN	
4 September; 11:06	(Soviet Union) Kosmos 1304 (Tsikada)		Low Earth	Navigation	In orbit	Successful
5 September; 01:00	(Japan) S-520		(Japan) Kagoshima LA-K		(Japan) ISAS	
5 September; 01:00	(Japan)	ISAS	Suborbital	Technology	5 September	Successful
5 September; 01:00	Apogee: 224 kilometres (139 mi), payload recovered					
7 September; 09:38	(Japan) S-310		(Japan) Kagoshima		(Japan) ISAS	
7 September; 09:38	(Japan)	ISAS	Suborbital	Aeronomy	7 September	Successful
7 September; 09:38	Apogee: 193 kilometres (120 mi)					
8 September	(Soviet Union) UR-100N		(Soviet Union) Baikonur		(Soviet Union) RVSN	
8 September	(Soviet Union)	RVSN	Suborbital	Test flight	8 September	Launch failure
11 September; 08:43	(Soviet Union) Molniya-M/ML		(Soviet Union) Plesetsk Site 43/3		(Soviet Union) RVSN	
11 September; 08:43	(Soviet Union) Kosmos 1305 (Molniya-3 No.28)		Intended: Molniya; Achieved: Medium Earth	Communications	In orbit	Launch failure
11 September; 08:43	Placed into unusable, lower-than-planned, orbit due to upper stage malfunction					
12 September	(United States) LGM-30B Minuteman IB		(United States) Vandenberg LF-06		(United States) US Air Force	
12 September	(United States)	US Air Force	Suborbital	REV test	12 September	Successful
12 September	Apogee: 1,300 kilometres (810 mi)					
14 September; 20:31	(Soviet Union) Tsyklon-2		(Soviet Union) Baikonur Site 90		(Soviet Union) RVSN	
14 September; 20:31	(Soviet Union) Kosmos 1306 (US-PM)		Low Earth	ELINT	12 July 1982	Successful
15 September; 11:30	(Soviet Union) Soyuz-U		(Soviet Union) Plesetsk Site 43/3		(Soviet Union) RVSN	
15 September; 11:30	(Soviet Union) Kosmos 1307 (Zenit-6U)		Low Earth	Optical imaging	29 September	Successful
18 September; 03:34	(Soviet Union) Kosmos-3M		(Soviet Union) Plesetsk Site 132/1		(Soviet Union) RVSN	
18 September; 03:34	(Soviet Union) Kosmos 1308 (Parus)		Low Earth	Navigation	In orbit	Successful
18 September; 09:30	(Soviet Union) Soyuz-U		(Soviet Union) Plesetsk Site 43/3		(Soviet Union) RVSN	
18 September; 09:30	(Soviet Union) Kosmos 1309 (Zenit-4MT)		Low Earth	Optical imaging	1 October	Successful
18 September; 17:59:58	(Soviet Union) Vertikal-4		(Soviet Union) Kapustin Yar Site 107		(Soviet Union) RVSN	
18 September; 17:59:58	(Soviet Union)	RVSN	Suborbital	Plasma research	18 September	Successful
18 September; 17:59:58	Apogee: 1,514 kilometres (941 mi)					
19 September; 21:28:40	(China) Feng Bao 1		(China) Jiuquan LA-2B (Site 138)		(China)	
19 September; 21:28:40	(China) Shijian 2		Low Earth	Micrometeoroid research, electromagnetic background research	17 August 1982	Successful
19 September; 21:28:40	(China) Shijian 2A		Low Earth	Ionosphere research	6 October 1982	Successful
19 September; 21:28:40	(China) Shijian 2B		Low Earth	Radar calibration	26 September	Successful
19 September; 21:28:40	Final flight of the Feng Bao 1					
21 September; 13:10	(Soviet Union) Tsyklon-3		(Soviet Union) Plesetsk Site 32/1		(Soviet Union)	
21 September; 13:10	(Soviet Union) (France) Oreol 3		Low Earth	Magnetospheric research	In orbit	Successful
22 September; 16:15	(United States) MGM-31A Pershing		(United States) Fort Bliss		United States Army	
22 September; 16:15	(United States)	US Army	Suborbital	Test flight	22 September	Successful
22 September; 16:15	Apogee: 180 kilometres (110 mi)					
22 September; 16:48	(United States) MGM-31A Pershing		(United States) Fort Bliss		(United States) US Army	
22 September; 16:48	(United States)	US Army	Suborbital	Test flight	22 September	Successful
22 September; 16:48	Apogee: 180 kilometres (110 mi)					
23 September; 08:00	(Soviet Union) Kosmos-3M		(Soviet Union) Plesetsk Site 132/2		(Soviet Union) RVSN	
23 September; 08:00	(Soviet Union) Kosmos 1310 (Taifun-1)		Low Earth	Radar calibration	3 April 1989	Successful
24 September; 23:09	(United States) Delta 3910/PAM-D		(United States) Cape Canaveral LC-17A		(United States) NASA	
24 September; 23:09	(United States) SBS-2	SBS	Geosynchronous	Communications	In orbit	Successful
24 September; 23:09	Operated until September 1996					
28 September; 21:00	(Soviet Union) Kosmos-3M		(Soviet Union) Plesetsk Site 132/2		(Soviet Union) RVSN	
28 September; 21:00	(Soviet Union) Kosmos 1311 (Taifun-2)		Low Earth	Radar calibration	28 August 1983	Successful
28 September; 21:00	(Soviet Union) Kosmos 1311 Subsatellite 1		Low Earth	Radar calibration	27 February 1982	Successful
28 September; 21:00	(Soviet Union) Kosmos 1311 Subsatellite 2		Low Earth	Radar calibration	26 February 1982	Successful
28 September; 21:00	(Soviet Union) Kosmos 1311 Subsatellite 3		Low Earth	Radar calibration	5 December 1982	Successful
28 September; 21:00	(Soviet Union) Kosmos 1311 Subsatellite 4		Low Earth	Radar calibration	5 December 1982	Successful
28 September; 21:00	(Soviet Union) Kosmos 1311 Subsatellite 5		Low Earth	Radar calibration	17 December 1982	Successful
28 September; 21:00	(Soviet Union) Kosmos 1311 Subsatellite 6		Low Earth	Radar calibration	16 December 1982	Successful
28 September; 21:00	(Soviet Union) Kosmos 1311 Subsatellite 7		Low Earth	Radar calibration	22 December 1982	Successful
28 September; 21:00	(Soviet Union) Kosmos 1311 Subsatellite 8		Low Earth	Radar calibration	23 December 1982	Successful
28 September; 21:00	(Soviet Union) Kosmos 1311 Subsatellite 9		Low Earth	Radar calibration	24 December 1982	Successful
28 September; 21:00	(Soviet Union) Kosmos 1311 Subsatellite 10		Low Earth	Radar calibration	18 December 1982	Successful
28 September; 21:00	(Soviet Union) Kosmos 1311 Subsatellite 11		Low Earth	Radar calibration	17 December 1982	Successful
28 September; 21:00	(Soviet Union) Kosmos 1311 Subsatellite 12		Low Earth	Radar calibration	17 December 1982	Successful
28 September; 21:00	(Soviet Union) Kosmos 1311 Subsatellite 13		Low Earth	Radar calibration	16 December 1982	Successful
28 September; 21:00	(Soviet Union) Kosmos 1311 Subsatellite 14		Low Earth	Radar calibration	31 December 1982	Successful
28 September; 21:00	(Soviet Union) Kosmos 1311 Subsatellite 15		Low Earth	Radar calibration	31 December 1982	Successful
28 September; 21:00	(Soviet Union) Kosmos 1311 Subsatellite 16		Low Earth	Radar calibration	31 December 1982	Successful
28 September; 21:00	(Soviet Union) Kosmos 1311 Subsatellite 17		Low Earth	Radar calibration	28 February 1983	Successful
28 September; 21:00	(Soviet Union) Kosmos 1311 Subsatellite 18		Low Earth	Radar calibration	28 February 1983	Successful
28 September; 21:00	(Soviet Union) Kosmos 1311 Subsatellite 19		Low Earth	Radar calibration	28 February 1983	Successful
28 September; 21:00	(Soviet Union) Kosmos 1311 Subsatellite 20		Low Earth	Radar calibration	28 February 1983	Successful
28 September; 21:00	(Soviet Union) Kosmos 1311 Subsatellite 21		Low Earth	Radar calibration	28 February 1983	Successful
28 September; 21:00	(Soviet Union) Kosmos 1311 Subsatellite 22		Low Earth	Radar calibration	28 February 1983	Successful
28 September; 21:00	(Soviet Union) Kosmos 1311 Subsatellite 23		Low Earth	Radar calibration	28 February 1983	Successful
28 September; 21:00	(Soviet Union) Kosmos 1311 Subsatellite 24		Low Earth	Radar calibration	28 February 1983	Successful
29 September	(Soviet Union) RT-2PM Topol		(Soviet Union) Plesetsk Site 167		(Soviet Union) RVSN	
29 September	(Soviet Union)	RVSN	Suborbital	Test flight	29 September	Successful
29 September	Maiden flight of Topol missile, apogee: 1,000 kilometres (620 mi)					
29 September	(United States) MGM-31A Pershing		(United States) Fort Bliss		(United States) US Army	
29 September	(United States)	US Army	Suborbital	Test flight	29 September	Unknown
29 September	Apogee: 180 kilometres (110 mi)					
29 September	(United States) MGM-31A Pershing		(United States) Fort Bliss		(United States) US Army	
29 September	(United States)	US Army	Suborbital	Test flight	29 September	Unknown
29 September	Apogee: 180 kilometres (110 mi)					
30 September; 08:00	(Soviet Union) Tsyklon-3		(Soviet Union) Plesetsk Site 32/1		(Soviet Union) RVSN	
30 September; 08:00	(Soviet Union) Kosmos 1312 (Musson No.12)		Low Earth	Geodesy	In orbit	Successful
30 September; 23:20:00	(Canada) Black Brant VIII-C		(Sweden) Esrange		(Sweden) SSC	
30 September; 23:20:00	(Sweden)	SSC	Suborbital	Infrared astronomy	30 September	Successful
30 September; 23:20:00	Apogee: 270 kilometres (170 mi)					
30 September	(Canada) Black Brant VC		(United States) White Sands LC-36		(United States) NASA	
30 September	(United States)	NASA	Suborbital	Solar research	30 September	Successful
30 September	Apogee: 243 kilometres (151 mi)					
=== October ===
1 October; 09:00	(Soviet Union) Soyuz-U		(Soviet Union) Baikonur Site 31/6		(Soviet Union) RVSN	
1 October; 09:00	(Soviet Union) Kosmos 1313 (Zenit-6U)		Low Earth	Optical imaging	15 October	Successful
4 October	(United States) LGM-30B Minuteman IB		(United States) Vandenberg LF-03		(United States) US Air Force	
4 October	(United States)	US Air Force	Suborbital	REV test	4 October	Successful
4 October	Apogee: 1,300 kilometres (810 mi)					
6 October; 11:27	(United States) Delta 2310		(United States) Vandenberg SLC-2W		(United States) NASA	
6 October; 11:27	(United States) Solar Mesosphere Explorer (Explorer 64)	NASA	Sun-synchronous	Atmospheric research	5 March 1991	Successful
6 October; 11:27	(United Kingdom) UoSAT-1	Surrey	Sun-synchronous	Technology; Amateur radio	13 October 1989	Successful
9 October; 10:40	(Soviet Union) Soyuz-U		(Soviet Union) Plesetsk Site 41/1		(Soviet Union) RVSN	
9 October; 10:40	(Soviet Union) Kosmos 1314 (Zenit-4MKT)		Low Earth	Optical imaging	22 October	Successful
9 October; 16:59	(Soviet Union) Proton-K/DM		(Soviet Union) Baikonur Site 200/39		(Soviet Union) RVSN	
9 October; 16:59	(Soviet Union) Gran' No.20L		Geostationary	Communications	In orbit	Successful
13 October; 23:01	(Soviet Union) Vostok-2M		(Soviet Union) Plesetsk Site 43/3		(Soviet Union) RVSN	
13 October; 23:01	(Soviet Union) Kosmos 1315 (Tselina-D)		Low Earth	ELINT	In orbit	Successful
13 October	(United States) MGM-31A Pershing		(United States) Fort Bliss		(United States) US Army	
13 October	(United States)	US Army	Suborbital	Test flight	13 October	Successful
13 October	Apogee: 180 kilometres (110 mi)					
13 October	(United States) MGM-31A Pershing		(United States) Fort Bliss		(United States) US Army	
13 October	(United States)	US Army	Suborbital	Test flight	13 October	Successful
13 October	Apogee: 180 kilometres (110 mi)					
14 October; 05:47	(United States) Nike-Orion		(United States) Wallops		(United States) NASA	
14 October; 05:47	(United States)	NASA	Suborbital	Plasma research	14 October	Successful
14 October; 05:47	Apogee: 197 kilometres (122 mi)					
15 October; 09:15	(Soviet Union) Soyuz-U		(Soviet Union) Baikonur Site 31/6		(Soviet Union) RVSN	
15 October; 09:15	(Soviet Union) Kosmos 1316 (Zenit-6U)		Low Earth	Optical imaging	29 October	Successful
16 October	(United States) Nike-Tomahawk		(United States) White Sands		(United States) NASA	
16 October	(United States)	NASA	Suborbital	Aeronomy	16 October	Successful
16 October	Apogee: 270 kilometres (170 mi)					
17 October; 05:59	(Soviet Union) Molniya-M/ML		(Soviet Union) Plesetsk Site 41/1		(Soviet Union) RVSN	
17 October; 05:59	(Soviet Union) Molniya-3 No.31		Molniya	Communications	9 January 1997	Successful
17 October	(United States) Astrobee-F		(United States) White Sands		(United States) NASA	
17 October	(United States)	NASA	Suborbital	X-ray astronomy	17 October	Successful
17 October	Apogee: 200 kilometres (120 mi)					
21 October	(United States) MGM-31A Pershing		(United States) Fort Bliss		(United States) US Army	
21 October	(United States)	US Army	Suborbital	Test flight	21 October	Successful
21 October	Apogee: 180 kilometres (110 mi)					
21 October	(United States) MGM-31A Pershing		(United States) Fort Bliss		(United States) US Army	
21 October	(United States)	US Army	Suborbital	Test flight	21 October	Unknown
21 October	Apogee: 180 kilometres (110 mi)					
25 October; 19:01:00	(United States) Nike-Tomahawk		(Norway) Andøya		(Norway) NDRE	
25 October; 19:01:00	(Norway)	NDRE	Suborbital	Auroral research	25 October	Successful
25 October; 19:01:00	Apogee: 184 kilometres (114 mi)					
30 October; 06:04	(Soviet Union) Proton-K/D-1		(Soviet Union) Baikonur Site 200/40		(Soviet Union) RVSN	
30 October; 06:04	(Soviet Union) Venera 13		Heliocentric	Venus lander	1 March 1982; 03:20	Successful
31 October; 09:22:00	(United States) Titan III(23)C		(United States) Cape Canaveral LC-40		(United States) US Air Force	
31 October; 09:22:00	(United States) OPS 4029 (Vortex)	NRO	High Earth	SIGINT	In orbit	Successful
31 October; 22:54	(Soviet Union) Molniya-M/2BL		(Soviet Union) Plesetsk Site 16/2		(Soviet Union) RVSN	
31 October; 22:54	(Soviet Union) Kosmos 1317 (US-K)		Molniya	Missile defence	In orbit	Successful
=== November ===
3 November; 13:00	(Soviet Union) Soyuz-U		(Soviet Union) Plesetsk Site 41/1		(Soviet Union) RVSN	
3 November; 13:00	(Soviet Union) Kosmos 1318 (Yantar-2K No.944)		Low Earth	Optical imaging	4 December	Successful
4 November; 05:31	(Soviet Union) Proton-K/D-1		(Soviet Union) Baikonur Site 200/39		(Soviet Union) RVSN	
4 November; 05:31	(Soviet Union) Venera 14		Heliocentric	Venus lander	5 March 1982	Partial spacecraft failure
4 November; 05:31	Surface sampler failed due to ejection of camera lens cap into its path					
7 November; 12:03:40	(United States) MGM-29 Sergeant		(United States) Poker Flat		(United States) US Air Force	
7 November; 12:03:40	(United States)	US Air Force	Suborbital	Auroral research	7 November	Successful
7 November; 12:03:40	Apogee: 130 kilometres (81 mi)					
9 November	(United States) Taurus-Orion		(United States) White Sands LC-36		(United States) NASA	
9 November	(United States)	NASA	Suborbital	Aeronomy	9 November	Successful
9 November	Apogee: 200 kilometres (120 mi)					
12 November; 15:10:00	(United States) Space Shuttle Columbia		(United States) Kennedy LC-39A		(United States) NASA	
12 November; 15:10:00	(United States) STS-2	NASA	Low Earth	Test flight	14 November	Partial spacecraft failure
12 November; 15:10:00	(United States) DFI	NASA	Low Earth (Columbia)	Vehicle monitoring	Unknown	Successful
12 November; 15:10:00	(United States) OFTP		Low Earth (Columbia)	Remote sensing	Successful	
12 November; 15:10:00	(United States) OSTA-1		Low Earth (Columbia)	Technology	Successful	
12 November; 15:10:00	Crewed flight with two astronauts, first spacecraft to make two orbital flights. Mission truncated due to fuel cell failure					
13 November; 09:30	(Soviet Union) Soyuz-U		(Soviet Union) Baikonur Site 31/6		(Soviet Union) RVSN	
13 November; 09:30	(Soviet Union) Kosmos 1319 (Zenit-6U)		Low Earth	Optical imaging	27 November	Successful
15 November; 17:50	(United States) UGM-96 Trident I C4		(United States) USS Benjamin Franklin, Eastern Test Range		(United States) US Navy	
15 November; 17:50	(United States)	US Navy	Suborbital	Test flight	15 November	Launch failure
15 November; 17:50	Apogee: 20 kilometres (12 mi), failed to reach space					
17 November; 15:25	(Soviet Union) Molniya-M/ML		(Soviet Union) Plesetsk Site 41/1		(Soviet Union) RVSN	
17 November; 15:25	(Soviet Union) Molniya 1-51		Molniya	Communications	2 November 1993	Successful
17 November	(Canada) Black Brant VIII-B		(United States) White Sands		(United States) NASA	
17 November	(United States)	NASA	Suborbital	X-ray astronomy	17 November	Successful
17 November	Apogee: 253 kilometres (157 mi)					
17 November	(Canada) Black Brant VIII-B		(United States) White Sands		(United States) NASA	
17 November	(United States)	NASA	Suborbital	X-ray astronomy	17 November	Successful
17 November	Apogee: 253 kilometres (157 mi)					
20 November; 01:37	(United States) Delta 3910/PAM-D		(United States) Cape Canaveral LC-17A		(United States) NASA	
20 November; 01:37	(United States) Satcom 3R	RCA Satcom	Geostationary	Communications	In orbit	Successful
20 November; 01:37	Decommissioned on 10 April 1991					
20 November; 08:30	(Soviet Union) Kosmos-3M		(Soviet Union) Kapustin Yar Site 107/2		(Soviet Union)	
20 November; 08:30	(India) Bhaskara 2	ISRO	Low Earth	Remote sensing	30 November 1991	Successful
23 November; 18:35	(Canada) Black Brant VIII-C		(United States) White Sands		(United States) NASA	
23 November; 18:35	(United States)	NASA	Suborbital	Solar research	23 November	Successful
23 November; 18:35	Apogee: 322 kilometres (200 mi)					
24 November	(United States) LGM-30G Minuteman III		(United States) Vandenberg LF-09		(United States) US Air Force	
24 November	(United States)	US Air Force	Suborbital	Test flight	24 November	Successful
24 November	Apogee: 1,300 kilometres (810 mi)					
27 November	(Soviet Union) R-39 Rif		(Soviet Union) Nenoksa		(Soviet Union) RVSN	
27 November	(Soviet Union)	RVSN	Suborbital	Test flight	27 November	Successful
27 November	Apogee: 1,000 kilometres (620 mi)					
28 November; 18:08	(Soviet Union) Kosmos-3M		(Soviet Union) Plesetsk Site 132/2		(Soviet Union) RVSN	
28 November; 18:08	(Soviet Union) Kosmos 1320 (Strela-1M)		Low Earth	Communications	In orbit	Successful
28 November; 18:08	(Soviet Union) Kosmos 1321 (Strela-1M)		Low Earth	Communications	In orbit	Successful
28 November; 18:08	(Soviet Union) Kosmos 1322 (Strela-1M)		Low Earth	Communications	In orbit	Successful
28 November; 18:08	(Soviet Union) Kosmos 1323 (Strela-1M)		Low Earth	Communications	In orbit	Successful
28 November; 18:08	(Soviet Union) Kosmos 1324 (Strela-1M)		Low Earth	Communications	In orbit	Successful
28 November; 18:08	(Soviet Union) Kosmos 1325 (Strela-1M)		Low Earth	Communications	In orbit	Successful
28 November; 18:08	(Soviet Union) Kosmos 1326 (Strela-1M)		Low Earth	Communications	In orbit	Successful
28 November; 18:08	(Soviet Union) Kosmos 1327 (Strela-1M)		Low Earth	Communications	In orbit	Successful
November	(Soviet Union) R-17 Elbrus		(Iraq)		(Iraq)	
November	(Iraq)		Suborbital	Missile strike		Successful
November	Apogee: 100 kilometres (62 mi)					
November	(Soviet Union) R-17 Elbrus		(Iraq)		(Iraq)	
November	(Iraq)		Suborbital	Missile strike		Successful
November	Apogee: 100 kilometres (62 mi)					
=== December ===
1 December; 01:38	(Canada) Black Brant X		(Canada) Cape Parry		(United States) NASA	
1 December; 01:38	(United States)	NASA	Suborbital	Plasma research	1 December	Successful
1 December; 01:38	Apogee: 612 kilometres (380 mi)					
1 December; 15:50:00	(United Kingdom) Petrel 1		(Sweden) Esrange		(United Kingdom) SRC	
1 December; 15:50:00	(United Kingdom)	SRC	Suborbital	Aeronomy	1 December	Successful
1 December; 15:50:00	Apogee: 187 kilometres (116 mi)					
3 December; 11:47	(Soviet Union) Tsyklon-3		(Soviet Union) Plesetsk Site 32/1		(Soviet Union) RVSN	
3 December; 11:47	(Soviet Union) Kosmos 1328 (Tselina-D)		Low Earth	ELINT	In orbit	Successful
4 December; 09:50	(Soviet Union) Soyuz-U		(Soviet Union) Baikonur Site 31/6		(Soviet Union) RVSN	
4 December; 09:50	(Soviet Union) Kosmos 1329 (Zenit-6U)		Low Earth	Optical imaging	18 December	Successful
6 December; 23:14:58	(Canada) Black Brant IVB		(Canada) Cape Parry		(Canada) NRC	
6 December; 23:14:58	(Canada)	NRC	Suborbital	Auroral research	6 December	Successful
6 December; 23:14:58	Apogee: 615 kilometres (382 mi)					
7 December; 00:00:40	(United States) Terrier-Malemute		(Canada) Cape Parry		(United States) NASA	
7 December; 00:00:40	(United States)	NASA	Suborbital	Plasma research	7 December	Successful
7 December; 00:00:40	Apogee: 451 kilometres (280 mi)					
7 December	(China) Dongfeng 5		(China) Jiuquan LA-2/138		(China)	
7 December	(China)		Suborbital	Test flight	7 December	Successful
7 December	Apogee: 1,000 kilometres (620 mi)					
8 December	(United States) Aerobee-150		(United States) White Sands LC-35		(United States) NASA	
8 December	(United States)	NASA	Suborbital	Magnetospheric research	8 December	Successful
8 December	Apogee: 200 kilometres (120 mi)					
9 December; 17:17:00	(United Kingdom) Petrel 2		(Sweden) Esrange		(United Kingdom) SRC	
9 December; 17:17:00	(United Kingdom)	SRC	Suborbital	Aeronomy	9 December	Successful
9 December; 17:17:00	Apogee: 188 kilometres (117 mi)					
9 December; 21:25:35	(United Kingdom) Skylark 7		(Sweden) Esrange		(West Germany) DFVLR	
9 December; 21:25:35	(West Germany)	DFVLR	Suborbital	Ionospheric research	9 December	Successful
9 December; 21:25:35	Apogee: 237 kilometres (147 mi)					
9 December	(United States) LGM-30G Minuteman III		(United States) Vandenberg LF-26		(United States) US Air Force	
9 December	(United States)	US Air Force	Suborbital	Test flight	9 December	Successful
9 December	Apogee: 1,300 kilometres (810 mi)					
10 December	(Brazil) Sonda 3		(Brazil) Barreira do Inferno		(Brazil) IAE	
10 December	(Brazil)	IAE	Suborbital	Ionospheric research	10 December	Successful
10 December	Apogee: 239 kilometres (149 mi)					
13 December; 21:31:38	(Canada) Black Brant IVB		(Canada) Cape Parry		(Canada) NRC	
13 December; 21:31:38	(Canada)	NRC	Suborbital	Auroral research	13 December	Launch failure
13 December; 21:31:38	Apogee: 50 kilometres (31 mi), failed to reach space					
13 December; 22:54:25	(Canada) Black Brant X		(Canada) Cape Parry		(United States) NASA	
13 December; 22:54:25	(United States)	NASA	Suborbital	Plasma research	13 December	Successful
13 December; 22:54:25	Apogee: 662 kilometres (411 mi)					
15 December; 23:35	(United States) Atlas SLV-3D Centaur-D1AR		(United States) Cape Canaveral LC-36A		(United States) NASA	
15 December; 23:35	(United Nations) Intelsat V F-3	Intelsat	Geostationary	Communications	In orbit	Successful
16 December; 14:10:00	(United Kingdom) Petrel 1		(Sweden) Esrange		(United Kingdom) SRC	
16 December; 14:10:00	(United Kingdom)	SRC	Suborbital	Aeronomy	16 December	Successful
16 December; 14:10:00	Apogee: 187 kilometres (116 mi)					
17 December; 11:00	(Soviet Union) Kosmos-3M		(Soviet Union) Plesetsk Site 132/2		(Soviet Union) RVSN	
17 December; 11:00	(Soviet Union) Radio Sputnik 3		Low Earth	Amateur radio	In orbit	Successful
17 December; 11:00	(Soviet Union) Radio Sputnik 4		Low Earth	Amateur radio	In orbit	Successful
17 December; 11:00	(Soviet Union) Radio Sputnik 5		Low Earth	Amateur radio	In orbit	Successful
17 December; 11:00	(Soviet Union) Radio Sputnik 6		Low Earth	Amateur radio	In orbit	Successful
17 December; 11:00	(Soviet Union) Radio Sputnik 7		Low Earth	Amateur radio	In orbit	Successful
17 December; 11:00	(Soviet Union) Radio Sputnik 8		Low Earth	Amateur radio	In orbit	Successful
19 December; 01:10	(United States) Atlas E/F SVS-1		(United States) Vandenberg SLC-3E		(United States) US Air Force	
19 December; 01:10	(United States) Navstar 7	US Air Force	Intended: Medium Earth	Navigation	+20 seconds	Launch failure
19 December; 01:10	Incorrect repair to booster unit engine resulted in coolant line blockage. Rocket lost thrust within eight seconds of launch, destroyed by range safety.					
19 December; 11:50	(Soviet Union) Soyuz-U		(Soviet Union) Baikonur Site 31/6		(Soviet Union) RVSN	
19 December; 11:50	(Soviet Union) Kosmos 1330 (Yantar-2K No.952)		Low Earth	Optical imaging	19 January 1982	Successful
19 December; 20:00	(United Kingdom) Petrel 1		(Spain) El Arenosillo		(Spain) INTA	
19 December; 20:00	(Spain)	INTA	Suborbital	Aeronomy	19 December	Successful
19 December; 20:00	Apogee: 106 kilometres (66 mi)					
20 December; 01:29:00	(France) Ariane 1		(France) Kourou ELA-1		(France) Arianespace	
20 December; 01:29:00	(United Nations) MARECS-1	Inmarsat	Geosynchronous	Communications	In orbit	Successful
20 December; 01:29:00	CAT-4 (Thesee)	ESA	Geosynchronous transfer	Vehicle monitoring Technology	In orbit	Successful
21 December; 18:37	(Soviet Union) Vertikal-4		(Soviet Union) Kapustin Yar Site 107		(Soviet Union) RVSN	
21 December; 18:37	(Soviet Union) Vertikal-10	RVSN	Suborbital	Aeronomy; Ionospheric research	21 December	Successful
21 December; 18:37	Apogee: 1,500 kilometres (930 mi)					
22 December	(Soviet Union) R-39 Rif		(Soviet Union) Nenoksa		(Soviet Union) RVSN	
22 December	(Soviet Union)	RVSN	Suborbital	Test flight	22 December	Successful
22 December	Apogee: 1,000 kilometres (620 mi)					
23 December; 13:15	(Soviet Union) Molniya-M/ML		(Soviet Union) Baikonur Site 1/5		(Soviet Union) RVSN	
23 December; 13:15	(Soviet Union) Molniya-1 No.55		Molniya	Communications	In orbit	Successful
27 December	(Soviet Union) R-39 Rif		(Soviet Union) Nenoksa		(Soviet Union) RVSN	
27 December	(Soviet Union)	RVSN	Suborbital	Test flight	27 December	Successful
27 December	Apogee: 1,000 kilometres (620 mi)					
December	(Soviet Union) R-17 Elbrus		(Iraq)		(Iraq)	
December	(Iraq)		Suborbital	Missile strike		Successful
December	Apogee: 100 kilometres (62 mi)					
December	(Soviet Union) R-17 Elbrus		(Iraq)		(Iraq)	
December	(Iraq)		Suborbital	Missile strike		Successful
December	Apogee: 100 kilometres (62 mi)					
=== Unknown date ===
Unknown	(Soviet Union) Perimetr		(Soviet Union) Baikonur		(Soviet Union) RVSN	
Unknown	(Soviet Union)	RVSN	Suborbital	Test flight	Unknown	Successful
Unknown	Apogee: 1,000 kilometres (620 mi)					
Unknown	(France) M4		(France) Biscarosse		(France) DGA	
Unknown	(France)	DGA	Suborbital	Test flight	Unknown	Successful
Unknown	Apogee: 800 kilometres (500 mi)					
Unknown	(France) M4		(France) Biscarosse		(France) DGA	
Unknown	(France)	DGA	Suborbital	Test flight	Unknown	Successful
Unknown	Apogee: 800 kilometres (500 mi)					
Unknown	(France) M4		(France) Biscarosse		(France) DGA	
Unknown	(France)	DGA	Suborbital	Test flight	Unknown	Successful
Unknown	Apogee: 800 kilometres (500 mi)					
Unknown	(France) M4		(France) Biscarosse		(France) DGA	
Unknown	(France)	DGA	Suborbital	Test flight	Unknown	Launch failure
Unknown	(Soviet Union) Kosmos-3MR		(Soviet Union) Kapustin Yar Site 107		(Soviet Union) RVSN	
Unknown	(Soviet Union)	RVSN	Suborbital	REV test	Unknown	Unknown
Unknown	Apogee: 675 kilometres (419 mi)					
Unknown	(Soviet Union) Kosmos-3MR		(Soviet Union) Kapustin Yar Site 107		(Soviet Union) RVSN	
Unknown	(Soviet Union)	RVSN	Suborbital	REV test	Unknown	Unknown
Unknown	Apogee: 675 kilometres (419 mi)					
Unknown	(Soviet Union) Kosmos-3MR		(Soviet Union) Kapustin Yar Site 107		(Soviet Union) RVSN	
Unknown	(Soviet Union)	RVSN	Suborbital	REV test	Unknown	Unknown
Unknown	Apogee: 675 kilometres (419 mi)					
Unknown	(Soviet Union) Kosmos-3MR		(Soviet Union) Kapustin Yar Site 107		(Soviet Union) RVSN	
Unknown	(Soviet Union)	RVSN	Suborbital	REV test	Unknown	Unknown
Unknown	Apogee: 675 kilometres (419 mi)					
Unknown	(Soviet Union) Kosmos-3MR		(Soviet Union) Kapustin Yar Site 107		(Soviet Union) RVSN	
Unknown	(Soviet Union)	RVSN	Suborbital	REV test	Unknown	Unknown
Unknown	Apogee: 675 kilometres (419 mi)					
Unknown	(Soviet Union) Kosmos-3MR		(Soviet Union) Kapustin Yar Site 107		(Soviet Union) RVSN	
Unknown	(Soviet Union)	RVSN	Suborbital	REV test	Unknown	Unknown
Unknown	Apogee: 675 kilometres (419 mi)					
Unknown	(Soviet Union) Kosmos-3MR		(Soviet Union) Kapustin Yar Site 107		(Soviet Union) RVSN	
Unknown	(Soviet Union)	RVSN	Suborbital	REV test	Unknown	Unknown
Unknown	Apogee: 675 kilometres (419 mi)					
Unknown	(Soviet Union) Kosmos-3MR		(Soviet Union) Kapustin Yar Site 107		(Soviet Union) RVSN	
Unknown	(Soviet Union)	RVSN	Suborbital	REV test	Unknown	Unknown
Unknown	Apogee: 675 kilometres (419 mi)					
Unknown	(Soviet Union) Kosmos-3MR		(Soviet Union) Kapustin Yar Site 107		(Soviet Union) RVSN	
Unknown	(Soviet Union)	RVSN	Suborbital	REV test	Unknown	Unknown
Unknown	Apogee: 675 kilometres (419 mi)					
Unknown	(Soviet Union) Kosmos-3MR		(Soviet Union) Kapustin Yar Site 107		(Soviet Union) RVSN	
Unknown	(Soviet Union)	RVSN	Suborbital	REV test	Unknown	Unknown
Unknown	Apogee: 675 kilometres (419 mi)					
Unknown	(Soviet Union) Kosmos-3MR		(Soviet Union) Kapustin Yar Site 107		(Soviet Union) RVSN	
Unknown	(Soviet Union)	RVSN	Suborbital	REV test	Unknown	Unknown
Unknown	Apogee: 675 kilometres (419 mi)					
Unknown	(Soviet Union) Kosmos-3MR		(Soviet Union) Kapustin Yar Site 107		(Soviet Union) RVSN	
Unknown	(Soviet Union)	RVSN	Suborbital	REV test	Unknown	Unknown
Unknown	Apogee: 675 kilometres (419 mi)					
Unknown	(Soviet Union) Vertikal-4		(Soviet Union) Kapustin Yar Site 107		(Soviet Union) RVSN	
Unknown	(Soviet Union)	RVSN	Suborbital	Ionospheric research	Unknown	Unknown
Unknown	Apogee: 1,500 kilometres (930 mi)					
Unknown	(Soviet Union) R-27 Zyb		(Soviet Union) Submarine, Okhotsk		(Soviet Union) RVSN	
Unknown	(Soviet Union)	RVSN	Suborbital	Test flight	Unknown	Successful
Unknown	Apogee: 620 kilometres (390 mi)					
Unknown	(Soviet Union) R-27 Zyb		(Soviet Union) Submarine, Okhotsk		(Soviet Union) RVSN	
Unknown	(Soviet Union)	RVSN	Suborbital	Test flight	Unknown	Successful
Unknown	Apogee: 620 kilometres (390 mi)					
Unknown	(Soviet Union) R-27 Zyb		(Soviet Union) Submarine, Okhotsk		(Soviet Union) RVSN	
Unknown	(Soviet Union)	RVSN	Suborbital	Test flight	Unknown	Successful
Unknown	Apogee: 620 kilometres (390 mi)					
Unknown	(Soviet Union) R-27 Zyb		(Soviet Union) Submarine, Okhotsk		(Soviet Union) RVSN	
Unknown	(Soviet Union)	RVSN	Suborbital	Test flight	Unknown	Successful
Unknown	Apogee: 620 kilometres (390 mi)					
Unknown	(Soviet Union) R-27 Zyb		(Soviet Union) Submarine, Okhotsk		(Soviet Union) RVSN	
Unknown	(Soviet Union)	RVSN	Suborbital	Test flight	Unknown	Successful
Unknown	Apogee: 620 kilometres (390 mi)					
Unknown	(Soviet Union) R-27 Zyb		(Soviet Union) Submarine, Okhotsk		(Soviet Union) RVSN	
Unknown	(Soviet Union)	RVSN	Suborbital	Test flight	Unknown	Successful
Unknown	Apogee: 620 kilometres (390 mi)					
Unknown	(Soviet Union) R-27 Zyb		(Soviet Union) Submarine, Okhotsk		(Soviet Union) RVSN	
Unknown	(Soviet Union)	RVSN	Suborbital	Test flight	Unknown	Successful
Unknown	Apogee: 620 kilometres (390 mi)					
Unknown	(Soviet Union) R-27 Zyb		(Soviet Union) Submarine, Okhotsk		(Soviet Union) RVSN	
Unknown	(Soviet Union)	RVSN	Suborbital	Test flight	Unknown	Successful
Unknown	Apogee: 620 kilometres (390 mi)					
Unknown	(Soviet Union) R-29R Volna		(Soviet Union) Submarine, Okhotsk		(Soviet Union) VMF	
Unknown	(Soviet Union)	VMF	Suborbital	Test flight	Unknown	Successful
Unknown	Apogee: 1,000 kilometres (620 mi)					
Unknown	(Soviet Union) R-29R Volna		(Soviet Union) Submarine, Okhotsk		(Soviet Union) VMF	
Unknown	(Soviet Union)	VMF	Suborbital	Test flight	Unknown	Successful
Unknown	Apogee: 1,000 kilometres (620 mi)					
Unknown	(Soviet Union) R-29R Volna		(Soviet Union) Submarine, Okhotsk		(Soviet Union) VMF	
Unknown	(Soviet Union)	VMF	Suborbital	Test flight	Unknown	Successful
Unknown	Apogee: 1,000 kilometres (620 mi)					
Unknown	(Soviet Union) R-29 Vysota		(Soviet Union) Submarine, Okhotsk		(Soviet Union) VMF	
Unknown	(Soviet Union)	VMF	Suborbital	Test flight	Unknown	Successful
Unknown	Apogee: 1,000 kilometres (620 mi)					
Unknown	(Soviet Union) R-29 Vysota		(Soviet Union) Submarine, Okhotsk		(Soviet Union) VMF	
Unknown	(Soviet Union)	VMF	Suborbital	Test flight	Unknown	Successful
Unknown	Apogee: 1,000 kilometres (620 mi)					
Unknown	(Soviet Union) R-29 Vysota		(Soviet Union) Submarine, Okhotsk		(Soviet Union) VMF	
Unknown	(Soviet Union)	VMF	Suborbital	Test flight	Unknown	Successful
Unknown	Apogee: 1,000 kilometres (620 mi)					
Unknown	(Soviet Union) R-29 Vysota		(Soviet Union) Submarine, Okhotsk		(Soviet Union) VMF	
Unknown	(Soviet Union)	VMF	Suborbital	Test flight	Unknown	Successful
Unknown	Apogee: 1,000 kilometres (620 mi)					
Unknown	(Soviet Union) R-36MUTTKh		(Soviet Union) Baikonur		(Soviet Union) RVSN	
Unknown	(Soviet Union)	RVSN	Suborbital	Test flight	Unknown	Successful
Unknown	Apogee: 1,000 kilometres (620 mi)					
Unknown	(Soviet Union) R-36MUTTKh		(Soviet Union) Baikonur		(Soviet Union) RVSN	
Unknown	(Soviet Union)	RVSN	Suborbital	Test flight	Unknown	Successful
Unknown	Apogee: 1,000 kilometres (620 mi)					
Unknown	(Soviet Union) R-36MUTTKh		(Soviet Union) Baikonur		(Soviet Union) RVSN	
Unknown	(Soviet Union)	RVSN	Suborbital	Test flight	Unknown	Successful
Unknown	Apogee: 1,000 kilometres (620 mi)					
Unknown	(Soviet Union) R-36MUTTKh		(Soviet Union) Baikonur		(Soviet Union) RVSN	
Unknown	(Soviet Union)	RVSN	Suborbital	Test flight	Unknown	Successful
Unknown	Apogee: 1,000 kilometres (620 mi)					
Unknown	(Soviet Union) UR-100N		(Soviet Union) Baikonur		(Soviet Union) RVSN	
Unknown	(Soviet Union)	RVSN	Suborbital	Test flight	Unknown	Successful
Unknown	Apogee: 1,000 kilometres (620 mi)					
Unknown	(Soviet Union) UR-100N		(Soviet Union) Baikonur		(Soviet Union) RVSN	
Unknown	(Soviet Union)	RVSN	Suborbital	Test flight	Unknown	Successful
Unknown	Apogee: 1,000 kilometres (620 mi)					
Unknown	(Soviet Union) UR-100N		(Soviet Union) Baikonur		(Soviet Union) RVSN	
Unknown	(Soviet Union)	RVSN	Suborbital	Test flight	Unknown	Successful
Unknown	Apogee: 1,000 kilometres (620 mi)					
Unknown	(Soviet Union) UR-100N		(Soviet Union) Baikonur		(Soviet Union) RVSN	
Unknown	(Soviet Union)	RVSN	Suborbital	Test flight	Unknown	Successful
Unknown	Apogee: 1,000 kilometres (620 mi)					
Unknown	(Soviet Union) UR-100N		(Soviet Union) Baikonur		(Soviet Union) RVSN	
Unknown	(Soviet Union)	RVSN	Suborbital	Test flight	Unknown	Successful
Unknown	Apogee: 1,000 kilometres (620 mi)					
Unknown	(Soviet Union) UR-100NUTTKh		(Soviet Union) Baikonur		(Soviet Union) RVSN	
Unknown	(Soviet Union)	RVSN	Suborbital	Test flight	Unknown	Successful
Unknown	Apogee: 1,000 kilometres (620 mi)					
Unknown	(Soviet Union) UR-100NUTTKh		(Soviet Union) Baikonur		(Soviet Union) RVSN	
Unknown	(Soviet Union)	RVSN	Suborbital	Test flight	Unknown	Successful
Unknown	Apogee: 1,000 kilometres (620 mi)					
Unknown	(Soviet Union) UR-100NUTTKh		(Soviet Union) Baikonur		(Soviet Union) RVSN	
Unknown	(Soviet Union)	RVSN	Suborbital	Test flight	Unknown	Successful
Unknown	Apogee: 1,000 kilometres (620 mi)					
Unknown	(Soviet Union) UR-100NUTTKh		(Soviet Union) Baikonur		(Soviet Union) RVSN	
Unknown	(Soviet Union)	RVSN	Suborbital	Test flight	Unknown	Successful
Unknown	Apogee: 1,000 kilometres (620 mi)					
Unknown	(Soviet Union) UR-100NUTTKh		(Soviet Union) Baikonur		(Soviet Union) RVSN	
Unknown	(Soviet Union)	RVSN	Suborbital	Test flight	Unknown	Successful
Unknown	Apogee: 1,000 kilometres (620 mi)					
Unknown	(Soviet Union) UR-100NUTTKh		(Soviet Union) Baikonur		(Soviet Union) RVSN	
Unknown	(Soviet Union)	RVSN	Suborbital	Test flight	Unknown	Successful
Unknown	Apogee: 1,000 kilometres (620 mi)					

- ← Jan
- Feb
- Mar
- Apr
- May
- Jun
- Jul
- Aug
- Sep
- Oct
- Nov
- Dec →

== Deep-space rendezvous ==
Date (UTC)	Spacecraft	Event	Remarks
26 August	Voyager 2	Flyby of Saturn	Gravity assist; Closest approach: 101,000 kilometres (63,000 mi)
