= Punta Lobos =

Headland and rocket launch site in Peru

- Peru

Site information
- Type: rocket launch site

Location
- Location in Peru
- Coordinates: 12°30′S 76°48′W

Site history
- Built: 1980
- In use: 1980 to 1990

Punta Lobos is a headland and was a launch site for sounding rockets in Peru at 12°30′S 76°48′W. Between 1980 and 1990, various rockets of the type super Loki, Nike Orion, Taurus Orion and Taurus Tomahawk were launched there.
