= Progress 12 =

Soviet unmanned Progress cargo spacecraft

- A Progress 7K-TG spacecraft
- Mission type: Salyut 6 resupply
- COSPAR ID: 1981-007A
- SATCAT no.: 12152

Spacecraft properties
- Spacecraft: Progress (No.113)
- Spacecraft type: Progress 7K-TG
- Manufacturer: NPO Energia

Start of mission
- Launch date: 24 January 1981, 14:18:02 UTC
- Rocket: Soyuz-U
- Launch site: Baikonur, Site 1/5

End of mission
- Disposal: Deorbited
- Decay date: 20 March 1981, 16:59 UTC

Orbital parameters
- Reference system: Geocentric
- Regime: Low Earth
- Perigee altitude: 247 km
- Apogee altitude: 308 km
- Inclination: 51.7°
- Period: 90.0 minutes
- Epoch: 24 January 1981

Docking with Salyut 6
- Docking port: Aft
- Docking date: 26 January 1981, 15:56 UTC
- Undocking date: 19 March 1981, 18:14 UTC

Progress 12 (Russian: Прогресс 12) was a Soviet unmanned Progress cargo spacecraft, which was launched in January 1981 to resupply the Salyut 6 space station.

== Spacecraft ==
Progress 12 was a Progress 7K-TG spacecraft. The twelfth of forty three to be launched, it had the serial number 113. The Progress 7K-TG spacecraft was the first generation Progress, derived from the Soyuz 7K-T and intended for uncrewed logistics missions to space stations in support of the Salyut programme. On some missions the spacecraft was also used to adjust the orbit of the space station.

The Progress spacecraft had a dry mass of 6,520 kilograms (14,370 lb), which increased to around 7,020 kilograms (15,480 lb) when fully fuelled. It measured 7.48 metres (24.5 ft) in length, and 2.72 metres (8 ft 11 in) in diameter. Each spacecraft could accommodate up to 2,500 kilograms (5,500 lb) of payload, consisting of dry cargo and propellant. The spacecraft was powered by chemical batteries, and could operate in free flight for up to three days, remaining docked to the station for up to thirty.

== Launch ==
Progress 12 launched on 24 January 1981 from the Baikonur Cosmodrome in the Kazakh SSR. It used a Soyuz-U rocket.

== Docking ==
Progress 12 docked with the aft port of Salyut 6 on 26 January 1981 at 15:56 UTC, and was undocked on 19 March 1981 at 18:14 UTC.

== Decay ==
It remained in orbit until 20 March 1981, when it was deorbited. The deorbit burn occurred at 16:59 UTC.

== See also ==
- 1981 in spaceflight
- List of Progress missions
- List of uncrewed spaceflights to Salyut space stations
