= Kosmos 1261 =

Soviet military early warning satellite

- Mission type: Early warning
- COSPAR ID: 1981-031A
- SATCAT no.: 12376
- Mission duration: 4 years

Spacecraft properties
- Spacecraft type: US-K
- Launch mass: 1,900 kilograms (4,200 lb)

Start of mission
- Launch date: 31 March 1981, 09:40 UTC
- Rocket: Molniya-M/2BL
- Launch site: Plesetsk Cosmodrome

End of mission
- Deactivated: 1 May 1981

Orbital parameters
- Reference system: Geocentric
- Regime: Molniya
- Perigee altitude: 637 kilometres (396 mi)
- Apogee altitude: 39,747 kilometres (24,698 mi)
- Inclination: 63.0 degrees
- Period: 718.39 minutes

Kosmos 1261 (Russian: Космос 1261 meaning Cosmos 1261) was a Soviet US-K missile early warning satellite which was launched in 1981 as part of the Soviet military's Oko programme. The satellite was designed to identify missile launches using optical telescopes and infrared sensors.

Kosmos 1261 was launched from Site 41/1 at Plesetsk Cosmodrome in the Russian SSR. A Molniya-M carrier rocket with a 2BL upper stage was used to perform the launch, which took place at 09:40 UTC on 31 March 1981. The launch successfully placed the satellite into a molniya orbit. It subsequently received its Kosmos designation, and the international designator 1981-031A. The United States Space Command assigned it the Satellite Catalog Number 12376.

Kosmos 1261 was a US-K satellite like Kosmos 862 that self-destructed in orbit, NASA believe deliberately. The spacecraft attempted to maneuver from its transfer orbit to an operational orbit 3 days after launch, but it appears that the maneuver was unsuccessful, and the spacecraft never became ground track-stabilized. Immediately after the maneuver some debris was detected, while additional debris were discovered in mid-May. There may have been more than one debris event. All of the resultant debris is still in orbit.

== See also ==
- 1981 in spaceflight
- List of Kosmos satellites (1251–1500)
- List of Oko satellites
- List of R-7 launches (1980-1984)
