= Intelsat V F-3 =

Geostationary communications satellite

Intelsat V F-3 → Intelsat 503
- Mission type: Communication
- Operator: COMSAT / INTELSAT
- COSPAR ID: 1981-119A
- SATCAT no.: 12994
- Mission duration: 7 years (planned)

Spacecraft properties
- Bus: Intelsat V
- Manufacturer: Ford Aerospace
- Launch mass: 1928 kg
- Dry mass: 1012 kg
- Dimensions: 1.66 x 2.1 x 1.77 metres
- Power: 1800 watts

Start of mission
- Launch date: 15 December 1981, 23:35:00 UTC
- Rocket: Atlas SLV-3D Centaur-D1AR (AC-55)
- Launch site: CCAFS, LC-36B
- Contractor: General Dynamics

End of mission
- Disposal: Graveyard orbit
- Deactivated: January 1998

Orbital parameters
- Reference system: Geocentric orbit
- Regime: Geostationary orbit
- Longitude: 174.0° East (1981-1992); 177.0° West (1992-1995); 157.0° East (1995-1998)
- Epoch: 15 December 1981

Transponders
- Band: 21 C-band; 4 Ku-band

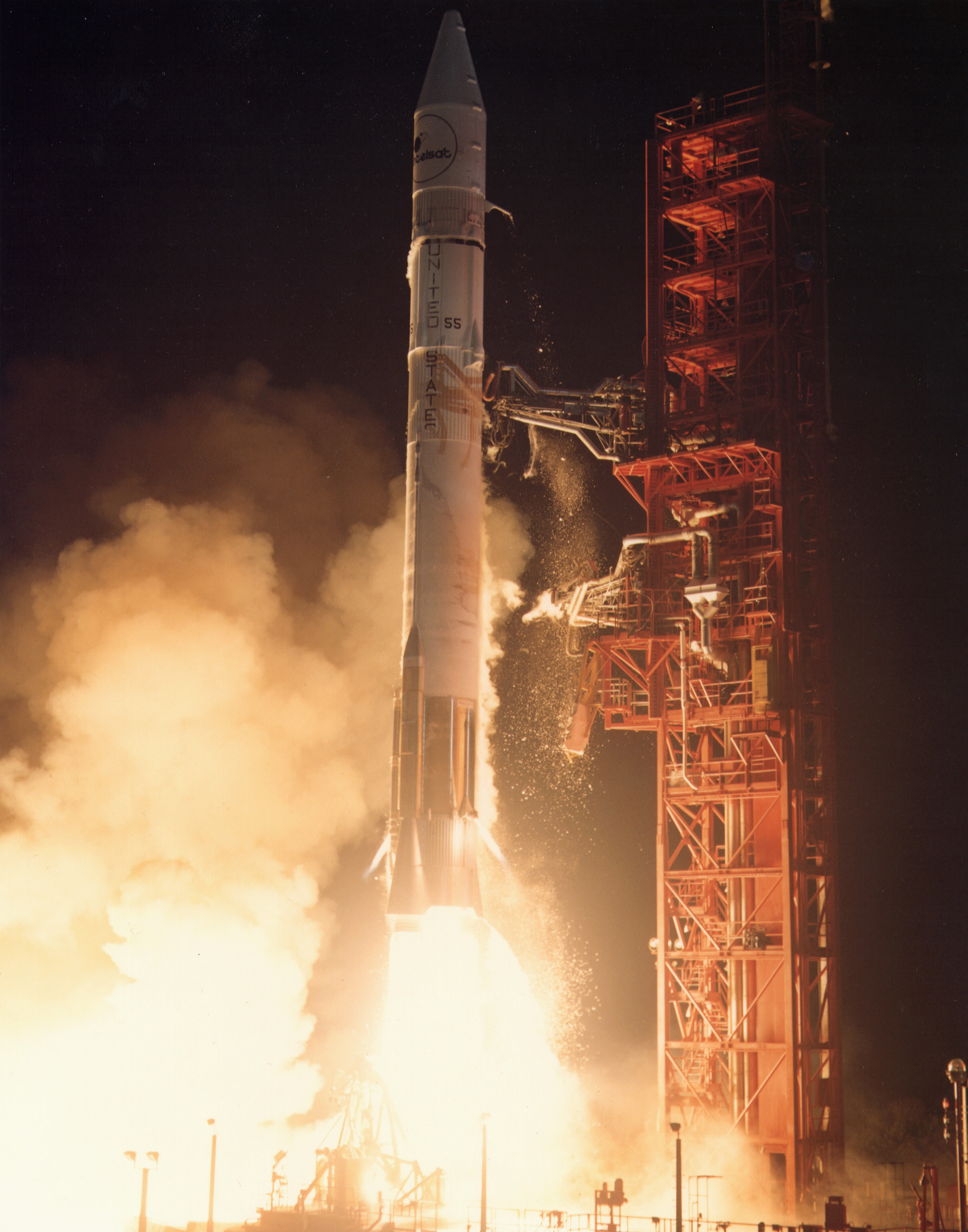
Launch of Intelsat V F-3

Intelsat V F-3, then named Intelsat 503, was a communications satellite operated by COMSAT. Launched on 15 December 1981, it was the third of fifteen Intelsat V satellites to be launched. The Intelsat V series was constructed by Ford Aerospace, based on the Intelsat V satellite bus. Intelsat V F-3 was part of an advanced series of satellites designed to provide greater telecommunications capacity for Intelsat's global network.

== Satellite ==
The satellite was box-shaped, measuring 1.66 by 2.1 by 1.77 metres; solar arrays spanned 15.9 metres tip to tip. The arrays, supplemented by nickel-hydrogen batteries during eclipse, provided 1800 watts of power. The payload housed 21 C-band and 4 Ku-band transponders. It could accommodate 15,000 two-way voice circuits and two TV channels simultaneously. It had a launch mass of 1928 kg. The satellite was deactivated in January 1998.

== Launch ==
The satellite was successfully launched into space on 15 December 1981 at 23:35:00 UTC, by means of an Atlas SLV-3D Centaur-D1AR vehicle from the Cape Canaveral Air Force Station, Florida, United States.

== See also ==
- 1981 in spaceflight
