= Kosmos 1278 =

Soviet military early warning satellite

- Mission type: Early warning
- COSPAR ID: 1981-058A
- SATCAT no.: 12547
- Mission duration: 4 years

Spacecraft properties
- Spacecraft type: US-K
- Launch mass: 1,900 kilograms (4,200 lb)

Start of mission
- Launch date: 19 June 1981, 19:37 UTC
- Rocket: Molniya-M/2BL
- Launch site: Plesetsk Cosmodrome

End of mission
- Deactivated: 5 July 1984
- Decay date: 2 September 2000

Orbital parameters
- Reference system: Geocentric
- Regime: Molniya
- Perigee altitude: 665 kilometres (413 mi)
- Apogee altitude: 39,725 kilometres (24,684 mi)
- Inclination: 62.8 degrees
- Period: 718.49 minutes

Kosmos 1278 (Russian: Космос 1278 meaning Cosmos 1278) was a Soviet US-K missile early warning satellite which was launched in 1981 as part of the Soviet military's Oko programme. The satellite was designed to identify missile launches using optical telescopes and infrared sensors.

Kosmos 1278 was launched from Site 43/3 at Plesetsk Cosmodrome in the Russian SSR. A Molniya-M carrier rocket with a 2BL upper stage was used to perform the launch, which took place at 19:37 UTC on 19 June 1981. The launch successfully placed the satellite into a molniya orbit. It subsequently received its Kosmos designation, and the international designator 1981-058A. The United States Space Command assigned it the Satellite Catalog Number 12547.

Kosmos 1278 was a US-K satellite like Kosmos 862 that self-destructed in orbit, NASA believes deliberately. It had been inactive since early 1984 and broke apart in early-December 1984. The main component may have re-entered the Earth's atmosphere on 2 September 2000. Debris from this satellite can not be tracked.

== See also ==
- 1981 in spaceflight
- List of Kosmos satellites (1251–1500)
- List of Oko satellites
- List of R-7 launches (1980-1984)
