= Kosmos 1285 =

Soviet military early warning satellite

- Mission type: Early warning
- COSPAR ID: 1981-071A
- SATCAT no.: 12627
- Mission duration: 4 years

Spacecraft properties
- Spacecraft type: US-K
- Launch mass: 1,900 kilograms (4,200 lb)

Start of mission
- Launch date: 4 August 1981, 00:13 UTC
- Rocket: Molniya-M/2BL
- Launch site: Plesetsk Cosmodrome

End of mission
- Deactivated: 21 November 1981

Orbital parameters
- Reference system: Geocentric
- Regime: Molniya
- Perigee altitude: 622 kilometres (386 mi)
- Apogee altitude: 40,204 kilometres (24,982 mi)
- Inclination: 63.0 degrees
- Period: 727.37 minutes

Kosmos 1285 (Russian: Космос 1285 meaning Cosmos 1285) was a Soviet US-K missile early warning satellite which was launched in 1981 as part of the Soviet military's Oko programme. The satellite was designed to identify missile launches using optical telescopes and infrared sensors.

Kosmos 1285 was launched from Site 16/2 at Plesetsk Cosmodrome in the Russian SSR. A Molniya-M carrier rocket with a 2BL upper stage was used to perform the launch, which took place at 00:13 UTC on 4 August 1981. The launch successfully placed the satellite into a molniya orbit. It subsequently received its Kosmos designation, and the international designator 1981-071A. The United States Space Command assigned it the Satellite Catalog Number 12627.

Kosmos 1285 was a US-K satellite like Kosmos 862 that self-destructed in orbit, NASA believes deliberately. 1285 was placed in a temporary transfer orbit on the day of launch by its launch vehicle but never maneuvered to an operational orbit. This suggests an early fatal spacecraft malfunction. All of its trackable debris is still in orbit.

== See also ==
- 1981 in spaceflight
- List of Kosmos satellites (1251–1500)
- List of Oko satellites
- List of R-7 launches (1980-1984)
