= Kosmos 1275 =

Soviet military navigation satellite

- Mission type: Navigation
- COSPAR ID: 1981-053A
- SATCAT no.: 12504
- Mission duration: 2 months

Spacecraft properties
- Launch mass: 810 kilograms (1,790 lb)

Start of mission
- Launch date: 4 June 1981, 19:37 UTC
- Rocket: Kosmos-3M
- Launch site: Plesetsk Cosmodrome

End of mission
- Deactivated: 24 July 1981

Orbital parameters
- Reference system: Geocentric
- Inclination: 83 degrees

Kosmos 1275 (Russian: Космос 1275 meaning Cosmos 1275) was a part of a 6-satellite Soviet military navigation system, called the Parus series, distributed in orbital planes spaced 30 degrees apart, and launched from the Plesetsk cosmodrome aboard a Cosmos rocket. It is believed to be the first satellite destroyed by untracked Satellite debris. On 4th July 2025, Metop-B had to perform a collision avoidance manoeuvre to avoid Kosmos 1275 debris demonstrating the long term problem of spacecraft debris above an altitude of 600 km.

Kosmos 1275 was launched from the Plesetsk Cosmodrome in the Russian SSR on 4 June 1981. On July 24, 1981, at 23.51 GMT, it suddenly ceased operations and broke into more 300 large pieces of debris and many other too small to track. Because it had no propellant on board, it was believed that there was nothing internal that could have led to its break-up. However, it is possible that a battery explosion caused the breakup.

== See also ==
- 1981 in spaceflight
- List of Kosmos satellites (1251–1500)
