= USS Lewis and Clark (SSBN-644) =

Submarine of the United States

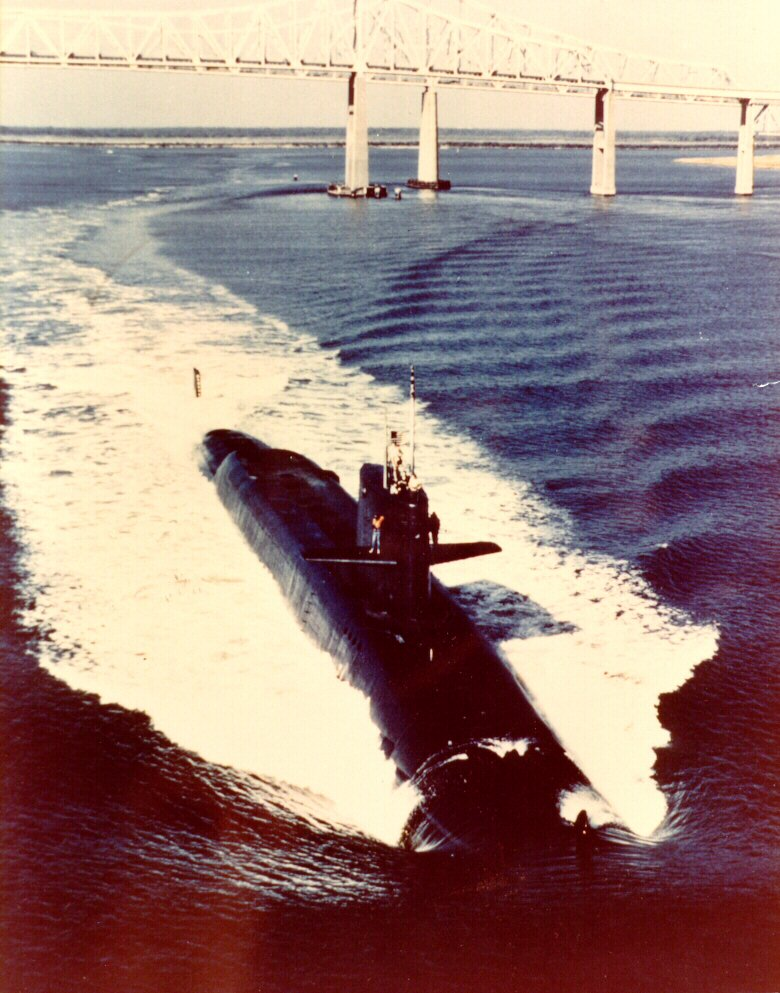
- USS Lewis and Clark (SSBN-644)

History

United States
- Name: USS Lewis and Clark
- Namesake: Meriwether Lewis (1774–1809) and William Clark (1770–1838), who carried out the Lewis and Clark Expedition (1804–06)
- Awarded: 1 November 1962
- Builder: Newport News Shipbuilding and Drydock Company
- Laid down: 29 July 1963
- Launched: 21 November 1964
- Sponsored by: Mrs. M. F. Engman and Mrs. M. G. Sale
- Commissioned: 22 December 1965
- Decommissioned: 27 June 1992
- Stricken: 1 August 1992
- Fate: Scrapping via Ship and Submarine Recycling Program began 1 October 1995; completed 23 September 1996; Sail and top of rudder preserved.

General characteristics
- Class & type: Benjamin Franklin class fleet ballistic missile submarine
- Displacement: 7,320 tons surfaced; 8,250 tons submerged
- Length: 425 ft (130 m)
- Beam: 33 ft (10 m)
- Draft: 33 ft (10 m)
- Installed power: 15,000 shp (11,185 kW)
- Propulsion: One S5W pressurized-water nuclear reactor, two geared steam turbines, one shaft
- Speed: Over 20 knots
- Test depth: 1,300 feet (400 m)
- Complement: Two crews (Blue Crew and Gold Crew) of 14 officers and 126 enlisted men each
- Armament: 16 ballistic missile tubes with one Polaris, later Poseidon ballistic missile each; 4 × 21 inches (530 mm) torpedo tubes

USS Lewis and Clark (SSBN-644), a Benjamin Franklin class ballistic missile submarine, was the first ship of the United States Navy to be named for the explorers Meriwether Lewis (1774–1809) and William Clark (1770–1838), who carried out the Lewis and Clark Expedition of 1804–06.

== Construction and commissioning ==
The contract to construct Lewis and Clark was awarded on 1 November 1962, and her keel was laid down by Newport News Shipbuilding and Dry Dock Company at Newport News, Virginia, on 29 July 1963. She was launched on 21 November 1964, sponsored by Mrs. M. F. Engman and Mrs. M. G. Sale, and commissioned on 22 December 1965 with Commander John F. Fagan, Jr., in command of the Blue Crew and Commander Kenneth A. Porter in command of the Gold Crew.

== Service history ==
After shakedown and missile firing off Cape Kennedy, Florida, in 1966, Lewis and Clark began deterrent patrols, armed with Polaris A3 ballistic missiles.

History needed for 1969–72.

On 21 July 1972, Lewis and Clark completed conversion of her ballistic missile tubes to carry Poseidon C3 ballistic missiles. On 18 December 1972, the Gold Crew successfully launched one Poseidon C-3 missile in support of Lewis and Clark's Demonstration and Shakedown Operation (DASO).

History for 1972–73 needed.

On 8 April 1973, Lewis and Clark deployed for an operational deterrent patrol.

History needed for 1973–81.

On 19 June 1981, Lewis and Clark successfully fired four Poseidon C-3 missiles in a Follow-on Operational Test. On 23 July 1981, she began a Poseidon refueling overhaul at Newport News Shipbuilding.

History needed for 1981–85.

On 13 June 1985, Lewis and Clark successfully launched four Poseidon C-3 missiles in a Follow-on Operational Test.

History needed for 1985–91.

== Deactivation, decommissioning, and disposal ==
Deactivated while still in commission on 1 October 1991, Lewis and Clark was decommissioned on 27 June 1992 and stricken from the Naval Vessel Register on 1 August 1992. Her scrapping via the U.S. Navy's Nuclear-Powered Ship and Submarine Recycling Program at Bremerton, Washington began on 1 October 1995 and was completed on 23 September 1996.

== Commemoration ==
Lewis and Clark's sail and fairwater planes and the top of her rudder are on display at the Patriots Point Naval and Maritime Museum in Mt Pleasant, South Carolina, part of a memorial to the officers and men of the U.S. Navy Submarine Service who served during the Cold War.

The periscope is on display at the Door County Maritime Museum in Sturgeon Bay, Wisconsin.
