= Vandenberg Launch Facility 9 =

Coordinates: 34.8786°N 120.6336°W

Launch Facility 09
- Interactive map of Launch Facility 09
- Short name: LF-09
- Operator: US Air Force
- Launch pad: 1
Launch history
- Status: Active
- Launches: 109
- First launch: 29 June 1964; Minuteman-IB
- Last launch: 19 February 2025; Minuteman-III
- Associated rockets: Minuteman

Vandenberg Space Force Base Launch Facility 09 (LF-09) is a US Air Force Intercontinental ballistic missile launch facility on Vandenberg SFB, California, USA. It is a launch site for the land-based Minuteman missile series.

The site was a test and training made operational on January 15, 1964 and in use until at least 1996. It operated with Minuteman I and Minuteman III missiles.
