= USS Simon Bolivar =

Submarine of the United States

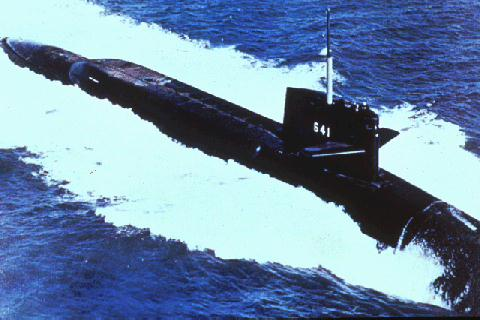
- USS Simon Bolivar (SSBN-641) on 1 February 1991

History

United States
- Namesake: Simón Bolívar (1783–1830), a hero of South American independence movements
- Awarded: 1 November 1962
- Builder: Newport News Shipbuilding, Newport News, Virginia
- Laid down: 17 April 1963
- Launched: 22 August 1964
- Sponsored by: Mrs. Thomas C. Mann
- Commissioned: 29 October 1965
- Decommissioned: 8 February 1995
- Stricken: 8 February 1995
- Honors and awards: Battle Effectiveness Award (Battle "E") Fiscal Year 1974; Providence Plantation Award Fiscal Year 1974; Battle "E" Fiscal Year 1975; Battle "E" Fiscal Year 1976; Battle "E" Fiscal Year 1982
- Fate: Scrapping via Ship-Submarine Recycling Program begun 1 October 1994; completed 1 December 1995

General characteristics
- Class & type: Benjamin Franklin class nuclear-powered ballistic missile submarine
- Displacement: 6,494 tons
- Length: 425 feet (130 m)
- Beam: 33 feet (10 m)
- Draft: 32 feet (9.8 m)
- Propulsion: S5W reactor
- Speed: 16 knots (30 km/h) surfaced; 21 knots (39 km/h) submerged
- Test depth: 1,300 feet (400 m)
- Complement: Two crews (Blue Crew and Gold Crew) of 14 officers and 126 enlisted men each
- Armament: 16 × missile tubes, 4 × 21 inches (530 mm) torpedo tubes

USS Simon Bolivar (SSBN-641), a Benjamin Franklin class fleet ballistic missile submarine, was the only ship of the United States Navy to be named after Simón Bolívar (1783–1830), the Venezuelan soldier of the independence movements of the former Spanish colonies in South America.

== Construction and commissioning ==
Simon Bolivar's keel was laid down on 17 April 1963 by Newport News Shipbuilding of Newport News, Virginia. She was launched on 22 August 1964, sponsored by Nancy Milling (Aynesworth) Mann, wife of Assistant Secretary of State for Inter-American Affairs Thomas C. Mann, and commissioned on 29 October 1965 with Commander Charles H. Griffiths commanding the Blue Crew and Commander Charles A. Orem commanding the Gold Crew.

== Service history ==
During late December 1965 and most of January 1966, Simon Bolivar underwent demonstration and shakedown operations. The Gold Crew successfully fired a Polaris A-3 ballistic missile off the coast of Cape Kennedy, Florida, on 17 January 1966, and the Blue Crew completed a successful Polaris missile firing on 31 January. In February 1966, the Gold Crew continued shakedown operations in the Caribbean Sea. In March 1966, Simon Bolivar's home port was changed to Charleston, South Carolina, where she was assigned to Submarine Squadron 18, and minor deficiencies were corrected during a shipyard availability period. Beginning in April 1966, the Blue Crew prepared for and conducted the first deterrent patrol, while the Gold Crew entered a training period. The Gold Crew conducted the second deterrent patrol, then went into a training period that lasted into early 1967 while the Blue Crew conducted the third deterrent patrol. Simon Bolivar completed her third deterrent patrol in January 1967.

Simon Bolivar's routine of deterrent patrols out of Charleston by her two crews continued until 7 February 1971, when she returned to Newport News for overhaul and conversion of her ballistic missile system to support Poseidon missiles.

Simon Bolivar departed Newport News on 12 May 1972 for post-overhaul shakedown operations and refresher training for her two crews, which lasted until 16 September 1972. By the end of 1972, she had resumed deterrent patrols.

In October 1974 Simon Bolivar returned to Charleston and Submarine Squadron 18. She was awarded the Battle Effectiveness Award (Battle "E") for Fiscal Year 1974 and the Providence Plantation Award for most outstanding fleet ballistic missile submarine in the United States Atlantic Fleet. She also was awarded the Battle "E" for in Fiscal Years 1975 and 1976.

In February 1979, following her 40th deterrent patrol, Simon Bolivar entered Portsmouth Naval Shipyard at Kittery, Maine, for overhaul and conversion of her ballistic missile system to support Trident C-4 ballistic missiles. Upon completion of overhaul she returned to her home port of Charleston in January 1981.

Simon Bolivar continued to make deterrent patrols, undergoing occasional refits at Naval Submarine Base Kings Bay Georgia, and was awarded the Battle "E" for Fiscal Year 1982. She successfully launched a Trident test missile in the summer of 1983. She entered Portsmouth Naval Shipyard again in 1985 for another refit including an asbestos rip out and resumed patrols in 1987.

== Deactivation, decommissioning, and disposal ==
Deactivated while still in commission in September 1994, Simon Bolivar was both decommissioned and stricken from the Naval Vessel Register on 8 February 1995. Her scrapping via the U.S. Navy's Nuclear-Powered Ship-Submarine Recycling Program at Bremerton, Washington began on 1 October 1994 and was completed on 1 December 1995.
