= Taurus Tomahawk =

Two-stage sounding rocket

Taurus Tomahawk is a two-stage sounding rocket, consisting of a Taurus first stage derived from MGR-1 Honest John rocket and a TE-416 Tomahawk upper stage.

Taurus Tomahawks were used between 1978 and 1987. The rocket had a launch thrust of 82,000 lbf (360 kN), a launch weight of 1,657 kg (3,653 lb), a diameter of 58 cm (22.8 in) and an overall length of 9.72 m (31.9 ft). It could carry 27 kg (60 lb) of payload to an altitude of 590 km (370 mi).
