= 1985 in spaceflight =

National firsts
- Space traveller: Mexico; Saudi Arabia

Rockets
- Maiden flights: Space Shuttle Atlantis; M-3SII

Crewed flights
- Orbital: 11
- Total travellers: 63

1985 in spaceflight

The following is an outline of 1985 in spaceflight.

== Overview ==
=== First Atlantis flight ===
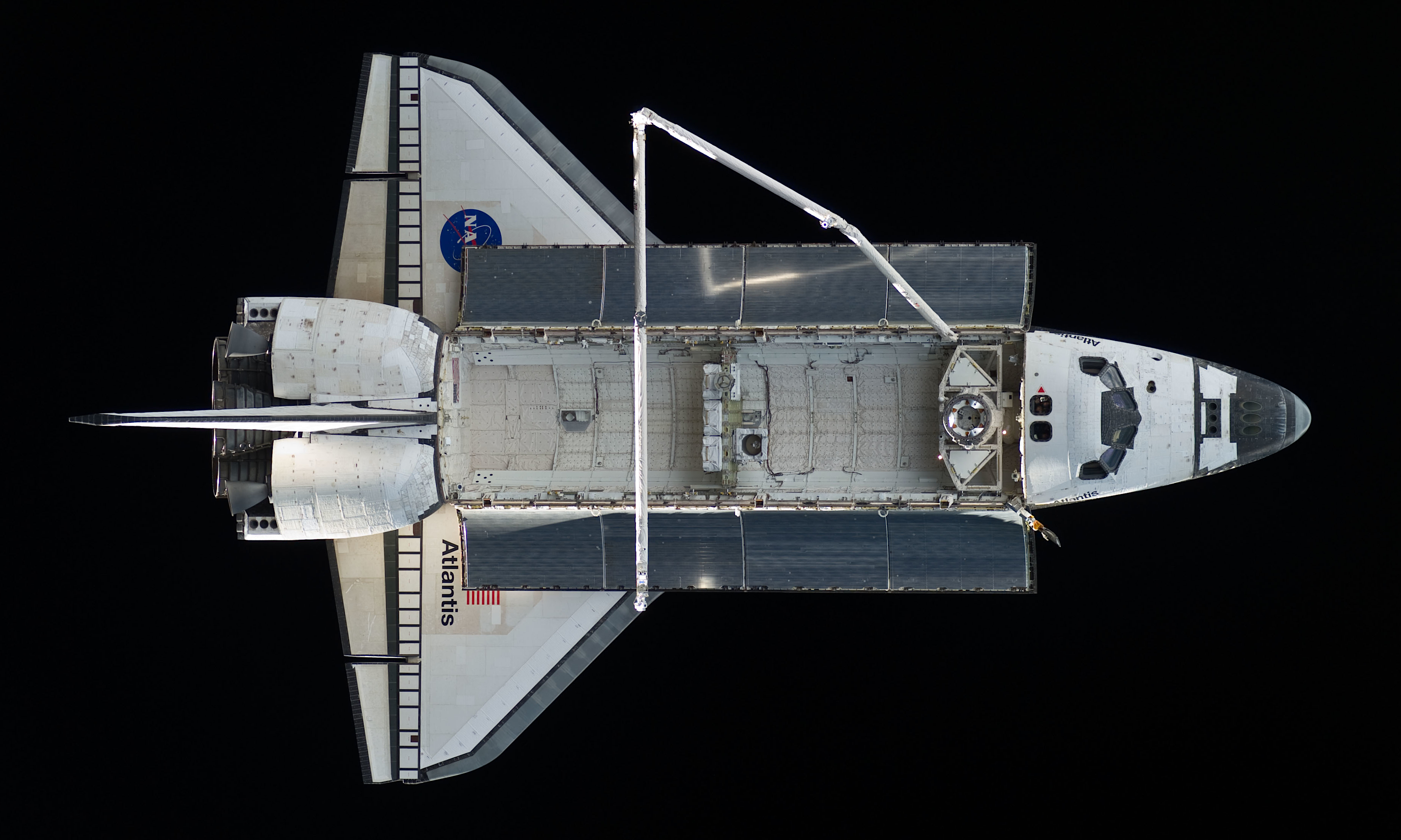
Atlantis in orbit in 2010, during STS-132

Space Shuttle Atlantis (Orbiter Vehicle designation: OV‑104) is a retired Space Shuttle orbiter vehicle which belongs to NASA, the spaceflight and space exploration agency of the United States. Atlantis was manufactured by the Rockwell International company in Southern California and was delivered to the Kennedy Space Center in Eastern Florida in April 1985. Atlantis is the fourth operational and the second-to-last Space Shuttle built. Its maiden flight was STS-51-J made from October 3 to 7, 1985.

== Orbital launches ==
- ← Jan
- Feb
- Mar
- Apr
- May
- Jun
- Jul
- Aug
- Sep
- Oct
- Nov
- Dec →

Date and time (UTC)	Rocket	Flight number	Launch site		LSP	
Date and time (UTC)	Payload (⚀ = CubeSat)	Operator	Orbit	Function	Decay (UTC)	Outcome
Date and time (UTC)	Remarks					
=== January ===
7 January; 19:26	(Japan) M-3SII / KM-P	M-3SII-1	(Japan) Kagoshima LP-M		(Japan) ISAS	
7 January; 19:26	(Japan) Sakigake (MS-T5)	ISAS	Heliocentric	1P/Halley comet flyby	8 January 1999	Successful
7 January; 19:26	Maiden flight of M-3SII. First Japanese deep space probe.					
9 January; 10:45	(Soviet Union) Soyuz U		(Soviet Union) Baikonur Site 31/6		(Soviet Union)	
9 January; 10:45	(Soviet Union) Kosmos 1616 (Yantar-4K2 №12/Kobalt №12)	GRU	Low Earth	Reconnaissance	In orbit	Operational
15 January; 14:50	(Soviet Union) Tsyklon-3		(Soviet Union) Plesetsk Site 32/1		(Soviet Union)	
15 January; 14:50	(Soviet Union) Kosmos 1617 (Strela-3 №1)	VKS	Low Earth	Military communications	In orbit	Operational
15 January; 14:50	(Soviet Union) Kosmos 1618 (Strela-3 №2)	VKS	Low Earth	Military communications	In orbit	Operational
15 January; 14:50	(Soviet Union) Kosmos 1619 (Strela-3 №3)	VKS	Low Earth	Military communications	In orbit	Operational
15 January; 14:50	(Soviet Union) Kosmos 1620 (Strela-3 №4)	VKS	Low Earth	Military communications	In orbit	Operational
15 January; 14:50	(Soviet Union) Kosmos 1621 (Strela-3 №5)	VKS	Low Earth	Military communications	In orbit	Operational
15 January; 14:50	(Soviet Union) Kosmos 1622 (Strela-3 №6)	VKS	Low Earth	Military communications	In orbit	Operational
16 January	(Soviet Union) Molniya-M / Blok-ML		(Soviet Union) Plesetsk Site 43/4		(Soviet Union)	
16 January	(Soviet Union) Molniya-3 36L	NPO PM	Molniya	Communications	In orbit	Operational
16 January	(Soviet Union) Soyuz U		(Soviet Union) Baikonur Site 1/5		(Soviet Union)	
16 January	(Soviet Union) Kosmos 1623 (Zenit-8 №10/Oblik №10)	GRU	Low Earth	Reconnaissance	In orbit	Operational
17 January	(Soviet Union) Kosmos-3M		(Soviet Union) Plesetsk Site 132/1		(Soviet Union)	
17 January	(Soviet Union) Kosmos 1624 (Strela-2M №36)		Low Earth	Military communications	In orbit	Operational
18 January	(Soviet Union) Proton-K / Blok-DM		(Soviet Union) Baikonur Site 200/39		(Soviet Union)	
18 January	(Soviet Union) Gorizont 11 (Gorizont 21L)		Geosynchronous	Communications	In orbit	Operational
23 January	(Soviet Union) Tsyklon-2		(Soviet Union) Baikonur LC-90		(Soviet Union)	
23 January	(Soviet Union) Kosmos 1625 (US-P №20)		Low Earth		In orbit	Operational
24 January	(Soviet Union) Tsyklon-3		(Soviet Union) Plesetsk Site 32/2		(Soviet Union)	
24 January	(Soviet Union) Kosmos 1626 (Tselina-D №47)		Low Earth	SIGINT	In orbit	Operational
24 January; 19:50	(United States) Space Shuttle Discovery / IUS		(United States) Kennedy LC-39A		(United States) United Space Alliance	
24 January; 19:50	(United States) STS-51-C	NASA	Low Earth	Satellite deployment	27 January; 21:23	Successful
24 January; 19:50	(United States) Orion 1 (USA-8/Magnum 1)	NRO	Geosynchronous	ELINT	In orbit	Successful
24 January; 19:50	Crewed orbital flight with five astronauts					
← Jan; Feb; Mar; Apr; May; Jun; Jul; Aug; Sep; Oct; Nov; Dec →; === February ===
1 February; 19:36	(Soviet Union) Kosmos-3M		(Soviet Union) Plesetsk Site 132/2		(Soviet Union)	
1 February; 19:36	(Soviet Union) Kosmos 1627 (Parus №48)		Low Earth	Navigation	In orbit	Operational
6 February	(Soviet Union) Soyuz U		(Soviet Union) Plesetsk Site 41/1		(Soviet Union)	
6 February	(Soviet Union) Kosmos 1628 (Zenit-8 №11/Oblik №11)	GRU	Low Earth	Reconnaissance	In orbit	Operational
6 February	(Soviet Union) Tsyklon-3		(Soviet Union) Plesetsk Site 32/1		(Soviet Union)	
6 February	(Soviet Union) Meteor-2 12		Low Earth	Meteorology	In orbit	Operational
8 February; 06:10	(United States) Titan 34B / Agena-D		(United States) Vandenberg SLC-4W		(United States)	
8 February; 06:10	(United States) Quasar 6 (SDS 6/USA-9)	NRO	Molniya	Communications	In orbit	Successful
8 February; 23:22	(France) Ariane 3		(France) Kourou ELA-1		(France) Arianespace	
8 February; 23:22	(Saudi Arabia) Arabsat-1A	Arabsat	Geosynchronous	Communications	March 1992	Successful
8 February; 23:22	(Brazil) Brasilsat-A1	Embratel	Geosynchronous	Communications	In orbit	Successful
8 February; 23:22	Arabsat 1A failed in March 1992					
21 February	(Soviet Union) Proton-K Blok-DM		(Soviet Union) Baikonur Site 200/39		(Soviet Union)	
21 February	(Soviet Union) Kosmos 1629 (US-KS №3)		Geosynchronous	Early warning	In orbit	Operational
27 February	(Soviet Union) Soyuz U		(Soviet Union) Baikonur Site 31/6		(Soviet Union)	
27 February	(Soviet Union) Kosmos 1630 (Yantar-4K2 №13/Kobalt №13)	GRU	Low Earth	Reconnaissance	In orbit	Operational
27 February	(Soviet Union) Kosmos-3M		(Soviet Union) Plesetsk Site 132/1		(Soviet Union)	
27 February	(Soviet Union) Kosmos 1631 (Taifun-1 №18/Vektor №18)		Low Earth	Radar Calibration	In orbit	Operational
← Jan; Feb; Mar; Apr; May; Jun; Jul; Aug; Sep; Oct; Nov; Dec →; === March ===
1 March	(Soviet Union) Soyuz U		(Soviet Union) Plesetsk Site 41/1		(Soviet Union)	
1 March	(Soviet Union) Kosmos 1632 (Zenit-8 №12/Oblik №12)	GRU	Low Earth	Reconnaissance	In orbit	Operational
5 March	(Soviet Union) Tsyklon-3		(Soviet Union) Plesetsk Site 32/2		(Soviet Union)	
5 March	(Soviet Union) Kosmos 1633 (Tselina-D №48)		Low Earth	SIGINT	In orbit	Operational
13 March; 02:00	(United States) Atlas E / OIS		(United States) Vandenberg SLC-3W		(United States)	
13 March; 02:00	(United States) Geosat	US Navy	Sun-synchronous	Earth observation	In orbit	Successful
13 March; 02:00	Mission ended in January 1990					
14 March	(Soviet Union) Kosmos-3M		(Soviet Union) Plesetsk Site 132/2		(Soviet Union)	
14 March	(Soviet Union) Kosmos 1634 (Parus №49)		Low Earth	Navigation	In orbit	Operational
21 March	(Soviet Union) Kosmos-3M		(Soviet Union) Plesetsk Site 132/2		(Soviet Union)	
21 March	(Soviet Union) Kosmos 1635 (Strela-1M №289)		Low Earth	Military communications	In orbit	Operational
21 March	(Soviet Union) Kosmos 1636 (Strela-1M №290)		Low Earth	Military communications	In orbit	Operational
21 March	(Soviet Union) Kosmos 1637 (Strela-1M №291)		Low Earth	Military communications	In orbit	Operational
21 March	(Soviet Union) Kosmos 1638 (Strela-1M №292)		Low Earth	Military communications	In orbit	Operational
21 March	(Soviet Union) Kosmos 1639 (Strela-1M №293)		Low Earth	Military communications	In orbit	Operational
21 March	(Soviet Union) Kosmos 1640 (Strela-1M №294)		Low Earth	Military communications	In orbit	Operational
21 March	(Soviet Union) Kosmos 1641 (Strela-1M №295)		Low Earth	Military communications	In orbit	Operational
21 March	(Soviet Union) Kosmos 1642 (Strela-1M №296)		Low Earth	Military communications	In orbit	Operational
22 March	(Soviet Union) Proton-K Blok-DM		(Soviet Union) Baikonur Site 200/40		(Soviet Union)	
22 March	(Soviet Union) Ekran 14 (Ekran 28L)	NPO PM	Geosynchronous	Communications	In orbit	Operational
22 March; 23:55:00	(United States) Atlas G / Centaur-D1AR	AC-63	(United States) Cape Canaveral LC-36B		(United States)	
22 March; 23:55:00	(United Nations) Intelsat VA F-10 (Intelsat 510)	Intelsat	Geosynchronous	Communications	July 1999	Successful
25 March	(Soviet Union) Soyuz U		(Soviet Union) Baikonur Site 1/5		(Soviet Union)	
25 March	(Soviet Union) Kosmos 1643 (Yantar-4KS1 №3/Terilen №3)	GRU	Low Earth	Reconnaissance	In orbit	Operational
← Jan; Feb; Mar; Apr; May; Jun; Jul; Aug; Sep; Oct; Nov; Dec →; === April ===
3 April	(Soviet Union) Soyuz U		(Soviet Union) Baikonur Site 31/6		(Soviet Union)	
3 April	(Soviet Union) Kosmos 1644 (Zenit-8 №13/Oblik №13)	GRU	Low Earth	Reconnaissance	In orbit	Operational
12 April; 13:59	(United States) Space Shuttle Discovery / PAM-D		(United States) Kennedy LC-39A		(United States) United Space Alliance	
12 April; 13:59	(United States) STS-51-D	NASA	Low Earth	Satellite deployment	19 April; 13:54	Successful
12 April; 13:59	(Canada) Anik C1	Telesat Canada	Current: Graveyard; Operational: Geosynchronous	Communications	In orbit	Successful
12 April; 13:59	(United States) Leasat 3 (Syncom-4 3)	US Navy	Current: Graveyard; Operational: Geosynchronous	Communications	In orbit	Successful
12 April; 13:59	Crewed orbital flight with seven astronauts including the first sitting member of the United States Congress to fly in space (Senator Jake Garn). Anik C1 was retired on 5 May 2003. Leasat 3 failed to maneuver to geosynchronous orbit and was re-captured by mission STS-51-I in August, repaired and subsequently maneuvered to geosynchronous orbit. Discovery suffered extensive brake and tyre damage upon landing at Kennedy Space Center.					
13 April	(Soviet Union) Zenit-2		(Soviet Union) Baikonur Site 45		(Soviet Union)	
13 April	(Soviet Union) Kosmos (EPN 03.0694 №1)		Low Earth	Vehicle Evaluation	In orbit	Failure
16 April	(Soviet Union) Soyuz U		(Soviet Union) Plesetsk Site 41/1		(Soviet Union)	
16 April	(Soviet Union) Kosmos 1645 (Foton №1)		Low Earth	Microgravity	In orbit	Operational
18 April	(Soviet Union) Tsyklon-2		(Soviet Union) Baikonur Site 90		(Soviet Union)	
18 April	(Soviet Union) Kosmos 1646 (US-P №21)	GRU	Low Earth		In orbit	Operational
19 April	(Soviet Union) Soyuz U		(Soviet Union) Plesetsk Site 41/1		(Soviet Union)	
19 April	(Soviet Union) Kosmos 1647 (Yantar-4K2 №14/Kobalt №14)	GRU	Low Earth	Reconnaissance	In orbit	Operational
25 April	(Soviet Union) Soyuz U		(Soviet Union) Plesetsk Site 43/4		(Soviet Union)	
25 April	(Soviet Union) Kosmos 1648 (Zenit-8 №14/Oblik №14)	GRU	Low Earth	Reconnaissance	In orbit	Operational
26 April	(Soviet Union) Molniya-M / Blok-SO-L		(Soviet Union) Baikonur Site 31/6		(Soviet Union)	
26 April	(Soviet Union) (Czechoslovak Socialist Republic) Interkosmos 23 (Prognoz №10)	Interkosmos/NPO Lavochkin	Molniya	Magnetosphere research	In orbit	Operational
29 April; 16:02	(United States) Space Shuttle Challenger		(United States) Kennedy LC-39A		(United States) United Space Alliance	
29 April; 16:02	(United States) STS-51-B	NASA	Low Earth	Microgravity research	6 May; 16:11	Successful
29 April; 16:02	(United States) Spacelab Long Module 1	NASA/ESRO	Low Earth (Challenger)	Microgravity research	6 May; 16:11	Successful
29 April; 16:02	(United States) GLOMR	DARPA	Intended: Low Earth	Getaway Special	6 May; 16:11	Deployment failure
29 April; 16:02	(United States) NUSAT		Low Earth	Getaway Special	15 December	Successful
29 April; 16:02	Crewed orbital flight with seven astronauts; GLOMR failed to deploy from its GAS canister					
← Jan; Feb; Mar; Apr; May; Jun; Jul; Aug; Sep; Oct; Nov; Dec →; === May ===
8 May; 01:15	(France) Ariane 3		(France) Kourou ELA-1		(France) Arianespace	
8 May; 01:15	(United States) GStar 1	GTE Spacenet	Geosynchronous	Communications	In orbit	Successful
8 May; 01:15	(France) Télécom 1B	France Télécom	Geosynchronous	Communications	In orbit	Successful
15 May	(Soviet Union) Soyuz U		(Soviet Union) Plesetsk Site 43/4		(Soviet Union)	
15 May	(Soviet Union) Kosmos 1649 (Zenit-8 №15/Oblik №15)	GRU	Low Earth	Reconnaissance	In orbit	Operational
17 May	(Soviet Union) Proton-K Blok-DM-2		(Soviet Union) Baikonur Site 200/39		(Soviet Union)	
17 May	(Soviet Union) Kosmos 1650 (GLONASS №10)	NPO PM	Medium Earth	Navigation	In orbit	Operational
17 May	(Soviet Union) Kosmos 1651 (GLONASS №11)	NPO PM	Medium Earth	Navigation	In orbit	Operational
17 May	(Soviet Union) Kosmos 1652 (GLONASS-GVM №7)		Medium Earth	Dummy satellite	In orbit	Operational
22 May	(Soviet Union) Soyuz U		(Soviet Union) Plesetsk Site 41/1		(Soviet Union)	
22 May	(Soviet Union) Kosmos 1653 (Resurs-F1 №22)		Low Earth (SSO)	Earth Observation	In orbit	Operational
23 May	(Soviet Union) Soyuz U		(Soviet Union) Baikonur Site 31/6		(Soviet Union)	
23 May	(Soviet Union) Kosmos 1654 (Yantar-4K2 №15/Kobalt №15)	GRU	Low Earth	Reconnaissance	In orbit	Operational
29 May	(Soviet Union) Molniya-M / Blok-ML		(Soviet Union) Plesetsk Site 43/4		(Soviet Union)	
29 May	(Soviet Union) Molniya-3 39L	NPO PM	Molniya	Communications	In orbit	Operational
30 May	(Soviet Union) Kosmos-3M		(Soviet Union) Plesetsk Site 132/1		(Soviet Union)	
30 May	(Soviet Union) Kosmos 1655 (Tsikada №12)	NPO PM	Low Earth	Navigation	In orbit	Operational
30 May	(Soviet Union) Proton-K Blok-DM-2		(Soviet Union) Baikonur Site 200/40		(Soviet Union)	
30 May	(Soviet Union) Kosmos 1656 (Tselina-2 №2)		Low Earth	SIGINT	In orbit	Operational
← Jan; Feb; Mar; Apr; May; Jun; Jul; Aug; Sep; Oct; Nov; Dec →; === June ===
6 June; 06:39	(Soviet Union) Soyuz-U2		(Soviet Union) Baikonur Site 1/5		(Soviet Union)	
6 June; 06:39	(Soviet Union) Soyuz T-13		Low Earth (Salyut 7)	Salyut 7 EO-4	26 September; 09:51	Successful
6 June; 06:39	Crewed orbital flight with two cosmonauts					
7 June	(Soviet Union) Soyuz U		(Soviet Union) Plesetsk Site 43/4		(Soviet Union)	
7 June	(Soviet Union) Kosmos 1657 (Resurs-F1 №23)		Low Earth	Earth Observation	In orbit	Operational
11 June	(Soviet Union) Molniya-M / Blok-2BL		(Soviet Union) Plesetsk Site 41/1		(Soviet Union)	
11 June	(Soviet Union) Kosmos 1658 (US-K №39)		Molniya	Early warning	In orbit	Operational
13 June	(Soviet Union) Soyuz U		(Soviet Union) Plesetsk Site 16/2		(Soviet Union)	
13 June	(Soviet Union) Kosmos 1659 (Zenit-8 №16/Oblik №16)	GRU	Low Earth	Reconnaissance	In orbit	Operational
14 June	(Soviet Union) Tsyklon-3		(Soviet Union) Baikonur Site 32/1		(Soviet Union)	
14 June	(Soviet Union) Kosmos 1660 (Geo-IK №6/Musson №6)	NPO PM	Low Earth	Geodesy	In orbit	Operational
17 June; 11:33	(United States) Space Shuttle Discovery / PAM-D		(United States) Kennedy LC-39A		(United States) United Space Alliance	
17 June; 11:33	(United States) STS-51-G	NASA	Low Earth	Satellite deployment	24 June; 13:11	Successful
17 June; 11:33	(Mexico) Morelos 1	Morelos	Geosynchronous	Communications	In orbit	Successful
17 June; 11:33	(Saudi Arabia) Arabsat-1B	Arabsat	Geosynchronous	Communications	In orbit	Successful
17 June; 11:33	(United States) Telstar 303	AT&T	Geosynchronous	Communications	In orbit	Successful
17 June; 11:33	(United States) Spartan 101	NASA	Low Earth	Astronomy	24 June; 13:11	Successful
17 June; 11:33	Crewed orbital flight with seven astronauts including the first Saudi Arabian space traveller and member of royalty to fly in space (Sultan bin Salman bin Abdulaziz Al Saud); Arabsat 1B retired in 1993.					
18 June	(Soviet Union) Molniya-M / Blok-2BL		(Soviet Union) Plesetsk Site 16/2		(Soviet Union)	
18 June	(Soviet Union) Kosmos 1661 (US-K №40)		Molniya	Early warning	In orbit	Operational
19 June	(Soviet Union) Kosmos-3M		(Soviet Union) Plesetsk Site 132/2		(Soviet Union)	
19 June	(Soviet Union) Kosmos 1662 (Taifun-2 №20)		Low Earth	Radar calibration	In orbit	Operational
19 June	(Soviet Union) 23 Romb		Low Earth		In orbit	Operational
21 June; 00:39	(Soviet Union) Soyuz-U		(Soviet Union) Baikonur Site 1/5		(Soviet Union)	
21 June; 00:39	(Soviet Union) Progress 24		Low Earth (Salyut 7)	Logistics	15 July; 22:33	Successful
21 June	(Soviet Union) Soyuz U		(Soviet Union) Plesetsk Site 41/1		(Soviet Union)	
21 June	(Soviet Union) Kosmos 1663 (Resurs-F1 №24)		Low Earth (SSO)	Earth Observation	In orbit	Operational
21 June	(Soviet Union) Zenit-2		(Soviet Union) Baikonur Site 45		(Soviet Union)	
21 June	(Soviet Union) Kosmos (EPN 03.0694 №2)		Low Earth	Vehicle Evaluation	In orbit	Partial Failure
26 June	(Soviet Union) Soyuz U		(Soviet Union) Plesetsk Site 43/4		(Soviet Union)	
26 June	(Soviet Union) Kosmos 1664 (Zenit-8 №17/Oblik №17)	GRU	Low Earth	Reconnaissance	In orbit	Operational
30 June; 00:44	(United States) Atlas G / Centaur-D1AR	AC-64	(United States) Cape Canaveral LC-36B		(United States)	
30 June; 00:44	(United Nations) Intelsat VA F-11 (Intelsat 511)	Intelsat	Geosynchronous	Communications	In orbit	Successful
← Jan; Feb; Mar; Apr; May; Jun; Jul; Aug; Sep; Oct; Nov; Dec →; === July ===
2 July; 11:23	(France) Ariane 1		(France) Kourou ELA-1		(France) Arianespace	
2 July; 11:23	Giotto	ESA	Heliocentric	Flyby of Halley's Comet	In orbit	Successful
2 July; 11:23	Closest approach of Halley's Comet (596 kilometres (370 mi)) achieved on 13 March 1986; Closest approach of 26P/Grigg-Skjellerup (200 kilometres (120 mi)) achieved on 10 July 1992					
3 July	(Soviet Union) Soyuz U		(Soviet Union) Plesetsk Site 16/2		(Soviet Union)	
3 July	(Soviet Union) Kosmos 1665 (Zenit-8 №18/Oblik №18)	GRU	Low Earth	Reconnaissance	In orbit	Operational
8 July	(Soviet Union) Tsyklon-3		(Soviet Union) Plesetsk Site 32/2		(Soviet Union)	
8 July	(Soviet Union) Kosmos 1666 (Tselina-D №49)		Low Earth	SIGINT	In orbit	Operational
10 July	(Soviet Union) Soyuz U		(Soviet Union) Plesetsk Site 41/1		(Soviet Union)	
10 July	(Soviet Union) Kosmos 1667 (Bion №7)		Low Earth	Life Science	In orbit	Operational
15 July	(Soviet Union) Soyuz U		(Soviet Union) Baikonur Site 31/6		(Soviet Union)	
15 July	(Soviet Union) Kosmos 1668 (Zenit-8 №19/Oblik №19)	GRU	Low Earth	Reconnaissance	In orbit	Operational
17 July	(Soviet Union) Molniya-M / Blok-ML		(Soviet Union) Plesetsk Site 43/4		(Soviet Union)	
17 July	(Soviet Union) Molniya-3 37L	NPO PM	Molniya	Communications	In orbit	Operational
19 July; 13:05	(Soviet Union) Soyuz-U		(Soviet Union) Baikonur Site 1/5		(Soviet Union)	
19 July; 13:05	(Soviet Union) Kosmos 1669 (Progress)		Low Earth (Salyut 7)	Logistics	30 August; 01:20	Successful
29 July; 21:00	(United States) Space Shuttle Challenger		(United States) Kennedy LC-39A		(United States) United Space Alliance	
29 July; 21:00	(United States) STS-51-F	NASA	Low Earth	Astronomical experiments	6 August; 19:45	Successful
29 July; 21:00	(United States) PDP	NASA	Low Earth	Plasma research	6 August; 19:45	Successful
29 July; 21:00	(United States) Spacelab 2 (three pallets)	NASA/ESRO	Low Earth (Challenger)	Astronomy	6 August; 19:45	Successful
29 July; 21:00	Crewed orbital flight with seven astronauts; A main engine shut-down during ascent caused an Abort to Orbit, the first (and only) abort of the Space Shuttle program.					
← Jan; Feb; Mar; Apr; May; Jun; Jul; Aug; Sep; Oct; Nov; Dec →; === August ===
1 August	(Soviet Union) Tsyklon-2		(Soviet Union) Baikonur Site 90		(Soviet Union)	
1 August	(Soviet Union) Kosmos 1670 (US-A №26)		Low Earth	Ocean Surveillance	In orbit	Operational
2 August	(Soviet Union) Soyuz U		(Soviet Union) Plesetsk Site 16/2		(Soviet Union)	
2 August	(Soviet Union) Kosmos 1671 (Zenit-8 №20/Oblik №20)	GRU	Low Earth	Reconnaissance	In orbit	Operational
3 August	(United States) Scout-G 1		(United States) Vandenberg SLC-5		(United States)	
3 August	(United States) Transit-O 24	US Navy	Low Earth	Navigation	In orbit	Operational
3 August	(United States) Transit-O 30	US Navy	Low Earth	Navigation	In orbit	Operational
7 August	(Soviet Union) Soyuz U		(Soviet Union) Plesetsk Site 43/4		(Soviet Union)	
7 August	(Soviet Union) Kosmos 1672 (Resurs-F1 №25)		Low Earth (SSO)	Earth observation	In orbit	Operational
8 August	(Soviet Union) Soyuz U		(Soviet Union) Baikonur Site 1/5		(Soviet Union)	
8 August	(Soviet Union) Kosmos 1673 (Yantar-1KFT №5/Kometa №5)	GRU	Low Earth	Reconnaissance	In orbit	Operational
8 August	(Soviet Union) Tsyklon-3		(Soviet Union) Plesetsk Site 32/1		(Soviet Union)	
8 August	(Soviet Union) Kosmos 1674 (Tselina-D №50)		Low Earth	SIGINT	In orbit	Operational
8 August	(Soviet Union) Proton-K Blok-DM		(Soviet Union) Baikonur Site 200/39		(Soviet Union)	
8 August	(Soviet Union) Raduga 16 (Gran 26L)	NPO PM	Geosynchronous	Communications	In orbit	Operational
12 August	(Soviet Union) Molniya-M / Blok-2BL		(Soviet Union) Plesetsk Site 16/2		(Soviet Union)	
12 August	(Soviet Union) Kosmos 1675 (US-K №41)		Molniya	Early warning	In orbit	Operational
16 August	(Soviet Union) Soyuz U		(Soviet Union) Plesetsk Site 41/1		(Soviet Union)	
16 August	(Soviet Union) Kosmos 1676 (Yantar-4K2 №16/Kobalt №16)	GRU	Low Earth	Reconnaissance	In orbit	Operational
18 August; 23:33	(Japan) M-3SII / KM-P	M-3SII-2	(Japan) Kagoshima LP-M		(Japan) ISAS	
18 August; 23:33	(Japan) Suisei (Planet A)	ISAS	Heliocentric	1P/Halley comet flyby	22 February 1991	Successful
22 August	(Soviet Union) Molniya-M / Blok-ML		(Soviet Union) Plesetsk Site 41/1		(Soviet Union)	
22 August	(Soviet Union) Molniya-1T 64 (Molniya-1T 74L)	NPO PM	Molniya	Communications	In orbit	Operational
23 August	(Soviet Union) Tsyklon-2		(Soviet Union) Baikonur Site 90		(Soviet Union)	
23 August	(Soviet Union) Kosmos 1677 (US-A №27)		Low Earth	Reconnaissance	In orbit	Operational
27 August; 10:58	(United States) Space Shuttle Discovery / PAM-D		(United States) Kennedy LC-39A		(United States) United Space Alliance	
27 August; 10:58	(United States) STS-51-I	NASA	Low Earth	Satellite deployment and repair	3 September; 13:15	Successful
27 August; 10:58	(Australia) Aussat A1	Aussat Pty Ltd	Geosynchronous	Communications	In orbit	Successful
27 August; 10:58	(United States) ASC-1	ASC	Geosynchronous	Communications	In orbit	Successful
27 August; 10:58	(United States) Leasat 4 (Syncom-4 4)	US Navy	Geosynchronous	Communications	In orbit	Spacecraft failure
27 August; 10:58	Crewed orbital flight with five astronauts Leasat 4 failed in orbit after becoming operational for a short period Retrieved Leasat 3, deployed by STS-51-D in April and repaired the malfunctioning perigee motor to allow the satellite to reach geosynchronous orbit.					
28 August; 21:20	(United States) Titan 34D		(United States) Vandenberg SLC-4E		(United States)	
28 August; 21:20	(United States) KH-11 7 (Crystal 7)	NRO	Intended: Sun-synchronous	Reconnaissance	28 August	Launch Failure
28 August; 21:20	First stage propellant feed malfunction					
29 August	(Soviet Union) Soyuz U		(Soviet Union) Plesetsk Site 41/1		(Soviet Union)	
29 August	(Soviet Union) Kosmos 1678 (Resurs-F1 №26)		Low Earth (SSO)	Earth observation	In orbit	Operational
29 August	(Soviet Union) Soyuz U		(Soviet Union) Baikonur Site 31/6		(Soviet Union)	
29 August	(Soviet Union) Kosmos 1679 (Yantar-4K2 №17/Kobalt №17)	GRU	Low Earth	Reconnaissance	In orbit	Operational
← Jan; Feb; Mar; Apr; May; Jun; Jul; Aug; Sep; Oct; Nov; Dec →; === September ===
4 September	(Soviet Union) Kosmos-3M		(Soviet Union) Plesetsk Site 132/1		(Soviet Union)	
4 September	(Soviet Union) Kosmos 1680 (Strela-2M №27)	NPO PM	Low Earth	Military communications	In orbit	Operational
6 September	(Soviet Union) Soyuz U		(Soviet Union) Plesetsk Site 41/1		(Soviet Union)	
6 September	(Soviet Union) Kosmos 1681 (Zenit-4MKT №27/Fram №27)	GRU	Low Earth	Reconnaissance	In orbit	Operational
12 September; 23:26	(France) Ariane 3		(France) Kourou ELA		(France) Arianespace	
12 September; 23:26	(France) Eutelsat I F-3 (ECS-3)	Eutelsat	Intended: Geosynchronous	Communications	12 September	Launch Failure
12 September; 23:26	(United States) Spacenet F3	Spacenet	Intended: Geosynchronous	Communications	12 September	Launch Failure
12 September; 23:26	Third stage failed to ignite					
17 September; 12:38	(Soviet Union) Soyuz-U2		(Soviet Union) Baikonur Site 1/5		(Soviet Union)	
17 September; 12:38	(Soviet Union) Soyuz T-14		Low Earth (Salyut 7)	Salyut 7 EP-5	21 November; 10:31	Successful
17 September; 12:38	Crewed orbital flight with three cosmonauts					
19 September	(Soviet Union) Tsyklon-2		(Soviet Union) Baikonur Site 90		(Soviet Union)	
19 September	(Soviet Union) Kosmos 1682 (US-P №22)		Low Earth	Reconnaissance	In orbit	Operational
19 September	(Soviet Union) Soyuz U		(Soviet Union) Plesetsk Site 41/1		(Soviet Union)	
19 September	(Soviet Union) Kosmos 1683 (Zenit-8 №21/Oblik №21)	GRU	Low Earth	Reconnaissance	In orbit	Operational
24 September	(Soviet Union) Molniya-M / Blok-2BL		(Soviet Union) Plesetsk Site 43/4		(Soviet Union)	
24 September	(Soviet Union) Kosmos 1684 (US-K №42)		Molniya	Early warning	In orbit	Operational
26 September	(Soviet Union) Soyuz U		(Soviet Union) Baikonur Site 16/2		(Soviet Union)	
26 September	(Soviet Union) Kosmos 1685 (Zenit-8 №22/Oblik №22)	GRU	Low Earth	Reconnaissance	In orbit	Operational
27 September; 08:41	(Soviet Union) Proton-K		(Soviet Union) Baikonur Site 200/39		(Soviet Union)	
27 September; 08:41	(Soviet Union) Kosmos 1686 (TKS-M №1)		Low Earth (Salyut 7)	Logistics	7 February 1991	Successful
27 September; 08:41	TKS-4; remained docked with Salyut 7 through that station's re-entry					
28 September; 23:17	(United States) Atlas G		(United States) Cape Canaveral LC-36B		(United States)	
28 September; 23:17	(United Nations) Intelsat VA F-11 (Intelsat 512)	Intelsat	Geosynchronous	Communications	In orbit	Successful
30 September	(Soviet Union) Molniya-M / Blok-2BL		(Soviet Union) Plesetsk Site 16/2		(Soviet Union)	
30 September	(Soviet Union) Kosmos 1687 (US-K №43)		Molniya	Early warning	In orbit	Operational
← Jan; Feb; Mar; Apr; May; Jun; Jul; Aug; Sep; Oct; Nov; Dec →; === October ===
2 October	(Soviet Union) Kosmos-3M		(Soviet Union) Kapustin Yar Site 107		(Soviet Union)	
2 October	(Soviet Union) Kosmos 1688 (Taifun-2 №21)		Low Earth	Radar calibration	In orbit	Operational
2 October	(Soviet Union) O Romb		Low Earth		In orbit	Operational
3 October	(Soviet Union) Vostok-2M		(Soviet Union) Baikonur Site 31/6		(Soviet Union)	
3 October	(Soviet Union) Kosmos 1689 (Resurs-O1 №1)	NPO Planeta	Low Earth	Earth observation	In orbit	Operational
3 October	(Soviet Union) Molniya-M / Blok-ML		(Soviet Union) Plesetsk Site 43/4		(Soviet Union)	
3 October	(Soviet Union) Molniya-3 38L	NPO PM	Molniya	Communications	In orbit	Operational
3 October; 15:15	(United States) Space Shuttle Atlantis / IUS		(United States) Kennedy LC-39A		(United States) United Space Alliance	
3 October; 15:15	(United States) STS-51-J	NASA	Low Earth	Satellite deployment	7 October; 17:00	Successful
3 October; 15:15	(United States) DSCS-III 2 (USA-11)	US Air Force	Geosynchronous	Communications	In orbit	Successful
3 October; 15:15	(United States) DSCS-III 3 (USA-12)	US Air Force	Geosynchronous	Communications	In orbit	Successful
3 October; 15:15	Crewed orbital flight with five astronauts; Maiden flight of Space Shuttle Atlantis					
9 October; 02:53	(United States) Atlas E/SGS-2		(United States) Vandenberg SLC-3W		(United States)	
9 October; 02:53	(United States) GPS-11 (USA-10)	US Air Force	Medium Earth	Navigation	In orbit	Successful
9 October	(Soviet Union) Tsyklon-3		(Soviet Union) Plesetsk Site 32/1		(Soviet Union)	
9 October	(Soviet Union) Kosmos 1690 (Strela-3 №7)	VKS	Low Earth	Military communications	In orbit	Operational
9 October	(Soviet Union) Kosmos 1691 (Strela-3 №8)	VKS	Low Earth	Military communications	In orbit	Operational
9 October	(Soviet Union) Kosmos 1692 (Strela-3 №9)	VKS	Low Earth	Military communications	In orbit	Operational
9 October	(Soviet Union) Kosmos 1693 (Strela-3 №10)	VKS	Low Earth	Military communications	In orbit	Operational
9 October	(Soviet Union) Kosmos 1694 (Strela-3 №11)	VKS	Low Earth	Military communications	In orbit	Operational
9 October	(Soviet Union) Kosmos 1695 (Strela-3 №12)	VKS	Low Earth	Military communications	In orbit	Operational
16 October	(Soviet Union) Soyuz U		(Soviet Union) Baikonur Site 31/6		(Soviet Union)	
16 October	(Soviet Union) Kosmos 1696 (Zenit-8 №23/Oblik №23)	GRU	Low Earth	Reconnaissance	In orbit	Operational
21 October	(China) Long March 2C	2C-Y4	(China) Jiuquan LA-2B		(China) CASC	
21 October	(China) FSW-0 7	CAST	Low Earth	Reconnaissance	In orbit	Operational
22 October	(Soviet Union) Zenit-2		(Soviet Union) Baikonur Site 45/1		(Soviet Union)	
22 October	(Soviet Union) Kosmos 1697 (EPN 03.0694 №3)		Low Earth	Vehicle Evaluation	In orbit	Operational
22 October	(Soviet Union) Molniya-M / Blok-2BL		(Soviet Union) Plesetsk Site 43/4		(Soviet Union)	
22 October	(Soviet Union) Kosmos 1698 (US-K №44)		Molniya	Early warning	In orbit	Operational
23 October	(Soviet Union) Molniya-M / Blok-ML		(Soviet Union) Baikonur Site 1/5		(Soviet Union)	
23 October	(Soviet Union) Molniya-1T 65 (Molniya-1T 73L)	NPO PM	Molniya	Communications	In orbit	Operational
23 October	(Soviet Union) Kosmos-3M		(Soviet Union) Plesetsk Site 133/3		(Soviet Union)	
23 October	(Soviet Union) Kosmos (Parus №50)	NPO PM	Low Earth	Navigation	In orbit	Failure
24 October	(Soviet Union) Tsyklon-3		(Soviet Union) Plesetsk Site 32/1		(Soviet Union)	
24 October	(Soviet Union) Meteor-3 1	VNIEM	Low Earth	Meteorology	In orbit	Operational
25 October	(Soviet Union) Soyuz U		(Soviet Union) Plesetsk Site 16/2		(Soviet Union)	
25 October	(Soviet Union) Kosmos 1699 (Yantar-4K2 №18/Kobalt №18)	GRU	Low Earth	Reconnaissance	In orbit	Operational
25 October	(Soviet Union) Proton-K / Blok-DM-2		(Soviet Union) Baikonur Site 200/40		(Soviet Union)	
25 October	(Soviet Union) Kosmos 1700 (Luch №1/Altair 11L)	NPO PM	Geosynchronous	Communications	In orbit	Operational
28 October	(Soviet Union) Molniya-M / Blok-ML		(Soviet Union) Plesetsk Site 43/4		(Soviet Union)	
28 October	(Soviet Union) Molniya-1T 66 (Molniya-1T 76L)	NPO PM	Molniya	Communications	In orbit	Operational
30 October; 17:00	(United States) Space Shuttle Challenger		(United States) Kennedy LC-39A		(United States) United Space Alliance	
30 October; 17:00	(United States) STS-61-A	NASA	Low Earth	Microgravity research	6 November; 17:44	Successful
30 October; 17:00	(United States) Spacelab Long Module 2	NASA	Low Earth (Challenger)	Spacelab D1	6 November; 17:44	Successful
30 October; 17:00	(Germany) GLOMAR	DLR	Low Earth	Getaway Special	26 December 1986	Successful
30 October; 17:00	Crewed orbital flight with eight astronauts Maiden flight of Spacelab Long Module #2					
← Jan; Feb; Mar; Apr; May; Jun; Jul; Aug; Sep; Oct; Nov; Dec →; === November ===
9 November	(Soviet Union) Molniya-M / Blok-2BL		(Soviet Union) Plesetsk Site 41/1		(Soviet Union)	
9 November	(Soviet Union) Kosmos 1701 (US-K №45)	NPO PM	Molniya	Early warning	In orbit	Operational
13 November	(Soviet Union) Soyuz U		(Soviet Union) Plesetsk Site 16/2		(Soviet Union)	
13 November	(Soviet Union) Kosmos 1702 (Zenit-8 №24/Oblik №24)	GRU	Low Earth	Reconnaissance	In orbit	Operational
15 November	(Soviet Union) Proton-K / Blok-DM		(Soviet Union) Baikonur Site 200/39		(Soviet Union)	
15 November	(Soviet Union) Raduga 17 (Gran 28L)	NPO PM	Geosynchronous	Communications	In orbit	Operational
22 November	(Soviet Union) Tsyklon-3		(Soviet Union) Plesetsk Site 32/2		(Soviet Union)	
22 November	(Soviet Union) Kosmos 1703 (Tselina-D №51)	Yuzhnoye	Low Earth	SIGINT	In orbit	Operational
27 November; 00:29	(United States) Space Shuttle Atlantis / IUS		(United States) Kennedy LC-39A		(United States) United Space Alliance	
27 November; 00:29	(United States) STS-61-B	NASA	Low Earth	Satellite deployment	2 December; 21:33	Successful
27 November; 00:29	(Mexico) Morelos 2	Morelos	Geosynchronous	Communications	In orbit	Successful
27 November; 00:29	(Australia) Aussat A2	Aussat Pty Ltd	Geosynchronous	Communications	In orbit	Successful
27 November; 00:29	(United States) Satcom K2	RCA Americom	Geosynchronous	Communications	In orbit	Successful
27 November; 00:29	(United States) OEX Target	NASA	Low Earth		2 March 1987	Successful
27 November; 00:29	(United States) EASE/ACCESS	NASA	Low Earth (Atlantis)	Structure assembly experiment	2 December; 21:33	Successful
27 November; 00:29	Crewed orbital flight with seven astronauts including the first Mexican space traveller.					
28 November	(Soviet Union) Kosmos-3M		(Soviet Union) Plesetsk Site 133/3		(Soviet Union)	
28 November	(Soviet Union) Kosmos 1704 (Parus №51)	NPO PM	Low Earth	Navigation	In orbit	Operational
← Jan; Feb; Mar; Apr; May; Jun; Jul; Aug; Sep; Oct; Nov; Dec →; === December ===
3 December	(Soviet Union) Soyuz U		(Soviet Union) Plesetsk Site 16/2		(Soviet Union)	
3 December	(Soviet Union) Kosmos 1705 (Zenit-8 №25/Oblik №25)	GRU	Low Earth	Reconnaissance	In orbit	Operational
11 December	(Soviet Union) Soyuz U		(Soviet Union) Plesetsk Site 16/2		(Soviet Union)	
11 December	(Soviet Union) Kosmos 1706 (Yantar-4K2 №19/Kobalt №19)	GRU	Low Earth	Reconnaissance	In orbit	Operational
12 December	(Soviet Union) Tsyklon-3		(Soviet Union) Plesetsk Site 32/1		(Soviet Union)	
12 December	(Soviet Union) Kosmos 1707 (Tselina-D №52)	Yuzhnoye	Low Earth	SIGINT	In orbit	Operational
13 December	(United States) Scout-G 1		(United States) Wallops LA-3		(United States)	
13 December	(United States) ITV 1 (USA-13)	USAF	Low Earth	ASAT Target	In orbit	Operational
13 December	(United States) ITV 2 (USA-14)	USAF	Low Earth	ASAT Target	In orbit	Operational
13 December	(Soviet Union) Soyuz U		(Soviet Union) Plesetsk Site 43/4		(Soviet Union)	
13 December	(Soviet Union) Kosmos 1708 (Resurs-F1 №)		Low Earth (SSO)	Earth observation	In orbit	Operational
19 December	(Soviet Union) Kosmos-3M		(Soviet Union) Plesetsk Site 132/1		(Soviet Union)	
19 December	(Soviet Union) Kosmos 1709 (Parus №52)	NPO PM	Low Earth	Navigation	In orbit	Operational
24 December	(Soviet Union) Molniya-M / Blok-ML		(Soviet Union) Plesetsk Site 43/4		(Soviet Union)	
24 December	(Soviet Union) Molniya-3 40L	NPO PM	Molniya	Communications	In orbit	Operational
24 December	(Soviet Union) Proton-K / Blok-DM-2		(Soviet Union) Baikonur Site 200/39		(Soviet Union)	
24 December	(Soviet Union) Kosmos 1710 (GLONASS №12)	NPO PM	Medium Earth	Navigation	In orbit	Operational
24 December	(Soviet Union) Kosmos 1711 (GLONASS №13)	NPO PM	Medium Earth	Navigation	In orbit	Operational
24 December	(Soviet Union) Kosmos 1712 (GLONASS-GVM №8)		Medium Earth	Dummy Satellite	In orbit	Operational
26 December	(Soviet Union) Tsyklon-3		(Soviet Union) Plesetsk Site 32/1		(Soviet Union)	
26 December	(Soviet Union) Meteor-2 13	VNIEM	Low Earth	Meteorology	In orbit	Operational
27 December	(Soviet Union) Soyuz U		(Soviet Union) Plesetsk Site 41/1		(Soviet Union)	
27 December	(Soviet Union) Kosmos 1713 (Efir №2)		Low Earth	Cosmic radiation	In orbit	Operational
28 December	(Soviet Union) Zenit-2		(Soviet Union) Baikonur Site 45		(Soviet Union)	
28 December	(Soviet Union) Kosmos 1714 (Tselina-2 №3)	Yuzhnoye	Low Earth	SIGINT	In orbit	Partial Failure
← Jan; Feb; Mar; Apr; May; Jun; Jul; Aug; Sep; Oct; Nov; Dec →

- ← Jan
- Feb
- Mar
- Apr
- May
- Jun
- Jul
- Aug
- Sep
- Oct
- Nov
- Dec →

== Suborbital flights ==
Date and time (UTC)	Rocket	Flight number	Launch site		LSP	
Date and time (UTC)	Payload (⚀ = CubeSat)	Operator	Orbit	Function	Decay (UTC)	Outcome
Date and time (UTC)	Remarks					
13 September	(United States) ASM-135 ASAT		(United States) Celestial Eagle, Vandenberg		(United States) US Air Force	
13 September		US Air Force	Suborbital	Anti-satellite weapon	13 September	Successful
13 September	Successful intercept and destruction of Solwind P78-1.					

== Deep Space Rendezvous ==
Date (GMT)	Spacecraft	Event	Remarks
11 June	Vega 1	delivered lander and balloon on Venus	
15 June	Vega 2	delivered lander and balloon on Venus	
11 September	ISEE-3/ICE	Flyby of 21P/Giacobini-Zinner	

== EVAs ==
Start date/time	Duration	End time	Spacecraft	Crew	Remarks
16 April	3 hours 6 minutes		STS-51-D; Discovery	(United States) Jeffrey A. Hoffman (United States) S. David Griggs	Installed an improvised switch-pulling tool, called the Flyswatter, on the RMS robotic arm. The Flyswatter was used in an effort to push the sequencer start lever on the Leasat-3 in the proper position for deployment. This attempted repair was the first unplanned spacewalk in NASA history.
2 August; 07:15	5 hours	12:15	Salyut 7 EO-4	(Soviet Union) Vladimir Dzhanibekov (Soviet Union) Viktor Savinykh	Installed a third pair of solar arrays on exterior of Salyut 7.
31 August	7 hours 20 minutes		STS-51-I; Discovery	(United States) William Fisher (United States) James van Hoften	Van Hoften rode the RMS to capture the Leasat 3 satellite and pulled it into payload bay. Fisher and Van Hoften secured and started repairs on the satellite in the payload bay. The retrieval was complicated by a malfunction of the RMS that made operation of the arm more complicated.
1 September	4 hours 26 minutes		STS-51-I; Discovery	(United States) William Fisher (United States) James van Hoften	Completed repairs on the Leasat 3 satellite. Then Van Hoften, riding the RMS, heaved the satellite out of the payload bay, imparting the required spin needed to fire the perigee motor.
29 November	5 hours 32 minutes		STS-61-B; Atlantis	(United States) Jerry L. Ross (United States) Sherwood C. Spring	Practiced construction techniques in the payload bay and assembled and disassembled the two experimental EASE/ACCESS structures.
1 December	6 hours 41 minutes		STS-61-B; Atlantis	(United States) Jerry L. Ross (United States) Sherwood C. Spring	Conducted supplementary experiments on the EASE and ACCESS structures, including a test of the RMS to aid in the construction experiments.
