= List of uncrewed spaceflights to Salyut space stations =

This is a list of uncrewed spaceflights to the Salyut space stations. The list includes Soyuz 34, which was launched uncrewed but landed crewed, however it does not include Soyuz 32, which was launched crewed, but landed uncrewed.

Prior to the launch of Salyut 6, the only uncrewed spaceflights of the Salyut programme were the stations themselves, and the Soyuz 20 spacecraft, which docked with Salyut 4.

== Salyut 4 ==
Spacecraft	Mission	Carrier rocket	Launch (UTC)	Port	Docked (UTC)	Undocked (UTC)	Time docked	Deorbit (UTC)	Remarks
Soyuz 20	Test	Soyuz-U	17 November 1975; 14:38	Salyut 4	19 November 1975; 16:19	15 February 1976; 23:07	88 d, 6 h, 49 m	16 February 1976	

== Salyut 6 ==
Spacecraft	Mission	Carrier rocket	Launch (UTC)	Port	Docked (UTC)	Undocked (UTC)	Time docked	Deorbit (UTC)	Remarks
Progress 1	Logistics	Soyuz-U	20 January 1978; 08:24	Aft	22 January 1978; 10:12	6 February 1978; 19:24	15 d, 9 h, 12 m	8 February 1978; 02:39	
Progress 2	Logistics	Soyuz-U	7 July 1978; 11:26	Aft	9 July 1978; 12:58	2 August 1978; 04:57	23 d, 15 h, 59 m	4 August 1978; 01:31	
Progress 3	Logistics	Soyuz-U	7 August 1978; 22:31	Aft	9 August 1978; 23:59	21 August 1978; 15:42	11 d, 15 h, 43 m	23 August 1978; 16:45	
Progress 4	Logistics	Soyuz-U	3 October 1978; 23:09	Aft	6 October 1978; 01:00	24 October 1978; 13:01	18 d, 12 h, 1 m	26 October 1978; 16:28	
Progress 5	Logistics	Soyuz-U	12 March 1979; 05:47	Aft	14 March 1979; 07:19	3 April 1979; 16:10	20 d, 8 h, 51 m	5 April 1979; 00:10	
Progress 6	Logistics	Soyuz-U	13 May 1979; 04:17	Aft	15 May 1979; 06:19	8 June 1979; 07:59	24 d, 1 h, 40 m	9 June 1979; 18:52	
Soyuz 34	Crew return	Soyuz-U	6 June 1979; 18:12	Aft	8 June 1979; 20:03	14 June 1979; 16:18	5 d, 20 h, 15 m	19 August 1979; 11:39	Launched uncrewed, landed crewed
Soyuz 34	Crew return	Soyuz-U	6 June 1979; 18:12	Fore	14 June 1979; 17:48	19 August 1979; 11:39	65 d, 17 h, 51 m	19 August 1979; 11:39	Launched uncrewed, landed crewed
Progress 7	Logistics	Soyuz-U	28 June 1979; 09:25	Aft	30 June 1979; 11:18	18 July 1979; 03:49	17 d, 16 h, 31 m	20 July 1979; 01:57	
Soyuz T-1	Test	Soyuz-U	16 December 1979; 21:29	Fore	19 December 1979; 14:05	23 March 1980; 21:04	95 d, 6 h, 59 m	25 March 1980	
Progress 8	Logistics	Soyuz-U	27 March 1980; 18:53	Aft	29 March 1980; 20:01	25 April 1980; 08:04	26 d, 12 h, 3 m	26 April 1980; 06:54	
Progress 9	Logistics	Soyuz-U	27 April 1980; 06:24	Aft	29 April 1980; 08:09	20 May 1980; 18:51	20 d, 10 h, 42 m	22 May 1980; 00:44	
Progress 10	Logistics	Soyuz-U	29 June 1980; 04:40	Aft	1 July 1980; 05:53	17 July 1980; 22:21	16 d, 16 h, 28 m	19 July 1980; 01:47	
Progress 11	Logistics	Soyuz-U	28 September 1980; 15:09	Aft	30 September 1980; 17:03	9 December 1980; 10:23	69 d, 17 h, 20 m	11 December 1980; 14:00	
Progress 12	Logistics	Soyuz-U	24 January 1981; 14:18	Aft	26 January 1981; 15:56	19 March 1981; 18:14	52 d, 2 h, 18 m	20 March 1981; 16:58	
Kosmos 1267	Test	Proton-K	25 April 1981; 02:01	Aft	19 June 1981; 06:52	N/A	1 y, 40 d (Note: Time from docking until reentry of station)	29 July 1982 (Note: Remained attached during deorbit of space station.)	TKS

== Salyut 7 ==
Spacecraft	Mission	Carrier rocket	Launch (UTC)	Port	Docked (UTC)	Undocked (UTC)	Time docked	Deorbit (UTC)	Remarks
Progress 13	Logistics	Soyuz-U	23 May 1982; 05:58	Aft	25 May 1982; 07:56	4 June 1982; 06:31	9 d, 22 h, 35 m	6 June 1982; 00:05	
Progress 14	Logistics	Soyuz-U	10 July 1982; 09:57	Aft	12 July 1982; 11:41	10 August 1982; 22:11	29 d, 10 h, 30 m	13 August 1982; 01:29	
Progress 15	Logistics	Soyuz-U	18 September 1982; 04:58	Aft	20 September 1982; 06:12	14 October 1982; 13:46	24 d, 7 h, 34 m	16 October 1982; 17:06	
Progress 16	Logistics	Soyuz-U	31 October 1982; 11:20	Aft	2 November 1982; 13:22	13 December 1982; 15:32	41 d, 2 h, 10 m	14 December 1982; 17:17	
Kosmos 1443	Logistics	Proton-K	2 March 1983; 09:37	Fore	10 March 1983; 09:20	14 August 1983; 14:04	157 d, 4 h, 44 m	19 September 1983; 00:28	TKS
Progress 17	Logistics	Soyuz-U	17 August 1983; 12:08	Aft	19 August 1983; 13:47	17 September 1983; 11:44	28 d, 21 h, 57 m	17 September 1983; 23:43	
Progress 18	Logistics	Soyuz-U	20 October 1983; 09:59	Aft	22 October 1983; 11:34	13 November 1983; 03:08	21 d, 15 h, 34 m	16 November 1983; 04:18	
Progress 19	Logistics	Soyuz-U	21 February 1984; 06:46	Aft	23 February 1984; 08:21	31 March 1984; 09:40	27 d, 1 h, 19 m	1 April 1984; 18:18	
Progress 20	Logistics	Soyuz-U2	15 April 1984; 08:12	Aft	17 April 1984; 09:22	6 May 1984; 17:46	50 d, 8 h, 24 m	7 May 1984; 00:32	
Progress 21	Logistics	Soyuz-U	7 May 1984; 22:47	Aft	10 May 1984; 00:10	26 May 1984; 09:41	16 d, 9 h, 31 m	26 May 1984; 15:00	
Progress 22	Logistics	Soyuz-U	28 May 1984; 14:12	Aft	30 May 1984; 15:47	15 July 1984; 13:36	45 d, 21 h, 49 m	15 July 1984; 18:52	
Progress 23	Logistics	Soyuz-U	14 August 1984; 06:28	Aft	16 August 1984; 08:11	26 August 1984; 16:13	10 d, 8 h, 2 m	28 August 1984; 01:28	
Progress 24	Logistics	Soyuz-U	21 June 1985; 00:39	Aft	23 June 1985; 02:54	15 July 1985; 12:28	22 d, 9 h, 34 m	15 July 1985; 22:33	
Kosmos 1669	Logistics	Soyuz-U	19 July 1985; 13:05	Aft	21 July 1985; 15:05	28 August 1985	38 d	30 August 1985; 01:20	Progress
Kosmos 1669	Logistics	Soyuz-U	19 July 1985; 13:05	Aft	28 August 1985	28 August 1985; 21:50	< 1 d	30 August 1985; 01:20	Progress
Kosmos 1686	Logistics; Reboost	Proton-K	27 September 1985; 08:41	Fore	2 October 1985; 10:16	N/A	5 y, 128 d	7 February 1991 (Note: Decayed naturally)	TKS

== See also ==
- Salyut programme
- List of human spaceflights to Salyut space stations
- List of Salyut expeditions
- List of Salyut visitors
- List of Salyut spacewalks
- List of uncrewed spaceflights to Mir
- Uncrewed spaceflights to the International Space Station
- List of space stations
