= Progress 20 =

Soviet unmanned Progress cargo spacecraft

- A Progress 7K-TG spacecraft
- Mission type: Salyut 7 resupply
- COSPAR ID: 1984-038A
- SATCAT no.: 14932

Spacecraft properties
- Spacecraft: Progress (No.121)
- Spacecraft type: Progress 7K-TG
- Manufacturer: NPO Energia

Start of mission
- Launch date: 15 April 1984, 08:12:53 UTC
- Rocket: Soyuz-U2
- Launch site: Baikonur, Site 31/6

End of mission
- Disposal: Deorbited
- Decay date: 7 May 1984, 00:32:51 UTC

Orbital parameters
- Reference system: Geocentric
- Regime: Low Earth
- Perigee altitude: 186 km
- Apogee altitude: 260 km
- Inclination: 51.6°
- Period: 89.0 minutes
- Epoch: 15 April 1984

Docking with Salyut 7
- Docking port: Aft
- Docking date: 17 April 1984, 09:22 UTC
- Undocking date: 6 May 1984, 17:46 UTC

Progress 20 (Russian: Прогресс 20) was a Soviet uncrewed Progress cargo spacecraft, which was launched in April 1984 to resupply the Salyut 7 space station.

== Spacecraft ==
Progress 20 was a Progress 7K-TG spacecraft. The 20th of forty three to be launched, it had the serial number 121. The Progress 7K-TG spacecraft was the first generation Progress, derived from the Soyuz 7K-T and intended for uncrewed logistics missions to space stations in support of the Salyut programme. On some missions the spacecraft were also used to adjust the orbit of the space station.

The Progress spacecraft had a dry mass of 6,520 kilograms (14,370 lb), which increased to around 7,020 kilograms (15,480 lb) when fully fuelled. It measured 7.48 metres (24.5 ft) in length, and 2.72 metres (8 ft 11 in) in diameter. Each spacecraft could accommodate up to 2,500 kilograms (5,500 lb) of payload, consisting of dry cargo and propellant. The spacecraft were powered by chemical batteries, and could operate in free flight for up to three days, remaining docked to the station for up to thirty.

== Launch ==
Progress 20 launched on 15 April 1984 from the Baikonur Cosmodrome in the Kazakh SSR. It used a Soyuz-U2 rocket.

== Docking ==
Progress 20 docked with the aft port of Salyut 7 on 17 April 1984 at 09:22 UTC, and was undocked on 6 May 1984 at 17:46 UTC.

== Decay ==
It remained in orbit until 7 May 1984, when it was deorbited. The deorbit burn occurred at 00:32:51 UTC, with the mission ending at around 01:15 UTC.

== See also ==
- 1984 in spaceflight
- List of Progress missions
- List of uncrewed spaceflights to Salyut space stations
