= Progress 18 =

Soviet unmanned Progress cargo spacecraft

- A Progress 7K-TG spacecraft
- Mission type: Salyut 7 resupply
- COSPAR ID: 1983-106A
- SATCAT no.: 14422

Spacecraft properties
- Spacecraft: Progress (No.118)
- Spacecraft type: Progress 7K-TG
- Manufacturer: NPO Energia

Start of mission
- Launch date: 20 October 1983, 09:59:05 UTC
- Rocket: Soyuz-U
- Launch site: Baikonur, Site 31/6

End of mission
- Disposal: Deorbited
- Decay date: 16 November 1983, 04:18 UTC

Orbital parameters
- Reference system: Geocentric
- Regime: Low Earth
- Perigee altitude: 185 km
- Apogee altitude: 242 km
- Inclination: 51.6°
- Period: 88.8 minutes
- Epoch: 20 October 1983

Docking with Salyut 7
- Docking port: Aft
- Docking date: 22 October 1983, 11:34 UTC
- Undocking date: 13 November 1983, 03:08 UTC

Progress 18 (Russian: Прогресс 18) was a Soviet uncrewed Progress cargo spacecraft, which was launched in October 1983 to resupply the Salyut 7 space station.

== Spacecraft ==
Progress 18 was a Progress 7K-TG spacecraft. The 18th of forty three to be launched, it had the serial number 118. The Progress 7K-TG spacecraft was the first generation Progress, derived from the Soyuz 7K-T and intended for uncrewed logistics missions to space stations in support of the Salyut programme. On some missions the spacecraft were also used to adjust the orbit of the space station.

The Progress spacecraft had a dry mass of 6,520 kilograms (14,370 lb), which increased to around 7,020 kilograms (15,480 lb) when fully fuelled. It measured 7.48 metres (24.5 ft) in length, and 2.72 metres (8 ft 11 in) in diameter. Each spacecraft could accommodate up to 2,500 kilograms (5,500 lb) of payload, consisting of dry cargo and propellant. The spacecraft were powered by chemical batteries, and could operate in free flight for up to three days, remaining docked to the station for up to thirty.

== Launch ==
Progress 18 launched on 20 October 1983 from the Baikonur Cosmodrome in the Kazakh SSR. It used a Soyuz-U rocket.

== Docking ==
Progress 18 docked with the aft port of Salyut 7 on 22 October 1983 at 11:34 UTC, and was undocked on 13 November 1983 at 03:08 UTC.

== Decay ==
It remained in orbit until 16 November 1983, when it was deorbited. The deorbit burn occurred at 04:18 UTC.

== See also ==
- 1983 in spaceflight
- List of Progress missions
- List of uncrewed spaceflights to Salyut space stations
