= 1983 in spaceflight =

Rockets
- Maiden flights: Atlas H Space Shuttle Challenger
- Retirements: Atlas-Centaur SLV-3D

Crewed flights
- Orbital: 6
- Total travellers: 25

1983 in spaceflight

The following is an outline of 1983 in spaceflight.

== Launches ==
- ← Jan
- Feb
- Mar
- Apr
- May
- Jun
- Jul
- Aug
- Sep
- Oct
- Nov
- Dec →

Date and time (UTC)	Rocket	Flight number	Launch site		LSP	
Date and time (UTC)	Payload (⚀ = CubeSat)	Operator	Orbit	Function	Decay (UTC)	Outcome
Date and time (UTC)	Remarks					
=== January ===
20 January; 17:26	(Soviet Union) Vostok-2M		(Soviet Union) Plesetsk Site 16/2		(Soviet Union)	
20 January; 17:26	(Soviet Union) Kosmos 1437 (Tselina-D 39)		Low Earth	ELINT	4 January 2022; 00:04	Successful
=== February ===
9 February; 13:47	(United States) Atlas H		(United States) Vandenberg SLC-3E		(United States)	
9 February; 13:47	(United States) OPS-0252 (NOSS 5)	US Navy	Low Earth	SIGINT	In orbit	Successful
9 February; 13:47	Maiden flight of Atlas H					
=== March ===
2 March; 09:37	(Soviet Union) Proton-K		(Soviet Union) Baikonur Site 200/39		(Soviet Union)	
2 March; 09:37	(Soviet Union) Kosmos 1443 (TKS-3) FGB		Low Earth (Salyut 7)	Logistics	19 September; 00:28	Successful
2 March; 09:37	(Soviet Union) Kosmos-1443 (TKS-3) VA		Low Earth (Salyut 7)	Sample return	23 August	Successful
28 March; 15:52	(United States) Atlas E/Star-37S-ISS		(United States) Vandenberg SLC-3W		(United States)	
28 March; 15:52	(United States) NOAA-8 (NOAA-E)	NOAA	Sun-synchronous	Meteorology	In orbit	Spacecraft failure
28 March; 15:52	Spacecraft failed in June 1984					
=== April ===
4 April; 18:30	(United States) Space Shuttle Challenger		(United States) Kennedy LC-39A		(United States) United Space Alliance	
4 April; 18:30	(United States) STS-6	NASA	Low Earth	Satellite deployment	9 April; 18:53	Successful
4 April; 18:30	(United States) TDRS-1 (TDRS-A)	NASA	Geostationary	Communications	In orbit	Operational
4 April; 18:30	Crewed orbital flight with four astronauts; Maiden flight of Space Shuttle Challenger					
15 April; 18:45	(United States) Titan 24B		(United States) Vandenberg SLC-4W		(United States)	
15 April; 18:45	(United States) OPS-2925 (KH-8-53)	NRO	Sun-synchronous	Reconnaissance	21 August	Successful
20 April; 13:10	(Soviet Union) Soyuz-U		(Soviet Union) Baikonur Site 1/5		(Soviet Union)	
20 April; 13:10	(Soviet Union) Soyuz T-8		Low Earth; Planned: Docked to Salyut 7	Salyut 7 EO-2	22 April; 13:28	Docking failure
20 April; 13:10	Crewed orbital flight with three cosmonauts; Failed to dock with Salyut 7					
=== May ===
19 May; 22:26	(United States) Atlas-Centaur SLV-3D		(United States) Cape Canaveral LC-36A		(United States)	
19 May; 22:26	(United Nations) Intelsat 506	Intelsat	Geosynchronous	Communications	In orbit	Successful
19 May; 22:26	Final flight of Atlas-Centaur SLV-3D					
=== June ===
9 June; 23:23	(United States) Atlas H		(United States) Vandenberg SLC-3E		(United States)	
9 June; 23:23	(United States) OPS-6432 (NOSS 6)	US Navy	Low Earth	SIGINT	In orbit	Successful
16 June; 11:59	(France) Ariane 1		(France) Kourou ELA		(France) CNES	
16 June; 11:59	(France) Eutelsat 1F1	Eutelsat	Geosynchronous	Communications	In orbit	Successful
16 June; 11:59	(West Germany) Oscar 10	AMSAT	Geosynchronous transfer	Amateur radio	In orbit	Successful
16 June; 11:59	Eutelsat 1F1 retired in 1996					
18 June; 11:33	(United States) Space Shuttle Challenger		(United States) Kennedy LC-39A		(United States) United Space Alliance	
18 June; 11:33	(United States) STS-7	NASA	Low Earth	Satellite deployment	24 June; 14:56	Successful
18 June; 11:33	(Canada) Anik C2	Telesat Canada	Current: Graveyard; Operational: Geostationary	Communications	In orbit	Successful
18 June; 11:33	(Indonesia) Palapa B1	Telkom Indonesia	Geostationary	Communications	In orbit	Successful
18 June; 11:33	(West Germany) SPAS-I	NASA	Low Earth (Challenger)	Microgravity research	24 June; 14:56	Successful
18 June; 11:33	(West Germany) (United States) OSTA-2	NASA	Low Earth (Challenger)	Scientific experiments	24 June; 14:56	Successful
18 June; 11:33	Crewed orbital flight with five astronauts; including the first female American astronaut, Sally Ride; Anik C2 retired 7 January 1998					
20 June; 18:45	(United States) Titan 34D		(United States) Vandenberg SLC-4E		(United States)	
20 June; 18:45	(United States) OPS-0721 (KH-9-18)	NRO	Sun-synchronous	Reconnaissance	21 March 1984	Successful
20 June; 18:45	(United States) OPS-3899 (SSF-C-7)	NRO	Sun-synchronous	ELINT	In orbit	Successful
27 June; 09:12	(Soviet Union) Soyuz-U		(Soviet Union) Baikonur Site 1/5		(Soviet Union)	
27 June; 09:12	(Soviet Union) Soyuz T-9		Low Earth (Salyut 7)	Salyut 7 EO-2	23 November; 19:58	Successful
27 June; 09:12	Crewed orbital flight with two cosmonauts					
=== July ===
14 July; 10:21	(United States) Atlas E/SGS-2		(United States) Vandenberg SLC-3W		(United States)	
14 July; 10:21	(United States) GPS-8	US Air Force	Medium Earth	Navigation	In orbit	Successful
31 July; 15:41	(United States) Titan 34B		(United States) Vandenberg SLC-4W		(United States)	
31 July; 15:41	(United States) OPS-7304 (Jumpseat 7)	NRO	Molniya	SIGINT	In orbit	Successful
=== August ===
17 August; 12:08	(Soviet Union) Soyuz-U		(Soviet Union) Baikonur Site 1/5		(Soviet Union)	
17 August; 12:08	(Soviet Union) Progress 17		Low Earth (Salyut 7)	Logistics	17 September; 23:43	Successful
30 August; 06:32	(United States) Space Shuttle Challenger		(United States) Kennedy LC-39A		(United States) United Space Alliance	
30 August; 06:32	(United States) STS-8	NASA	Low Earth	Satellite deployment	5 September; 07:40	Successful
30 August; 06:32	(India) INSAT 1B	ISRO	Geostationary	Communications	In orbit	Successful
30 August; 06:32	(United States) Payload Flight Test Article	NASA	Low Earth (Challenger)	Payload compatibility testing	5 September; 07:40	Successful
30 August; 06:32	Crewed orbital flight with five astronauts					
=== October ===
19 October; 00:45	(France) Ariane 1		(France) Kourou ELA		(France) CNES	
19 October; 00:45	(United Nations) Intelsat 507	Intelsat	Geosynchronous	Communications	In orbit	Successful
20 October; 09:59	(Soviet Union) Soyuz-U		(Soviet Union) Baikonur		(Soviet Union)	
20 October; 09:59	(Soviet Union) Progress 18		Low Earth (Salyut 7)	Logistics	16 November; 04:18	Successful
=== November ===
18 November; 06:32	(United States) Atlas E/Star-37S-ISS		(United States) Vandenberg SLC-3W		(United States)	
18 November; 06:32	(United States) DMSP 5D-2 F7	US Air Force	Sun-synchronous	Meteorology	In orbit	Successful
28 November; 16:00	(United States) Space Shuttle Columbia		(United States) Kennedy LC-39A		(United States) United Space Alliance	
28 November; 16:00	(United States) STS-9	NASA	Low Earth	Microgravity research	8 December; 23:47	Successful
28 November; 16:00	(United States) Spacelab Long Module 1	NASA/ESRO	Low Earth (Columbia)	Microgravity research	8 December; 23:47	Successful
28 November; 16:00	Crewed orbital flight with six astronauts; Maiden flight of Spacelab Long Module					

- ← Jan
- Feb
- Mar
- Apr
- May
- Jun
- Jul
- Aug
- Sep
- Oct
- Nov
- Dec →

== Suborbital launches ==
Date and time (UTC)	Rocket	Flight number	Launch site		LSP	
Date and time (UTC)	Payload	Operator	Orbit	Function	Decay (UTC)	Outcome
Date and time (UTC)	Remarks					
=== January-March ===
7 February; 08:44	(United States) Minuteman 1B		(United States) Vandenberg AFB, LF-06		(United States) US Air Force	
7 February; 08:44	(United States) Reentry vehicle	USAF	Suborbital	ABM target	7 February	Successful
7 February; 08:44	Target for HOE 1, was not intercepted.					
7 February; 09:10	(United States) HOE	HOE 1	(United States) Meck Island, Kwajalein Missile Range		(United States) US Air Force	
7 February; 09:10	(United States) HOE 1	USAF	Suborbital	ABM test	7 February	Spacecraft failure
7 February; 09:10	Failed to intercept the target.					
=== April-June ===
28 May	(United States) Minuteman 1B		(United States) Vandenberg AFB, LF-03		(United States) US Air Force	
28 May	(United States) Reentry vehicle	USAF	Suborbital	ABM target	28 May	Successful
28 May	Target for HOE 2, was not intercepted.					
28 May	(United States) HOE	HOE 2	(United States) Meck Island, Kwajalein Missile Range		(United States) US Air Force	
28 May	(United States) HOE 2	USAF	Suborbital	ABM test	28 May	Spacecraft failure
28 May	Failed to intercept the target.					
=== October-December ===
15 December	(United States) Minuteman 1B		(United States) Vandenberg AFB, LF-03		(United States) US Air Force	
15 December	(United States) Reentry vehicle	USAF	Suborbital	ABM target	15 December	Successful
15 December	Target for HOE, was not intercepted.					
15 December	(United States) HOE	HOE 3	(United States) Meck Island, Kwajalein Missile Range		(United States) US Air Force	
15 December	(United States) HOE 3	USAF	Suborbital	ABM test	15 December	Spacecraft failure
15 December	Failed to intercept the target.					

== Deep-space rendezvous ==
Date (GMT)	Spacecraft	Event	Remarks
10 October	Venera 15	Entered Cytherean orbit	Radar mapper mission
14 October	Venera 16	Entered Cytherean orbit	Radar mapper mission
21 October	ISEE-3/ICE	4th flyby of the Moon	Closest approach: 17,440 kilometres (10,840 mi)
22 December	ISEE-3/ICE	5th flyby of the Moon	Closest approach: 120 kilometres (75 mi)

== EVAs ==
Start date/time	Duration	End time	Spacecraft	Crew	Remarks
7 April; 21:05	4 hours 10 minutes	8 April; 01:15	STS-6 ( Challenger)	(United States) Story Musgrave (United States) Donald H. Peterson	Test spacesuits and tools for future space construction. First spacewalk from a Space Shuttle.
1 November; 04:47	2 hours 50 minutes	07:36	Salyut 7 EO-2	(Soviet Union) Vladimir Lyakhov (Soviet Union) Aleksandr Aleksandrov	Installed a new solar panel to increase the station's electrical output.
3 November; 03:47	2 hours 55 minutes	06:42	Salyut 7 EO-2	(Soviet Union) Vladimir Lyakhov (Soviet Union) Aleksandr Aleksandrov	Installed a second new solar panel, increasing electrical output by 50%.
