= Progress 19 =

Soviet unmanned Progress cargo spacecraft

- A Progress 7K-TG spacecraft
- Mission type: Salyut 7 resupply
- COSPAR ID: 1984-018A
- SATCAT no.: 14757

Spacecraft properties
- Spacecraft: Progress (No.120)
- Spacecraft type: Progress 7K-TG
- Manufacturer: NPO Energia

Start of mission
- Launch date: 21 February 1984; 42 years ago, 06:46:05 UTC
- Rocket: Soyuz-U
- Launch site: Baikonur, Site 31/6

End of mission
- Disposal: Deorbited
- Decay date: 1 April 1984; 42 years ago, 18:18 UTC

Orbital parameters
- Reference system: Geocentric
- Regime: Low Earth
- Perigee altitude: 186 km
- Apogee altitude: 245 km
- Inclination: 51.6°
- Period: 88.8 minutes
- Epoch: 21 February 1984

Docking with Salyut 7
- Docking port: Aft
- Docking date: 23 February 1984, 08:21 UTC
- Undocking date: 31 March 1984, 09:40 UTC

Progress 19 (Russian: Прогресс 19) was a Soviet uncrewed Progress cargo spacecraft, which was launched in February 1984 to resupply the Salyut 7 space station.

== Spacecraft ==
Progress 19 was a Progress 7K-TG spacecraft. I was the 19th of forty-three to be launched; it had the serial number 120. The Progress 7K-TG spacecraft was the first generation Progress, derived from the Soyuz 7K-T and intended for uncrewed logistics missions to space stations in support of the Salyut programme. On some missions the spacecraft were also used to adjust the orbit of the space station.

The Progress spacecraft had a dry mass of 6,520 kilograms (14,370 lb), which increased to around 7,020 kilograms (15,480 lb) when fully fuelled. It measured 7.48 metres (24.5 ft) in length, and 2.72 metres (8 ft 11 in) in diameter. Each spacecraft could accommodate up to 2,500 kilograms (5,500 lb) of payload, consisting of dry cargo and propellant. The spacecraft were powered by chemical batteries, and could operate in free flight for up to three days and remain docked to the station for up to thirty.

== Launch ==
Progress 19 launched on 21 February 1984 from the Baikonur Cosmodrome in the Kazakh SSR. It used a Soyuz-U rocket.

== Docking ==
Progress 19 docked with the aft port of Salyut 7 on 23 February 1984 at 08:21 UTC, and was undocked on 31 March 1984 at 09:40 UTC.

== Decay ==
It remained in orbit until 1 April 1984, when it was deorbited. The deorbit burn occurred at 18:18 UTC, with the mission ending at around 19:05 UTC.

== See also ==
- 1984 in spaceflight
- List of Progress missions
- List of uncrewed spaceflights to Salyut space stations
