= 1984 in spaceflight =

Orbital launches
- First: 5 Jan
- Last: 22 Dec
- Total: 129
- Successes: 128
- Failures: 1

National firsts
- Space traveller: Canada; India

Rockets
- Maiden flights: Ariane 3 Atlas G Long March 3 Space Shuttle Discovery
- Retirements: M-3S; Titan 24B

Crewed flights
- Orbital: 8
- Total travellers: 37

1984 in spaceflight

The following is an outline of 1984 in spaceflight.

== Launches ==
- ← Jan
- Feb
- Mar
- Apr
- May
- Jun
- Jul
- Aug
- Sep
- Oct
- Nov
- Dec →

| Date and time (UTC) | Rocket | Flight number | Launch site | | LSP | |
| Date and time (UTC) | Payload | Operator | Orbit | Function | Decay (UTC) | Outcome |
| Date and time (UTC) | Remarks | | | | | |
|---|---|---|---|---|---|---|
=== January ===
| 23 January; 07:58 | (Japan) (United States) N-II/Star-37E | N-12 | (Japan) Tanegashima Space Center, LP-N | | (Japan) Mitsubishi Heavy Industries (MHI) | |
| 23 January; 07:58 | (Japan) Yuri 2a (BS-2a) | NHK | Geostationary | Communications | In orbit | Successful |
| 29 January; 12:25 | (China) Long March 3 | Y1 | (China) Xichang Satellite Launch Center, LC-3 | | (China) MASI | |
| 29 January; 12:25 | (China) DFH-2 1 (STTW T1) | | Intended: Geostationary (GEO); Achieved: elliptical orbit | Communications, technology test | In orbit | Partial failure |
| 29 January; 12:25 | Third stage failed after restart, payload left in elliptical orbit much lower than planned geostationary transfer orbit. Many planned tests were still carried out. | | | | | |
| 31 January; 03:08 | (United States) Titan 34D/Transtage | | (United States) Cape Canaveral LC-40 | | (United States) | |
| 31 January; 03:08 | (United States) OPS-0441 (Vortex 4) | NRO | High Earth | SIGINT | In orbit | Successful |
=== February ===
| 3 February; 13:00 | (United States) Space Shuttle Challenger | | (United States) Kennedy LC-39A | | (United States) United Space Alliance | |
| 3 February; 13:00 | (United States) STS-41-B | NASA | Low Earth | Satellite deployment | 11 February; 12:15 | Successful |
| 3 February; 13:00 | (United States) Westar 6 | Western Union | Intended: Geosynchronous; Actual: Low Earth | Communications | 16 November; 11:59 | Deployment failure |
| 3 February; 13:00 | (Indonesia) Palapa B2 | Telkom Indonesia | Intended: Geosynchronous; Actual: Low Earth | Communications | 16 November; 11:59 | Deployment failure |
| 3 February; 13:00 | (West Germany) SPAS-1A | NASA | Low Earth (Challenger) | Microgravity research | 11 February; 12:15 | Successful |
| 3 February; 13:00 | Crewed orbital flight with five astronauts; first use of the Manned Maneuvering Unit and the first Space Shuttle landing at the Kennedy Space Center. PAM failures led to Westar 6 and Palapa B2 being stranded in Low Earth orbit. The satellites were subsequently retrieved by Space Shuttle Discovery during mission STS-51-A in November and were returned to Earth for refurbishment. Westar 6 was sold to AsiaSat and renamed AsiaSat 1, and launched by a Chinese Long March 3 carrier rocket on 7 April 1990. Palapa B2 was renamed Palapa B2R and was launched by an American Delta II 6925-8 carrier rocket on 13 April 1990. | | | | | |
| 5 February; 18:44 | (United States) Atlas H | | (United States) Vandenberg SLC-3E | | (United States) | |
| 5 February; 18:44 | (United States) OPS-8737 (NOSS 7) | US Navy | Low Earth | SIGINT | In orbit | Successful |
| 8 February; 12:07 | (Soviet Union) Soyuz-U | | (Soviet Union) Baikonur Site 31/6 | | (Soviet Union) | |
| 8 February; 12:07 | (Soviet Union) Soyuz T-10 | | Low Earth (Salyut 7) | Salyut 7 EO-3 | 11 April; 10:48 | Successful |
| 8 February; 12:07 | Crewed orbital flight with three cosmonauts | | | | | |
| 14 February; 08:00 | (Japan) M-3S | 4 | (Japan) Kagoshima Space Center, LP-M | | (Japan) ISAS | |
| 14 February; 08:00 | (Japan) EXOS C (Ohzora) | ISAS | Low Earth | Upper atmosphere and ionosphere research | 26 December 1988 | Successful |
| 14 February; 08:00 | Final flight of M-3S | | | | | |
| 21 February; 06:46 | (Soviet Union) Soyuz-U | | (Soviet Union) Baikonur Site 31/6 | | (Soviet Union) | |
| 21 February; 06:46 | (Soviet Union) Progress 19 | | Low Earth (Salyut 7) | Logistics | 1 April; 18:18 | Successful |
=== March ===
| 5 March; 00:50 | (France) Ariane 1 | | (France) Kourou ELA | | (France) CNES | |
| 5 March; 00:50 | (United Nations) Intelsat 508 | Intelsat | Geosynchronous | Communications | In orbit | Successful |
=== April ===
| 3 April; 13:08 | (Soviet Union) Soyuz-U | | (Soviet Union) Baikonur Site 31/6 | | (Soviet Union) | |
| 3 April; 13:08 | (Soviet Union) Soyuz T-11 | | Low Earth (Salyut 7) | Salyut 7 EP-3 | 2 October; 10:57 | Successful |
| 3 April; 13:08 | Crewed orbital flight with three cosmonauts including the first Indian space traveller | | | | | |
| 6 April; 13:58 | (United States) Space Shuttle Challenger | | (United States) Kennedy LC-39A | | (United States) United Space Alliance | |
| 6 April; 13:58 | (United States) STS-41-C | NASA | Low Earth | Satellite deployment and repair | 13 April; 13:38 | Successful |
| 6 April; 13:58 | (United States) LDEF | NASA | Low Earth | Material science | 20 January 1990; 06:35 | Successful |
| 6 April; 13:58 | Crewed orbital flight with five astronauts; Solar Max repair mission LDEF retrieved by Space Shuttle Columbia during mission STS-32 in January 1990. | | | | | |
| 8 April; 11:20 | (China) Long March 3 | Y2 | (China) Xichang SLC, LC-3 | | (China) MASI | |
| 8 April; 11:20 | (China) DFH-2 2 (STTW T2) | | Geostationary | Communications, technology test | In orbit | Successful |
| 8 April; 11:20 | First successful Chinese communications satellite on the geostationary orbit | | | | | |
| 14 April; 16:52 | (United States) Titan 34D/Transtage | | (United States) Cape Canaveral LC-40 | | (United States) | |
| 14 April; 16:52 | (United States) OPS-7641 (DSP-12) | US Air Force | Geosynchronous | Early warning | In orbit | Successful |
| 15 April; 08:12 | (Soviet Union) Soyuz-U | | (Soviet Union) Baikonur Site 31/6 | | (Soviet Union) | |
| 15 April; 08:12 | (Soviet Union) Progress 20 | | Low Earth (Salyut 7) | Logistics | 7 May; 00:32 | Successful |
| 17 April; 18:45 | (United States) Titan 24B | | (United States) Vandenberg SLC-4W | | (United States) | |
| 17 April; 18:45 | (United States) OPS-8424 (KH-8-54) | NRO | Sun-synchronous | Reconnaissance | 13 August | Successful |
| 17 April; 18:45 | Final flight of Titan 24B and the final KH-8 spacecraft | | | | | |
=== May ===
| 7 May; 22:47 | (Soviet Union) Soyuz-U | | (Soviet Union) Baikonur Site 31/6 | | (Soviet Union) | |
| 7 May; 22:47 | (Soviet Union) Progress 21 | | Low Earth (Salyut 7) | Logistics | 26 May; 15:00 | Successful |
| 23 May; 01:33 | (France) Ariane 1 | | (France) Kourou ELA | | (France) Arianespace | |
| 23 May; 01:33 | (United States) Spacenet F1 | Spacenet | Geosynchronous | Communications | In orbit | Successful |
| 28 May; 14:12 | (Soviet Union) Soyuz-U | | (Soviet Union) Baikonur Site 31/6 | | (Soviet Union) | |
| 28 May; 14:12 | (Soviet Union) Progress 22 | | Low Earth (Salyut 7) | Logistics | 15 July; 18:52 | Successful |
=== June ===
| 9 June; 23:03 | (United States) Atlas G | | (United States) Cape Canaveral LC-36B | | (United States) | |
| 9 June; 23:03 | (United Nations) Intelsat 509 | Intelsat | Intended: Geosynchronous; Achieved: Low Earth | Communications | 24 October | Launch Failure |
| 9 June; 23:03 | Maiden flight of Atlas G Upper stage malfunction left payload in a useless orbit | | | | | |
| 13 June; 11:37 | (United States) Atlas E/SGS-2 | | (United States) Vandenberg SLC-3W | | (United States) | |
| 13 June; 11:37 | (United States) USA-1 (GPS-9) | US Air Force | Medium Earth | Navigation | In orbit | Successful |
| 25 June; 18:47 | (United States) Titan 34D | | (United States) Vandenberg SLC-4E | | (United States) | |
| 25 June; 18:47 | (United States) USA-2 (KH-9-19) | NRO | Sun-synchronous | Reconnaissance | 18 October | Successful |
| 25 June; 18:47 | (United States) USA-3 (SSF-D-5) | NRO | Sun-synchronous | ELINT | In orbit | Successful |
=== July ===
| 17 July; 17:40 | (Soviet Union) Soyuz-U2 | | (Soviet Union) Baikonur Site 31/6 | | (Soviet Union) | |
| 17 July; 17:40 | (Soviet Union) Soyuz T-12 | | Low Earth (Salyut 7) | Salyut 7 EP-4 | 29 July; 12:55 | Successful |
| 17 July; 17:40 | Crewed orbital flight with three cosmonauts First crewed flight of Soyuz-U2 | | | | | |
| 26 July; 18:05 | (Brazil) Sonda III | | (Brazil) Barreira do Inferno Launch Center | | (Brazil) IAE | |
| 26 July; 18:05 | (Brazil) | IAE | Suborbital | Engineering test | 26 July | Successful |
| 26 July; 18:05 | 688 km downrange. 565 km apogee. 12 min 40 s flight duration. 17th Sonda III launch. | | | | | |
=== August ===
| 2 August; 20:30 | (Japan) (United States) N-II/Star 37E | N-13 | (Japan) Tanegashima Space Center, LP-N | | (Japan) MHI | |
| 2 August; 20:30 | (Japan) Himawari 3 (GMS-3) | JMA | Geostationary | Meteorology | In orbit | Successful |
| 4 August; 13:32 | (France) Ariane 3 | | (France) Kourou ELA | | (France) Arianespace | |
| 4 August; 13:32 | (France) Eutelsat 1F2 | Eutelsat | Geosynchronous | Communications | In orbit | Successful |
| 4 August; 13:32 | (France) Telecom 1A | France Télécom | Geosynchronous | Communications | In orbit | Successful |
| 4 August; 13:32 | Maiden flight of Ariane 3 Eutelsat 1F2 retired in 1993 | | | | | |
| 14 August; 06:28 | (Soviet Union) Soyuz-U | | (Soviet Union) Baikonur Site 1/5 | | (Soviet Union) | |
| 14 August; 06:28 | (Soviet Union) Progress 23 | | Low Earth (Salyut 7) | Logistics | 28 August; 01:28 | Successful |
| 28 August; 18:03 | (United States) Titan 34B | | (United States) Vandenberg SLC-4W | | (United States) | |
| 28 August; 18:03 | (United States) USA-4 (SDS-1-5) | US Air Force | Molniya | Communications | In orbit | Successful |
| 30 August; 12:41 | (United States) Space Shuttle Discovery | | (United States) Kennedy LC-39A | | (United States) United Space Alliance | |
| 30 August; 12:41 | (United States) STS-41-D | NASA | Low Earth | Satellite deployment | 5 September; 15:37 | Successful |
| 30 August; 12:41 | (United States) SBS-4 | SBS | Current: Graveyard; Operational: Geosynchronous | Communications | In orbit | Successful |
| 30 August; 12:41 | (United States) Telstar 302 | AT&T | Current: Graveyard; Operational: Geosynchronous | Communications | In orbit | Successful |
| 30 August; 12:41 | (United States) Leasat 2 | US Navy | Current: Graveyard; Operational: Geosynchronous | Communications | In orbit | Successful |
| 30 August; 12:41 | (United States) OAST-1 | NASA | Low Earth (Discovery) | Solar array R&D | 5 September; 15:37 | Successful |
| 30 August; 12:41 | Crewed orbital flight with six astronauts Maiden flight of Space Shuttle Discovery | | | | | |
=== September ===
| 8 September; 21:41 | (United States) Atlas E/SGS-2 | | (United States) Vandenberg SLC-3W | | (United States) | |
| 8 September; 21:41 | (United States) USA-5 (GPS-10) | US Air Force | Medium Earth | Navigation | In orbit | Successful |
| 12 September; 05:44 | (China) Long March 2C | Y3 | (China) Jiuquan Satellite Launch Center, LA-2B (Site 138) | | (China) MASI | |
| 12 September; 05:44 | (China) FSW-0 6 | | Low Earth | Reconnaissance | 29 September | Successful |
=== October ===
| 5 October; 11:03 | (United States) Space Shuttle Challenger | | (United States) Kennedy LC-39A | | (United States) United Space Alliance | |
| 5 October; 11:03 | (United States) STS-41-G | NASA | Low Earth | Satellite deployment | 13 October; 16:26 | Successful |
| 5 October; 11:03 | (United States) ERBS | NASA | Low Earth | Radiation budget observation | 9 January 2023; 04:04 | Successful |
| 5 October; 11:03 | (United States) OSTA-3 | NASA | Low Earth (Challenger) | Earth imaging | 13 October; 16:26 | Successful |
| 5 October; 11:03 | (United States) ORS | NASA | Low Earth (Challenger) | Satellite refuelling demonstration | 13 October; 16:26 | Successful |
| 5 October; 11:03 | Crewed orbital flight with seven astronauts including the first Canadian space traveller Shuttle Imaging Radar-B (SIR-B); ERBS retired on 14 October 2005 | | | | | |
=== November ===
| 8 November; 12:15 | (United States) Space Shuttle Discovery | | (United States) Kennedy LC-39A | | (United States) United Space Alliance | |
| 8 November; 12:15 | (United States) STS-51-A | NASA | Low Earth | Satellite deployment and retrieval | 16 November; 11:59 | Successful |
| 8 November; 12:15 | (Canada) Anik D2 | Telesat Canada | Current: Graveyard; Operational: Geosynchronous | Communications | In orbit | Successful |
| 8 November; 12:15 | (United States) Leasat 1 | US Navy | Current: Graveyard; Operational: Geosynchronous | Communications | In orbit | Successful |
| 8 November; 12:15 | Crewed orbital flight with five astronauts Anik D2 retired on 31 January 1995; Retrieved Westar 6 and Palapa B2 satellites which were stranded in Low Earth orbit after PAM failures during deployment from Space Shuttle Challenger on mission STS-41-B in February. | | | | | |
| 10 November; 01:14 | (France) Ariane 3 | | (France) Kourou ELA | | (France) Arianespace | |
| 10 November; 01:14 | (United States) Spacenet F2 | Spacenet | Geosynchronous | Communications | In orbit | Successful |
| 10 November; 01:14 | MARECS 2 | ESA | Geosynchronous | Communications | In orbit | Successful |
| 21 November | (Brazil) Sonda IV | | (Brazil) Barreira do Inferno Launch Center | | (Brazil) CTA | |
| 21 November | (Brazil) | CTA | Suborbital | Engineering test | 21 November | Successful |
| 21 November | 600 km apogee. 1st Sonda IV launch. | | | | | |
=== December ===
| 4 December; 18:03 | (United States) Titan 34D | | (United States) Vandenberg SLC-4E | | (United States) | |
| 4 December; 18:03 | (United States) USA-6 (KH-11-6) | NRO | Sun-synchronous | Reconnaissance | In orbit | Successful |
| 12 December; 10:42 | (United States) Atlas E/Star-37S-ISS | | (United States) Vandenberg SLC-3W | | (United States) | |
| 12 December; 10:42 | (United States) NOAA 9 (NOAA-F) | NOAA | Sun-synchronous | Meteorology | In orbit | Successful |
| 22 December; 00:02 | (United States) Titan 34D/Transtage | | (United States) Cape Canaveral LC-40 | | (United States) | |
| 22 December; 00:02 | (United States) USA-7 (DSP-12) | US Air Force | Geosynchronous | Early warning | In orbit | Successful |

- ← Jan
- Feb
- Mar
- Apr
- May
- Jun
- Jul
- Aug
- Sep
- Oct
- Nov
- Dec →

== Suborbital launches ==
| Date and time (UTC) | Rocket | Flight number | Launch site | | LSP | |
| Date and time (UTC) | Payload | Operator | Orbit | Function | Decay (UTC) | Outcome |
| Date and time (UTC) | Remarks | | | | | |
|---|---|---|---|---|---|---|
=== April-June ===
| 9 April | (North Korea) Hwasong-5 | | (North Korea) Tonghae | | (North Korea) Korean People's Army Strategic Force | |
| 9 April | (North Korea) | Korean People's Army Strategic Force | Suborbital | Missile test | 9 April | Successful? |
| 9 April | Apogee: 200 kilometres (120 mi). | | | | | |
| 10 June | (United States) Minuteman 1B | | (United States) Vandenberg AFB, LF-06 | | (United States) US Air Force | |
| 10 June | (United States) Reentry vehicle | USAF | Suborbital | ABM target | 10 June | Intercepted |
| 10 June | Target for HOE 4, modified for increased visibility, successfully intercepted. | | | | | |
| 10 June | (United States) HOE | HOE 4 | (United States) Meck Island, Kwajalein Missile Range | | (United States) US Air Force | |
| 10 June | (United States) HOE 4 | USAF | Suborbital | ABM test | 10 June | Successful |
| 10 June | Successfully intercepted the target. | | | | | |
=== July-September ===
| September (exact date unknown) | (North Korea) Hwasong-5 | | (North Korea) Tonghae | | (North Korea) Korean People's Army Strategic Force | |
| September (exact date unknown) | (North Korea) | Korean People's Army Strategic Force | Suborbital | Missile test | September (exact date unknown) | Failure? |
| September (exact date unknown) | Apogee: 200 kilometres (120 mi). | | | | | |
| September (exact date unknown) | (North Korea) Hwasong-5 | | (North Korea) Tonghae | | (North Korea) Korean People's Army Strategic Force | |
| September (exact date unknown) | (North Korea) | Korean People's Army Strategic Force | Suborbital | Missile test | September (exact date unknown) | Failure? |
| September (exact date unknown) | Apogee: 200 kilometres (120 mi). | | | | | |
== Deep-space rendezvous ==
There were no deep-space rendezvous in 1984.

== EVAs ==
| Start date/time | Duration | End time | Spacecraft | Crew | Remarks |
|---|---|---|---|---|---|
| 7 February | 5 hours 55 minutes | | STS-41-B; Challenger | (United States) Bruce McCandless II (United States) Robert L. Stewart | McCandless and Stewart rode on the Crewed Maneuvering Unit (MMUs) during the first untethered EVAs in history. Both astronauts practiced using tools and procedures for the planned capture and repair of the Solar Maximum Mission (SMM) satellite to be performed in a subsequent flight. |
| 9 February | 6 hours 17 minutes | | STS-41-B; Challenger | (United States) Bruce McCandless II (United States) Robert L. Stewart | Continued testing the MMUs and practice with tools and procedures to be used with recovery and repair of the SMM satellite. |
| 8 April; 14:18 | 2 hours 38 minutes | 16:56 | STS-41-C; Challenger | (United States) George Nelson (United States) James van Hoften | Nelson rode the MMU to the SMM satellite. Van Hoften stood by in the payload bay to provide any needed assistance. After three unsuccessful attempts to capture the SMM with the Trunnion Pin Acquisition Device (TPAD) tool and one attempt to grab the satellite by hand, the spacewalkers returned to Challenger. The SMM was recovered the next day with the RMS. |
| 11 April; 08:58 | 6 hours 44 minutes | 15:42 | STS-41-C; Challenger | (United States) George Nelson (United States) James van Hoften | Completed repair of the SMM satellite and then continued testing of the MMU. |
| 23 April; 04:31 | 4 hours 20 minutes | 08:46 | Salyut 7 EO-3 | (Soviet Union) Leonid Kizim (Soviet Union) Vladimir Solovyov | Installed a new ladder to reach the ruptured Main Oxidizer Line on Salyut 7. First of five EVAs to conduct the repair. |
| 26 April; 02:40 | 4 hours 56 minutes | 07:40 | Salyut 7 EO-3 | (Soviet Union) Leonid Kizim (Soviet Union) Vladimir Solovyov | Removed installation and installed a valve in the spare oxidizer line. Second of five EVAs to repair the Main Oxidizer Line on the station. |
| 29 April; 01:35 | 2 hours 45 minutes | 04:20 | Salyut 7 EO-3 | (Soviet Union) Leonid Kizim (Soviet Union) Vladimir Solovyov | Installed a bypass line around the damaged section of the Main Oxidizer Line on the station. Third of five repair EVAs. |
| 3 May; 23:15 | 2 hours 45 minutes | 4 May; 02:00 | Salyut 7 EO-3 | (Soviet Union) Leonid Kizim (Soviet Union) Vladimir Solovyov | Installed a second bypass line and replaced thermal insulation at the Main Oxidizer Line of the station. Fourth of five repair EVAs. |
| 18 May; 17:52 | 3 hours 5 minutes | 20:57 | Salyut 7 EO-3 | (Soviet Union) Leonid Kizim (Soviet Union) Vladimir Solovyov | Installed two new solar arrays onto the space station. |
| 25 July; 14:55 | 3 hours 35 minutes | 18:29 | Salyut 7 EP-4 | (Soviet Union) Vladimir Dzhanibekov (Soviet Union) Svetlana Savitskaya | Tested the URI multi-purpose tool with several metal samples. Savitskaya became the first women in history to perform an EVA. |
| 8 August; 08:46 | 5 hours | 13:46 | Salyut 7 EO-3 | (Soviet Union) Leonid Kizim (Soviet Union) Vladimir Solovyov | Using a pneumatic press tool delivered by Soyuz T-12, the cosmonauts completed the fifth and final EVA to repair the damaged Main Oxidizer Line of the station by crimping the ends of the ruptured pipe. |
| 11 October; 15:38 | 3 hours 29 minutes | 19:05 | STS-41-G; Challenger | (United States) David Leestma (United States) Kathryn Sullivan | Demonstrated the use of the Orbital Refueling System, including the installation of an ORS valve maintenance kit. Sullivan was the first American women and the second women in history to conduct an EVA. |
| 12 November; 13:25 | 6 hours | 19:25 | STS-51-A; Discovery | (United States) Joseph P. Allen (United States) Dale Gardner | Allen rode the MMU to the Palapa B2 satellite and retrieved it into the payload bay. Gardner and Allen then secured the satellite in the payload bay for return to Earth. |
| 14 November; 11:09 | 5 hours 42 minutes | 16:51 | STS-51-A; Discovery | (United States) Joseph P. Allen (United States) Dale Gardner | Gardner rode the MMU to the Westar 6 satellite and retrieved it into the payload bay. Allen and Gardner then secured the satellite in the payload bay for return to Earth. |
