= Progress 23 =

Soviet unmanned Progress cargo spacecraft

- Mission type: Salyut 7 resupply
- COSPAR ID: 1984-086A
- SATCAT no.: 15193
- Mission duration: 13 days and 19 hours

Spacecraft properties
- Spacecraft: Progress (No.124)
- Spacecraft type: Progress 7K-TG
- Manufacturer: NPO Energia

Start of mission
- Launch date: 14 August 1984, 06:28:15 UTC
- Rocket: Soyuz-U
- Launch site: Baikonur 1/5

End of mission
- Disposal: Deorbited
- Decay date: 28 August 1984, 01:28 UTC

Orbital parameters
- Reference system: Geocentric
- Regime: Low Earth
- Perigee altitude: 186 km
- Apogee altitude: 250 km
- Inclination: 51.6°
- Period: 88.9 minutes
- Epoch: 14 August 1984

Docking with Salyut 7
- Docking port: Aft
- Docking date: 16 August 1984, 08:11 UTC
- Undocking date: 26 August 1984, 16:13 UTC
- Time docked: 10 days, 8 hours and 2 minutes

Progress 23 (Russian: Прогресс 23) was a Soviet uncrewed Progress cargo spacecraft, which was launched in August 1984 to resupply the Salyut 7 space station.

== Launch ==
Progress 23 launched on 14 August 1984 from the Baikonur Cosmodrome in the Kazakh SSR. It used a Soyuz-U rocket.

== Docking ==
Progress 23 docked with the aft port of Salyut 7 on 16 August 1984 at 08:11 UTC, and was undocked on 26 August 1984 at 16:13 UTC.

== Decay ==
It remained in orbit until 28 August 1984, when it was deorbited. The deorbit burn occurred at 01:28 UTC, with the mission ending at around 02:15 UTC.

== See also ==
- 1984 in spaceflight
- List of Progress missions
- List of uncrewed spaceflights to Salyut space stations
