= 1986 in spaceflight =

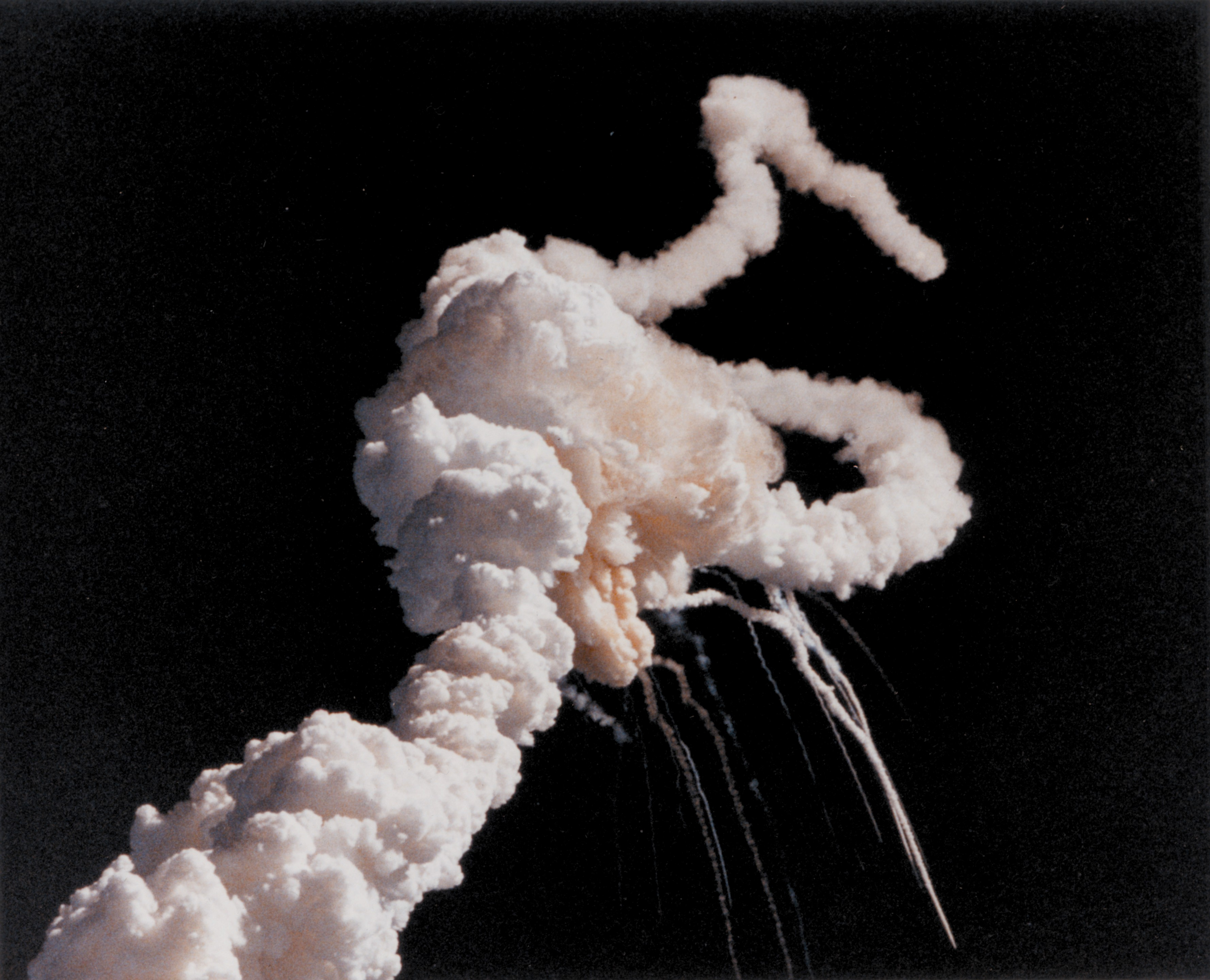
- Space Shuttle Challenger disintegrates during the launch of STS-51-L, killing all seven astronauts

National firsts
- Satellite: Sweden

Rockets
- Maiden flights: Ariane 2
- Retirements: Ariane 1 Space Shuttle Challenger

Crewed flights
- Orbital: 2
- Total travellers: 9

1986 in spaceflight

The year 1986 saw the destruction of Space Shuttle Challenger shortly after lift-off, killing all seven aboard, the first in-flight deaths of American astronauts. This accident followed the successful flight of Columbia just weeks earlier, and dealt a major setback to the U.S. crewed space program, suspending the Shuttle program for 32 months.

The year also saw numerous fly-bys of Halley's Comet as well as other successes.

== Launches ==
- ← Jan
- Feb
- Mar
- Apr
- May
- Jun
- Jul
- Aug
- Sep
- Oct
- Nov
- Dec →

Date and time (UTC)	Rocket	Flight number	Launch site		LSP	
Date and time (UTC)	Payload (⚀ = CubeSat)	Operator	Orbit	Function	Decay (UTC)	Outcome
Date and time (UTC)	Remarks					
=== January ===
12 January; 11:55	(United States) Space Shuttle Columbia		(United States) Kennedy LC-39A		(United States) United Space Alliance	
12 January; 11:55	(United States) STS-61-C	NASA	Low Earth	Satellite deployment	18 January; 13:58	Successful
12 January; 11:55	(United States) Satcom K1	RCA Americom	Geosynchronous	Communications	In orbit	Successful
12 January; 11:55	(United States) MSL-2	NASA	Low Earth (Columbia)	Microgravity experiments	18 January; 13:58	Successful
12 January; 11:55	(United States) Getaway Special Bridge	NASA	Low Earth (Columbia)	Getaway Special carrier	18 January; 13:58	Successful
12 January; 11:55	Crewed orbital flight with seven astronauts; Maiden flight of the Getaway Special Bridge					
28 January; 16:38	(United States) Space Shuttle Challenger		(United States) Kennedy LC-39B		(United States) United Space Alliance	
28 January; 16:38	(United States) STS-51-L	NASA	Intended: Low Earth	Satellite deployment	+ 73 seconds	Launch failure
28 January; 16:38	(United States) TDRS-B	NASA	Intended: Geosynchronous	Communications	+ 73 seconds	Launch failure
28 January; 16:38	(United States) SPARTAN 203	NASA	Intended: Low Earth	Examine Halley's Comet	+ 73 seconds	Launch failure
28 January; 16:38	Space Shuttle Challenger disaster; Vehicle disintegrated at + 73 seconds from an O-ring failure in the right SRB. All seven astronauts were killed, including Christa McAuliffe, the intended first Teacher in Space. First Shuttle launch from LC-39B.					
=== February ===
9 February; 10:06	(United States) Atlas H		(United States) Vandenberg SLC-3E		(United States)	
9 February; 10:06	(United States) USA-15 (NOSS-8)	US Navy	Low Earth	SIGINT	In orbit	Successful
9 February; 10:06	(United States) USA-16 (NOSS)	US Navy	Low Earth	SIGINT	In orbit	Successful
9 February; 10:06	(United States) USA-17 (NOSS)	US Navy	Low Earth	SIGINT	In orbit	Successful
9 February; 10:06	(United States) USA-18 (NOSS)	US Navy	Low Earth	SIGINT	In orbit	Successful
19 February; 21:28	(Soviet Union) Proton-K		(Soviet Union) Baikonur Site 200/39		(Soviet Union)	
19 February; 21:28	(Soviet Union) DOS-7 (Mir Core)		Low Earth (Mir)	Space station	23 March 2001; 05:07	Successful
19 February; 21:28	Core module of the Mir space station					
22 February; 01:44	(France) Ariane 1		(France) Kourou ELA		(France) Arianespace	
22 February; 01:44	(France) SPOT 1	CNES	Sun-synchronous	Earth observation	In orbit	Successful
22 February; 01:44	(Sweden) Viking	SSC	Sun-synchronous	Plasma research	In orbit	Successful
22 February; 01:44	Final flight of Ariane 1 SPOT 1 retired on 31 December 1990 and orbit was lowered to a disposal orbit in 2003; Viking is the first Swedish satellite, and operations concluded on 12 May 1987					
=== March ===
13 March; 12:33	(Soviet Union) Soyuz-U2		(Soviet Union) Baikonur Site 1/5		(Soviet Union)	
13 March; 12:33	(Soviet Union) Soyuz T-15		Low Earth (Salyut 7 and Mir)	Salyut 7 EO-5; Mir EO-1	16 July; 12:34	Successful
13 March; 12:33	Crewed orbital flight with two cosmonauts; Final crewed spaceflight to Salyut 7 and the first to Mir. Final flight of the Soyuz-T spacecraft. Only spacecraft to dock with two space stations during one flight.					
19 March; 10:08	(Soviet Union) Soyuz-U2		(Soviet Union) Baikonur Site 1/5		(Soviet Union)	
19 March; 10:08	(Soviet Union) Progress 25		Low Earth (Mir)	Logistics	21 April; 00:48	Successful
28 March; 23:30	(France) Ariane 3		(France) Kourou ELA		(France) Arianespace	
28 March; 23:30	(United States) GStar 2	GTE Spacenet	Geosynchronous	Communications	In orbit	Successful
28 March; 23:30	(Brazil) Brasilsat-A2	Embratel	Current: Graveyard; Operational: Geosynchronous	Communications	In orbit	Successful
28 March; 23:30	Brasilsat-A2 was retired on 6 March 2004 and moved 200 kilometres (120 mi) higher to a graveyard orbit					
=== April ===
18 April; 17:45	(United States) Titan 34D		(United States) Vandenberg SLC-4E		(United States)	
18 April; 17:45	(United States) KH-9-20	NRO	Intended: Sun-synchronous	Reconnaissance	+ 8.5 seconds	Launch Failure
18 April; 17:45	(United States) SSF-D-6	NRO	Intended: Sun-synchronous	ELINT	+ 8.5 seconds	Launch Failure
18 April; 17:45	SRM burnthrough, exploded 8.5 seconds after launch Final flight of the KH-9 spacecraft					
23 April; 19:40	(Soviet Union) Soyuz-U2		(Soviet Union) Baikonur Site 1/5		(Soviet Union)	
23 April; 19:40	(Soviet Union) Progress 26		Low Earth (Mir)	Logistics	23 June; 18:41	Successful
=== May ===
3 May; 22:18	(United States) Delta 3914		(United States) Cape Canaveral Air Force Station Launch Complex 17A		(United States) McDonnell Douglas	
3 May; 22:18	(United States) GOES-G	NOAA, NASA	Geostationary	Weather satellite	3 May	Launch Failure
3 May; 22:18	Rocket destroyed 71 sec. after liftoff due to engine shutdown; First launch from CCAFS after Space Shuttle Challenger disaster					
21 May; 08:21	(Soviet Union) Soyuz-U2		(Soviet Union) Baikonur Site 1/5		(Soviet Union)	
21 May; 08:21	(Soviet Union) Soyuz TM-1		Low Earth (Mir)	Test flight	30 May; 04:26	Successful
21 May; 08:21	Maiden flight of Soyuz-TM spacecraft; Uncrewed test flight					
31 May; 00:53	(France) Ariane 2		(France) Kourou ELA		(France) Arianespace	
31 May; 00:53	(United Nations) Intelsat 514	Intelsat	Intended: Geosynchronous	Communications	31 May	Launch Failure
31 May; 00:53	Maiden flight of Ariane 2; Third stage failed to ignite					
=== August ===
28 August; 08:02	(Soviet Union) Molniya-M/2BL		(Soviet Union) Plesetsk Site 16/2		(Soviet Union)	
28 August; 08:02	(Soviet Union) Kosmos 1774 (Oko)		Molniya	Missile defence	2 November 2010; 15:14	Successful
=== September ===
5 September; 15:08	(United States) Delta 3920		(United States) Cape Canaveral LC-17B		(United States) NASA	
5 September; 15:08	(United States) USA-19 (Delta 180)	SDIO	LEO	Sensor development	28 October 1986	Successful
5 September; 15:08	Satellite impactor test for the Strategic Defense Initiative.					
17 September; 15:52	(United States) Atlas E/Star-37S-ISS		(United States) Vandenberg SLC-3W		(United States)	
17 September; 15:52	(United States) NOAA-10 (NOAA-G)	NOAA	Sun-synchronous	Meteorology	In orbit	Successful
=== November ===
14 November; 00:23	(United States) Scout G-1		(United States) Vandenberg SLC-5		(United States) US Air Force	
14 November; 00:23	(United States) Polar BEAR P87-1	US Air Force/STP	Low Earth (Polar)		In orbit	Successful
=== December ===
5 December; 02:30	(United States) Atlas G		(United States) Cape Canaveral LC-36B		(United States)	
5 December; 02:30	(United States) USA-20 (FLTSATCOM 7)	US Navy	Geosynchronous	Communications	In orbit	Successful

- ← Jan
- Feb
- Mar
- Apr
- May
- Jun
- Jul
- Aug
- Sep
- Oct
- Nov
- Dec →

== Deep space rendezvous ==
Date (GMT)	Spacecraft	Event	Remarks
24 January	Voyager 2	Flyby of Uranus	Closest approach: 71,000 kilometres (44,000 mi)
6 March	Vega 1	Flyby of Halley's Comet	Closest approach: 8,890 kilometres (5,520 mi)
8 March	Suisei	Flyby of Halley's Comet	Closest approach: 151,000 kilometres (94,000 mi)
9 March	Vega 2	Flyby of Halley's Comet	Closest approach: 8,030 kilometres (4,990 mi)
11 March	Sakigake	Distant flyby of Halley's Comet	Closest approach: 6,990,000 kilometres (4,340,000 mi)
14 March	Giotto	Flyby of Halley's Comet	Closest approach: 595 kilometres (370 mi)

== EVAs ==
Start date/time	Duration	End time	Spacecraft	Crew	Remarks
28 May; 05:43	3 hours 50 minutes	09:33	Salyut 7 EO-5	(Soviet Union) Leonid Kizim (Soviet Union) Vladimir Solovyov	Retrieved test panels from the outside of Salyut 7 and assembled a test "girder-constructor" apparatus in preparation for work on Mir.
31 May; 04:57	5 hours	09:57	Salyut 7 EO-5	(Soviet Union) Leonid Kizim (Soviet Union) Vladimir Solovyov	Conducted additional tests on the experimental construction equipment, including the welding of several girders joints.

Preceded by 1985	Timeline of spaceflight 1986	Succeeded by 1987
