= Kosmos 1669 =

Only Progress spacecraft with a Kosmos designation

- Mission type: Salyut 7 resupply
- Operator: OKB-1
- COSPAR ID: 1985-062A
- SATCAT no.: 15918
- Mission duration: 41 days, 12 hours and 15 minutes

Spacecraft properties
- Spacecraft: Progress s/n 126
- Spacecraft type: Progress 7K-TG
- Manufacturer: NPO Energia
- Launch mass: 7280 kg
- Dry mass: 7020 kg
- Payload mass: 2500 kg
- Dimensions: 7.48 m in length and 2.72 m in diameter

Start of mission
- Launch date: 19 July 1985, 13:05 UTC
- Rocket: Soyuz-U s/n B15000-446
- Launch site: Baikonur 1/5
- Contractor: OKB-1

End of mission
- Disposal: Deorbited
- Decay date: 30 August 1985, 01:20 UTC

Orbital parameters
- Reference system: Geocentric
- Regime: Low Earth
- Perigee altitude: 298 km
- Apogee altitude: 358 km
- Inclination: 51.66°
- Period: 91.0 minutes
- Epoch: 19 July 1985

Docking with Salyut 7
- Docking port: Aft
- Docking date: 21 July 1985, 15:05 UTC
- Undocking date: 28 August 1985, 21:50 UTC
- Time docked: 38 days, 6 hours and 45 minutes

Cargo
- Mass: 2500 kg

Kosmos 1669 (Russian: Космос-1669) was a Progress spacecraft used to resupply the Salyut 7 space station. It was a Progress 7K-TG spacecraft with the serial number 126.

== Mission ==
Kosmos-1669 was launched by a Soyuz-U carrier rocket from Site 1/5 at the Baikonur Cosmodrome, at 13:05 UTC on 19 July 1985. The spacecraft docked with the aft port of Salyut 7 at 15:05 UTC on 21 July 1985. Following undocking on 28 August 1985, it moved away from the station, before returning and redocking to test the reliability of the docking system. It undocked for a second time at 21:50 UTC, and was deorbited on 30 August 1985, with the spacecraft burning up over the Pacific Ocean at 01:20 UTC.

== Salyut-7 ==
Kosmos-1669 was the second cargo spacecraft (after Progress 24) to visit Salyut 7 after its reactivation, and also the last Progress flight as part of the Salyut programme. It delivered new spacesuit, to replace ones damaged by cold temperatures whilst Salyut 7 was deactivated, as well as replacement parts and consumables. This Progress mission was followed by one last cargo mission to Salyut 7, but carried out by an TKS spacecraft: TKS-4, which would become the fourth and last flight of an TKS spacecraft. The next following mission of a Progress cargo spacecraft, Progress 25, flew to Mir.

As of 2009, Kosmos-1669 is the only Progress spacecraft to have received a Kosmos designation, which are usually reserved for military, experimental and failed spacecraft. It has been reported that this may have been an error due to confusion with a TKS spacecraft which later became Kosmos 1686, or that the spacecraft may have gone out of control shortly after launch, but then been recovered after the Kosmos designation had been applied. Alternatively, it could have been given the designation as it was used to test modifications that would be used on future Progress missions. Some news agencies reported that it was a free-flying Progress-derived spacecraft, or that it was a new type of spacecraft derived from the Progress.

== See also ==
- List of Progress flights
