= Progress 22 =

Soviet unmanned Progress cargo spacecraft

- Mission type: Salyut 7 resupply
- COSPAR ID: 1984-051A
- SATCAT no.: 14996
- Mission duration: 48 days, 4 hours and 39 minutes

Spacecraft properties
- Spacecraft: Progress (No.122)
- Spacecraft type: Progress 7K-TG
- Manufacturer: NPO Energia

Start of mission
- Launch date: 28 May 1984, 14:12:52 UTC
- Rocket: Soyuz-U
- Launch site: Baikonur 31/6

End of mission
- Disposal: Deorbited
- Decay date: 15 July 1984, 18:52:00 UTC

Orbital parameters
- Reference system: Geocentric
- Regime: Low Earth
- Perigee altitude: 188 km
- Apogee altitude: 244 km
- Inclination: 51.6°
- Period: 88.8 minutes
- Epoch: 28 May 1984

Docking with Salyut 7
- Docking port: Aft
- Docking date: 30 May 1984, 15:47 UTC
- Undocking date: 15 July 1984, 13:36 UTC
- Time docked: 45 days, 21 hours and 49 minutes

Progress 22 (Russian: Прогресс 22) was a Soviet uncrewed Progress cargo spacecraft, which was launched in May 1984 to resupply the Salyut 7 space station.

== Launch ==
Progress 22 launched on 28 May 1984 from the Baikonur Cosmodrome in the Kazakh SSR. It used a Soyuz-U rocket.

== Docking ==
Progress 22 docked with the aft port of Salyut 7 on 30 May 1984 at 15:47 UTC, and was undocked on 15 July 1984 at 13:36 UTC.

== Decay ==
It remained in orbit until 15 July 1984, when it was deorbited. The deorbit burn occurred at 18:52:00 UTC, with the mission ending at around 19:35 UTC.

== See also ==
- 1984 in spaceflight
- List of Progress missions
- List of uncrewed spaceflights to Salyut space stations
