= Progress 21 =

Soviet unmanned Progress cargo spacecraft

- A Progress 7K-TG spacecraft
- Mission type: Salyut 7 resupply
- COSPAR ID: 1984-042A
- SATCAT no.: 14961

Spacecraft properties
- Spacecraft: Progress (No.116)
- Spacecraft type: Progress 7K-TG
- Manufacturer: NPO Energia

Start of mission
- Launch date: 7 May 1984, 22:47:15 UTC
- Rocket: Soyuz-U
- Launch site: Baikonur, Site 31/6

End of mission
- Disposal: Deorbited
- Decay date: 26 May 1984, 15:00:30 UTC

Orbital parameters
- Reference system: Geocentric
- Regime: Low Earth
- Perigee altitude: 187 km
- Apogee altitude: 246 km
- Inclination: 51.6°
- Period: 88.8 minutes
- Epoch: 26 May 1984

Docking with Salyut 7
- Docking port: Aft
- Docking date: 10 May 1984, 00:10 UTC
- Undocking date: 26 May 1984, 09:41 UTC

Progress 21 (Russian: Прогресс 21) was a Soviet uncrewed Progress cargo spacecraft, which was launched in May 1984 to resupply the Salyut 7 space station.

== Launch ==
Progress 21 launched on 7 May 1984 from the Baikonur Cosmodrome in the Kazakh SSR. It used a Soyuz-U rocket.

== Docking ==
Progress 21 docked with the aft port of Salyut 7 on 10 May 1984 at 00:10 UTC, and was undocked on 26 May 1984 at 09:41 UTC.

== Decay ==
It remained in orbit until 26 May 1984, when it was deorbited. The deorbit burn occurred at 15:00:30 UTC, with the mission ending at around 15:45 UTC.

== See also ==
- 1984 in spaceflight
- List of Progress missions
- List of uncrewed spaceflights to Salyut space stations
