= Progress 25 =

Soviet uncrewed Progress cargo spacecraft

- A Progress 7K-TG spacecraft
- Mission type: Mir resupply
- COSPAR ID: 1986-023A
- SATCAT no.: 16645

Spacecraft properties
- Spacecraft: Progress (No.134)
- Spacecraft type: Progress 7K-TG
- Manufacturer: NPO Energia

Start of mission
- Launch date: 19 March 1986, 10:08:25 UTC
- Rocket: Soyuz-U2
- Launch site: Baikonur, Site 1/5

End of mission
- Disposal: Deorbited
- Decay date: 21 April 1986, 00:00 UTC

Orbital parameters
- Reference system: Geocentric
- Regime: Low Earth
- Perigee altitude: 183 km
- Apogee altitude: 251 km
- Inclination: 51.7°
- Period: 88.8 minutes
- Epoch: 19 March 1986

Docking with Mir
- Docking port: Mir Core Module aft
- Docking date: 21 March 1986, 11:16:02 UTC
- Undocking date: 20 April 1986, 19:24:08 UTC

Progress 25 (Russian: Прогресс 25) was a Soviet uncrewed Progress cargo spacecraft, which was launched in March 1986 to resupply the Mir space station.

== Launch ==
Progress 25 launched on 19 March 1986 from the Baikonur Cosmodrome in the Kazakh SSR. It used a Soyuz-U2 rocket.

== Docking ==
Progress 25 docked with the aft port of the Mir Core Module on 21 March 1986 at 11:16:02 UTC, and was undocked on 20 April 1986 at 19:24:08 UTC.

== Decay ==
It remained in orbit until 21 April 1986, when it was deorbited. The deorbit burn occurred at 00:00 UTC and the mission ended at 00:48:30 UTC.

== See also ==
- 1986 in spaceflight
- List of Progress missions
- List of uncrewed spaceflights to Mir
