= Intelsat VA F-11 =

Telecommunications satellite

Intelsat VA F-11 → Intelsat 511
- Mission type: Communication
- Operator: Intelsat
- COSPAR ID: 1985-055A
- SATCAT no.: 15873
- Mission duration: 7 years (planned)

Spacecraft properties
- Bus: Intelsat VA
- Manufacturer: Ford Aerospace
- Launch mass: 1981 kg
- Dry mass: 1098 kg
- Dimensions: 1.66 x 2.1 x 1.77 metres
- Power: 1800 watts

Start of mission
- Launch date: 30 June 1985, 00:44:00 UTC
- Rocket: Atlas G (AC-64)
- Launch site: CCAFS, LC-36B
- Contractor: General Dynamics

End of mission
- Disposal: Graveyard orbit
- Deactivated: August 2003

Orbital parameters
- Reference system: Geocentric orbit
- Regime: Geostationary orbit
- Longitude: 27.5° West (1985-1991); 63.0 East (1991-1992); 177.0° East (1992-1995); 180.0° East (1995-1998); 29.5° West (1998-2003)
- Epoch: 30 June 1985

Transponders
- Band: 26 C-band; 6 Ku-band

Intelsat VA F-11, then named Intelsat 511, was a communications satellite operated by Intelsat. Launched in 1985, it was the eleventh of fifteen Intelsat V satellites to be launched. The Intelsat VA series was constructed by Ford Aerospace, based on the Intelsat VA satellite bus. Intelsat VA F-11 was part of an advanced series of satellites designed to provide greater telecommunications capacity for Intelsat's global network.

== Satellite ==
The satellite was box-shaped, measuring 1.66 by 2.1 by 1.77 metres; solar arrays spanned 15.9 metres tip to tip. The arrays, supplemented by nickel-hydrogen batteries during eclipse, provided 1800 watts of power at mission onset, approximately 1280 watts at the end of its seven-year design life. The payload housed 26 C-band and 6 Ku-band transponders. It could accommodate 15,000 two-way voice circuits and two TV channels simultaneously. It also provided maritime communications for ships at sea.

== Launch ==
The satellite was successfully launched into space on 30 June 1985, at 00:44:00 UTC, by means of an Atlas G-Centaur-D1AR vehicle from the Cape Canaveral Air Force Station, Florida, United States. It had a launch mass of 1981 kg. The satellite was deactivated in August 2003.
