= Progress 24 =

Soviet unmanned Progress cargo spacecraft

- Mission type: Salyut 7 resupply
- COSPAR ID: 1985-051A
- SATCAT no.: 15838
- Mission duration: 24 days, 21 hours and 53 minutes

Spacecraft properties
- Spacecraft: Progress (No.125)
- Spacecraft type: Progress 7K-TG
- Manufacturer: NPO Energia

Start of mission
- Launch date: 21 June 1985, 00:39:41 UTC
- Rocket: Soyuz-U
- Launch site: Baikonur, Site 1/5

End of mission
- Disposal: Deorbited
- Decay date: 15 July 1985, 22:33:31 UTC

Orbital parameters
- Reference system: Geocentric
- Regime: Low Earth
- Perigee altitude: 189 km
- Apogee altitude: 251 km
- Inclination: 51.6°
- Period: 88.9 minutes
- Epoch: 21 June 1985

Docking with Salyut 7
- Docking port: Aft
- Docking date: 23 June 1985, 02:54 UTC
- Undocking date: 15 July 1985, 12:28 UTC
- Time docked: 22 days, 9 hours and 34 minutes

Progress 24 (Russian: Прогресс 24) was a Soviet uncrewed Progress cargo spacecraft, which was launched in June 1985 to resupply the Salyut 7 space station.

== Launch ==
Progress 24 launched on 21 June 1985, from the Baikonur Cosmodrome in the Kazakh SSR. It used a Soyuz-U rocket.

== Docking ==
Progress 24 docked with the aft port of Salyut 7 on 23 June 1985 at 02:54 UTC, and was undocked on 15 July 1985 at 12:28 UTC.

== Decay ==
It remained in orbit until 15 July 1985, when it was deorbited. The deorbit burn occurred at 22:33:31 UTC, with the mission ending at around 23:10 UTC.

== See also ==
- 1985 in spaceflight
- List of Progress missions
- List of uncrewed spaceflights to Salyut space stations
