= Burdock (disambiguation) =

Burdock refers to Arctium, a genus of plants, particularly the species:

- Arctium lappa, or "Greater burdock", a vegetable often referred to by the Japanese name gobō

Burdock may also refer to:

== Fictional characters ==
- Bardock or Burdock, a character in Dragon Ball media
- Fred Burdock, a character in the E/R universe
- Burdock Everdeen, a character in The Hunger Games universe

== Places ==
- Burdock, South Dakota

== Other uses ==
- Burdock piling, a Japanese construction technique
- Dandelion and burdock, a traditional British soft drink
- Burdocks (music), a contemporary musical work by Christian Wolff (composer)

== People with the surname ==
- Jack Burdock (1852–1931), American baseball player
- Leo Burdocks, Dublin's oldest fish and chip shop

== See also ==
- Burdick (disambiguation)
- Burdak
