= Conestoga (rocket) =

Launch vehicle design funded by Space Services Inc.

The Conestoga was a launch vehicle design funded by Space Services Inc. of America (SSIA) of Houston, Texas. Conestoga originally consisted of surplus LGM-30 Minuteman stages with additional strap-on boosters, as required for larger payloads. It was the world's first privately funded commercial rocket, but was launched only three times (once as a modified design) between 1981 and 1995, before the program was shut down.

== History ==
=== Percheron ===
SSIA had originally intended to use a design by Gary Hudson, Percheron, which was intended to dramatically lower the price of space launches. Key to the design was a simple pressure-fed engine burning Kerosene with Liquid Oxygen that was intended to reduce the cost of the expendable booster. Various loads could be accommodated by clustering the basic modules together. SSIA conducted an engine test firing of the Percheron on Matagorda Island on August 5, 1981, but the rocket exploded due to a malfunction. SSIA then asked Hudson to become head of R&D at SSIA, but because they wished to focus on solid fuel rockets, he declined.

=== Conestoga 1 ===
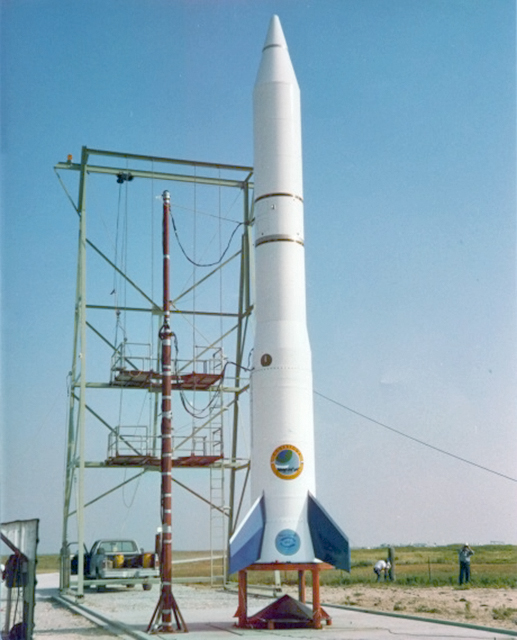
The Conestoga 1 prepared for launch from Matagorda Island.

SSIA founder David Hannah then hired Deke Slayton, one of the original Mercury Seven astronauts. Slayton had just left NASA after running the Space Shuttle Landing and Approach validation testing (among earlier roles). SSIA purchased an Aries research rocket from Space Vector, Inc., which was developed for the U.S. Navy and NASA using the second stage of the Minuteman missile, and used it develop the Conestoga 1. In the final version, this motor would have been topped by two small solid fueled motors, creating a launch capability of around 100 kg to low earth orbit - notionally a M57 (used as a third stage on Minuteman) and a Star-20 (also known as Altair 3A).

The first launch of the new Conestoga 1 design took place on 9 September 1982, consisting of the core missile stage and a 500 kg dummy payload which included 40 gallons of water. The payload was successfully ejected at 313 km, and the Conestoga I became the first privately funded rocket to reach space. However, no orders followed.

=== Starfire ===
SSIA launched a second rocket in 1989, a Black Brant sounding rocket which they referred to as Starfire, to provide commercial support for microgravity experiments.

=== Conestoga 1620 ===
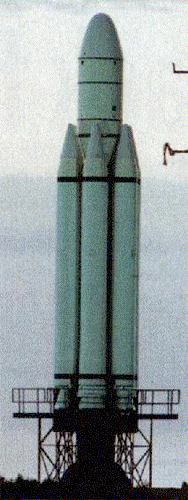
Conestoga 1620, prior to its launch from Wallops Island.

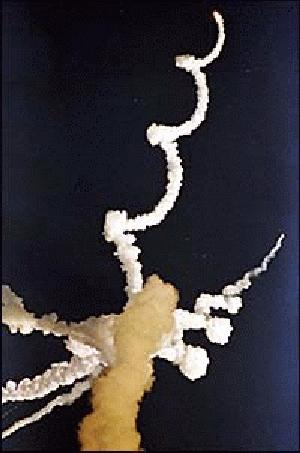
Destruction of the Conestoga 1620.

SSIA was purchased by EER Systems in December 1990. The design was modified again, this time using Castor engines like those used on the Scout, a workhorse of the 1960s. The new design was known as the Conestoga with a four-digit number following it indicating the arrangement of the boosters. The engine bells on the clustered boosters vary depending on their firing order; the larger bells are tuned for higher altitudes.

In May 1990 the Center for Space Transportation and Applied Research (CSTAR) pitched to NASA their Commercial Experiment Transporter (COMET) payload concept, a low-cost standardized bus with both suborbital and orbital components. Mission duration for the COMET would be longer than for existing sounding rockets, and the orbital portion would be free-flight and not disturbed by crew movement as it was on the Space Shuttle. Westinghouse agreed to provide the bus and "service module," Space Industries Inc. built the re-entry module, and EER was contracted to provide several Conestoga launchers.

The entire COMET program quickly ran into delays and budget overruns, and it was not until the end of the program that a COMET (now known as METEOR) and Conestoga 1620 were finally ready for launch.

The 1620 configuration was a four stage design, with two Castor-4B and two Castor-4A engines on the first stage; two Castor-4B on the second stage; one Castor-4B on the third stage and one Star-48V on the fourth stage. The satellite payload included a number of experiments, including material (evaluation of exposure to the harsh space environment) and biological (assessment of seed reaction to microgravity; growth fluids were to be injected into the seed containers after launch), as well as GPS/radar correlation tracking. The satellite included a recoverable section that was to separate on command after several weeks in orbit, fire a small internal retro-motor, and descend for recovery off the Virginia coast.

The launch of Conestoga 1620 took place from a clamshell gantry, which included power and environmental control, at the south end of Wallops Flight Facility pad 0A on 23 October 1995. This pad was purpose built for the rocket. The rocket launched normally, but self-destructed at T+46 seconds. EER determined that an unknown source of low frequency noise had caused the guidance system to order course corrections when none were needed, causing the steering mechanism to eventually run out of hydraulic fluid.

NASA had already decided to deny further funding, due to the original delays, and EER subsequently got out of the rocket business. The remaining assets were purchased by L-3 Communications in 2001 for $110 million.

=== Conestoga 2 ===
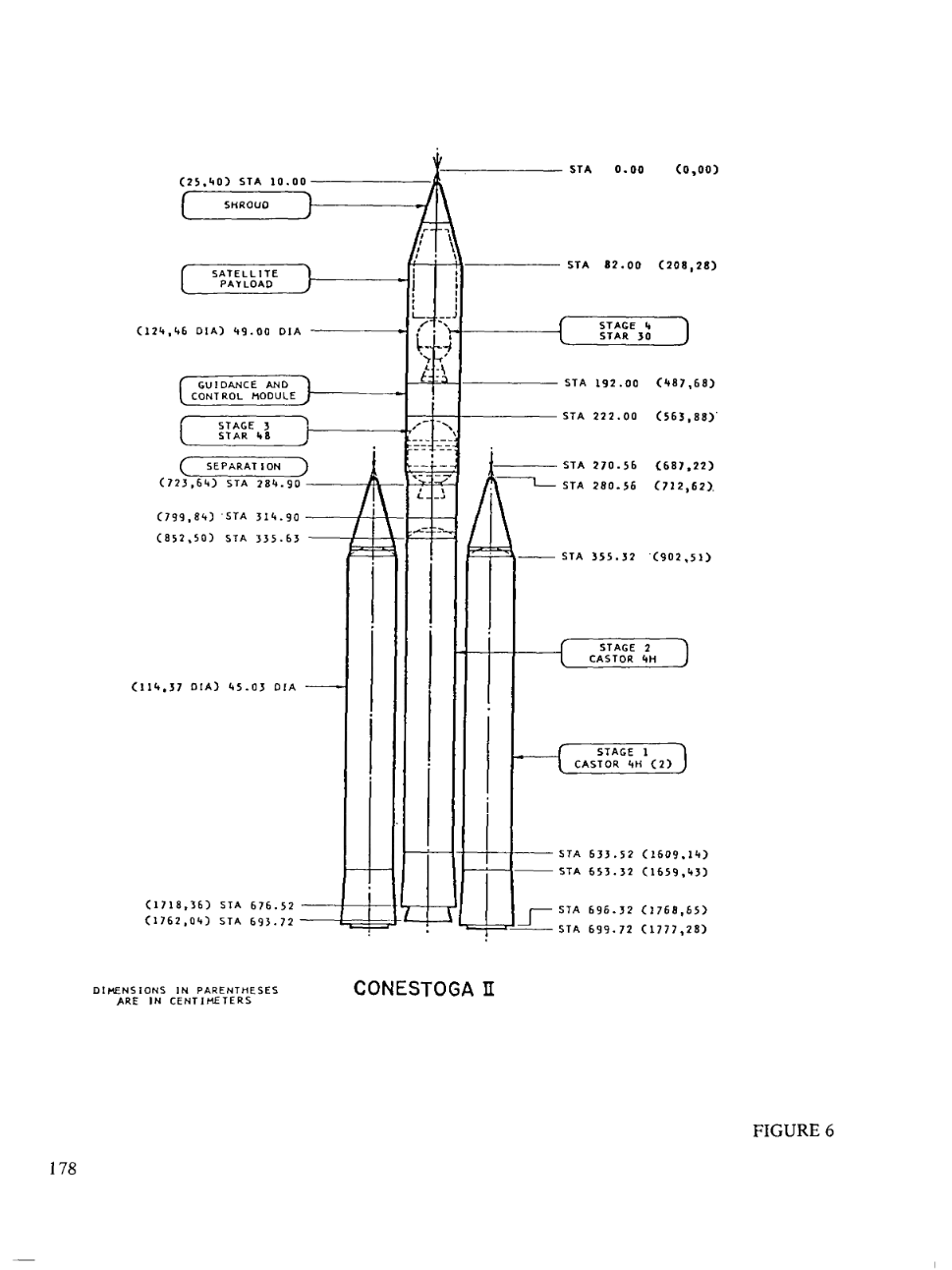
Diagram of the proposed Conestoga II Rocket

Conestoga II was a proposed commercial orbital launch vehicle developed by Space Vector Corporation for Space Services Inc. of America (SSIA) in the early 1980s. Building on the success of the privately funded Conestoga I suborbital rocket, the vehicle was intended to provide low-cost launches for small satellites using proven solid-rocket technology. Company studies projected a growing demand for dedicated small-satellite launch services and promoted Conestoga II as an affordable alternative to larger government-operated launch systems.

== Conestoga versions ==
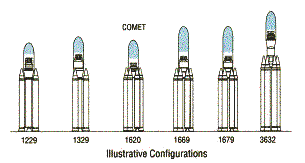
Conestoga versions

Due to the modular design of the Conestoga, a large number of configurations were possible. The version number encoded the configuration:

- the first digit encoded the type of booster motor
- the second digit was the number of booster motors clustered around the core
- the third digit encoded the type of the first upper stage
- the fourth digit encoded the type of the second upper stage

Version	Stages	Stage 1	Stage 2	Stage 3	Stage 4	Stage 5	Payload (kg)
Conestoga 1229	4	2 Castor-4B	1 Castor-4B	Star-48V	HMACS	-	363 kg
Conestoga 1379	4	3 Castor-4B	1 Castor-4B	Star-63V	HMACS	-	770 kg
Conestoga 1620	4	4 Castor-4A/B	2 Castor-4B	1 Castor-4B	Star-48V	-	1179 kg
Conestoga 1669	5	4 Castor-4A/B	2 Castor-4B	1 Castor-4B	Star-63D	HMACS	1361 kg
Conestoga 1679	5	4 Castor-4A/B	2 Castor-4B	1 Castor-4B	Star-63V	HMACS	1497 kg
Conestoga 3632	5	4 Castor-4A/B-XL	2 Castor-4B-XL	1 Castor-4B-XL	Orion-50	Star-48V	2141 kg

== Launch history ==
Date/Time (UTC)	Rocket	Launch site	Payload	Outcome	Apogee	Remarks
1981-08-05	Percheron	Matagorda Island		Failure	0 kilometres (0 mi)	Pad explosion.
1982-09-09, 15:12	Conestoga 1	Matagorda Island	18 kg (40 lb) water	Success	309 kilometres (192 mi)	
1995-10-23, 22:03	Conestoga 1620	Wallops Island	Meteor recoverable experimental satellite	Failure	10 kilometres (6.2 mi)	Hydraulic fluid depletion.

== See also ==
- List of orbital launch systems
- List of space launch system designs
- List of rockets
- Timeline of private spaceflight
