= Burdick =

Burdick may refer to:

== People ==
- Anna Lalor Burdick (1869–1944), American educator
- Bob Burdick (1936–2007), American NASCAR driver
- Burrows Burdick (1823–1899), American physician and politician from Wisconsin
- Chris Burdick (born 1951), American politician from New York
- Clinton D. Burdick (1924–2013), American military pilot
- Eugene Burdick (1918–1965), novelist
- Eugene A. Burdick (1912–2000), judge
- Francis Marion Burdick (1845–1920), American legal scholar
- Harold P. Burdick (1893/1894-1978), American journalist, actor, and writer
- Howard Burdick (1891–1975), American military pilot
- Jefferson Burdick (1900–1963), trading card collector, cataloger, and historian
- Jervis Burdick (1889-1962), American Olympic athlete
- Jocelyn Burdick (1922–2019), American politician
- Linda Drane Burdick (born 1964), American attorney
- Lloyd Burdick (1909–1945), American football player
- Natalia Hussey-Burdick (born 1989), American politician from Hawaii
- Peyton Burdick (born 1997), American baseball player
- Quentin Burdick (1908–1992), husband of Jocelyn
- Richard Burdick (1929–2018), American Boy Scouts commissioner
- Robert Burdick (1630–1692), British America colonial official, legislator, and deacon
- Usher L. Burdick (1879–1960), American politician, father of Quentin
- Walter Burdick (1893–1982), American farmer and politician

== Places ==
Antarctica

- Burdick South Peak, a mountain of Livingston Island
- Burdick West Peak, a mountain of Livingston Island

United States

- Burdick, Indiana, an unincorporated community
- Burdick, Kansas, an unincorporated community
- Burdick Township, Perkins County, South Dakota, a township

== Other uses ==
- Burdick v. United States

== See also ==
- The Mysteries of Harris Burdick, picture book by Chris Van Allsburg
