= Matagorda Peninsula Army Airfield =

- Near Matagorda Island, Texas
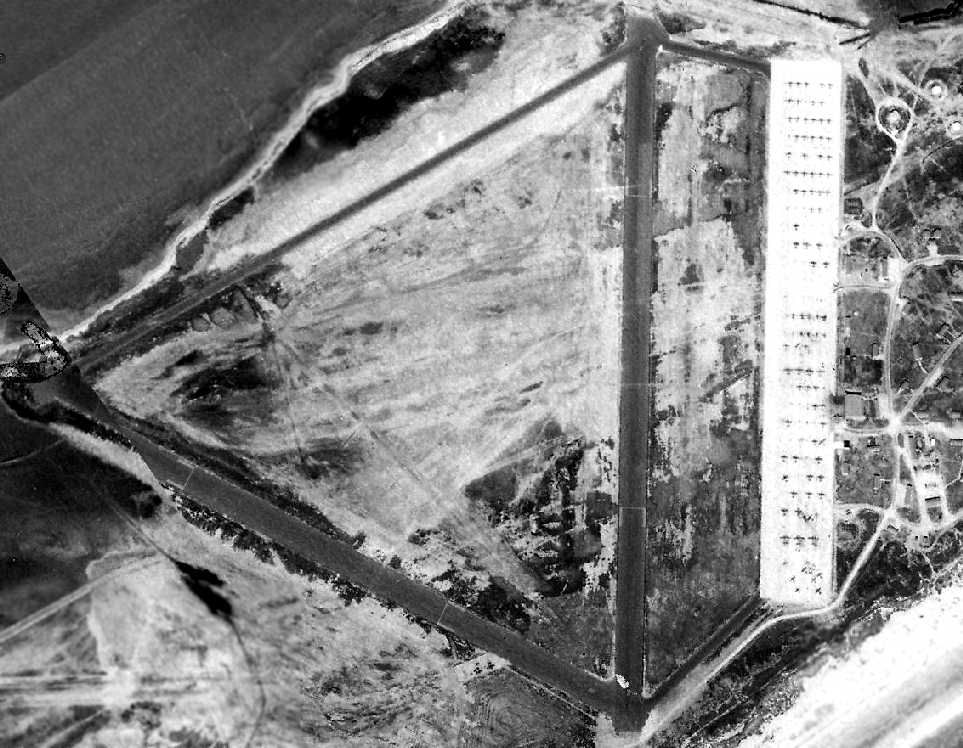
- March 1943 photo showing over 100 aircraft on the Matagorda Peninsula AAF ramp.

Site information
- Condition: Abandoned

Location
- Location of Matagorda Army Airfield
- Coordinates: 28°27′17″N 096°17′54″W

Site history
- Built: 1942
- In use: 1942-1945
- Battles/wars: World War II

Garrison information
- Garrison: United States Army Air Forces
- Occupants: AAF Pilot School (Advanced Single Engine Transition); 77th Flying Training Wing

Airfield information
Runways
Direction	Length and surface
01L/19R	4,000' x 150' (closed) Asphalt
01R/19L	4,000' x 150' (closed) Asphalt
05/23	4,000' x 150' (closed) Asphalt
14L/22R	4,000' x 150' (emergency only) Asphalt
14R/22L	4,000' x 150' (closed) Asphalt

Matagorda Peninsula Army Airfield is a closed military airfield, located on Matagorda Island, Texas. It was used during World War II as a training airfield by the 77th Flying Training Wing, Army Air Forces Central Flying Training Command.

== History ==
=== World War II ===
The airfield was built during 1942 by the Army Air Corps, primarily to support the Matagorda Bombing Range. In addition it was also developed as a training school by Army Air Forces Training Command. Matagorda AAF was the home of the AAF Pilot School (Advanced Single Engine), and also conducted a Single-Engine Pilot Transition school. The major military units assigned were the 62d Single Engine Flying Training Group and 79th Bombardier Training Group.

Initially built with three runways, during the war two additional runways were added to accommodate the large number of landings and takeoffs. Aircraft assigned to the base were North American AT-6 Texans, Curtiss P-40 Warhawks, Republic P-47 Thunderbolts, and North American P-51 Mustangs. A series of curved roads on the east side of the parking ramp had dozens of buildings. After the war ended, the training school was inactivated and the facility was closed in November 1945.

=== Civil use ===
After the war ended, the airfield was transferred to civil control and was known as Matagorda Peninsula Airport.

In the late 1940s, the National Advisory Committee for Aeronautics considered Matagorda Island as a rocket launch site, however Cape Canaveral, Florida was chosen instead.

In the 1980s, a private firm, Space Services, Inc. of America (SSIA), established a rocket launch facility on the island for commercial rockets with the airport, known as Pierce Field, providing aircraft access. They Intended to launch and operate the Percheron rocket out of the airfield, but were later told off by the locals, and moved 34 miles to the very southern end of Matagorda Island to the former Star Brand Ranch of early investor, Toddie Lee Wynne.

- Matagorda Island Air Force Base
- Texas World War II Army Airfields
- 77th Flying Training Wing (World War II)
