= Space Vector Corporation =

- Type: Private
- Industry: Aerospace and Defense
- Founded: 1969
- Founder: Richard Rasmussen
- Headquarters: Chatsworth, California
- Key people: Eric Grabow, President
- Website: spacevector.com

Space Vector Corporation (SVC) is a United States-based company that provides aerospace products and services to government and commercial customers. Space Vector is headquartered in Chatsworth, California and is a privately held small business. Its primary products are flight safety and system batteries, GPS tracking systems, custom avionics and structures, attitude control systems, pneumatic components, and separation systems. Space Vector also provides launch services as a prime contractor under the Space and Missile Systems Center (SMC) Sounding Rocket Program (SRP-3) which includes performing vehicle integration activities, end-to-end system testing, payload integration, launch operations, and mission analysis and design.

== History ==
Space Vector was founded in 1969 to supply NASA with Miniature Inertial Digital Attitude System (MIDAS) platforms and reaction control systems for use on sounding rockets. In 1972, Space Vector secured the right to use surplus Minuteman I motors for guided, suborbital rockets which it later names Aries. Over the next 20 years Space Vector successfully launched 30 Aries rockets in support of a variety of microgravity scientific experiments. Based on its experience working with Minuteman assets, Space Vector was tasked by Lockheed in 1980 to help develop the Homing Overlay Experiment (HOE) booster for the U.S. Army which would go on to become the first successful hit-to-kill intercept of a mock ballistic missile warhead outside the Earth's atmosphere. This technology was later used by the Strategic Defense Initiative (SDI) and expanded into the Exoatmospheric Reentry-vehicle Interception System (ERIS) program. In 1982 Space Vector was tapped by Space Services Inc. of America (SSIA) to fabricate and launch the Conestoga 1 off Matagorda Island, Texas which became the first privately funded rocket to reach space.

In 1992 Space Vector teamed with Coleman Research Corporation (now a division of L-3 Communications) and Aerotherm to provide the Army Space and Missile Defense Command (SMDC) with 25 Hera target vehicles to support testing of THAAD and Patriot PAC-3 anti-ballistic missile systems. Space Vector went on to earn the distinction in 1997 as the first company to air launch a Minuteman-based target vehicle. The single stage AltAir vehicle was developed by Space Vector for the United States Air Force to demonstrate the feasibility of the air drop concept. The U.S. Air Force awarded Space Vector a prime contract in 1997 to provide launch services for the Sounding Rocket Program (SRP). Under its first delivery order to SMC Space Vector fabricated a 2-stage medium-range ballistic missile (MRBM) target and successfully launched it from the Kodiak Launch Complex, Alaska in order to exercise the PAVE Phased Array Warning System (PAVE PAWS) radar located at Beale Air Force near Marysville, California.

Space Vector shifted its focus in 2002 to providing high reliability aerospace systems and components to large prime contractors such as Lockheed Martin on programs like Targets and Countermeasures (T&C) and Payload Launch Vehicle (PLV). As a member of Team Air Launch in 2005, Space Vector worked on the DARPA funded FALCON small launch vehicle program with the goal of placing 1,000 lbs into low Earth orbit (LEO). Space Vector fabricated a Vapak pressure fed coaxial pintle injector engine and the Storage and Launch Carrier (SLC) system used to deploy the 72,000 lbs, 60 foot long vehicle from the back of an unmodified C-17 cargo aircraft.

A non-ordnance separation system was developed by Space Vector in 2007 to separate large vehicle stages and payloads without explosive bolts or cutters to minimize shock and debris. A 50-inch version was qualified and delivered to ATK for use on their ALV X-1 flight test vehicle launched out of NASA's Wallops Flight Facility. Space Vector was awarded a contract in 2008 from the United Launch Alliance (ULA) to develop and supply the GPS tracking unit (GTU) and low noise amplifiers used to provide Range Safety with real-time metric tracking data on the Atlas V and Delta IV Evolved Expendable Launch Vehicles (EELV). The first flight of the GPS metric tracking system occurred in 2012 from Cape Canaveral, Florida, with the system being fully certified a year later after the fourth flight from Vandenberg Air Force Base. Contracts were awarded to Space Vector in 2013 from ULA to fabricate the mission critical Fuel Level Sensing System for Delta II and to develop a new Fuel Depletion Probe for Atlas V.

== Gallery ==
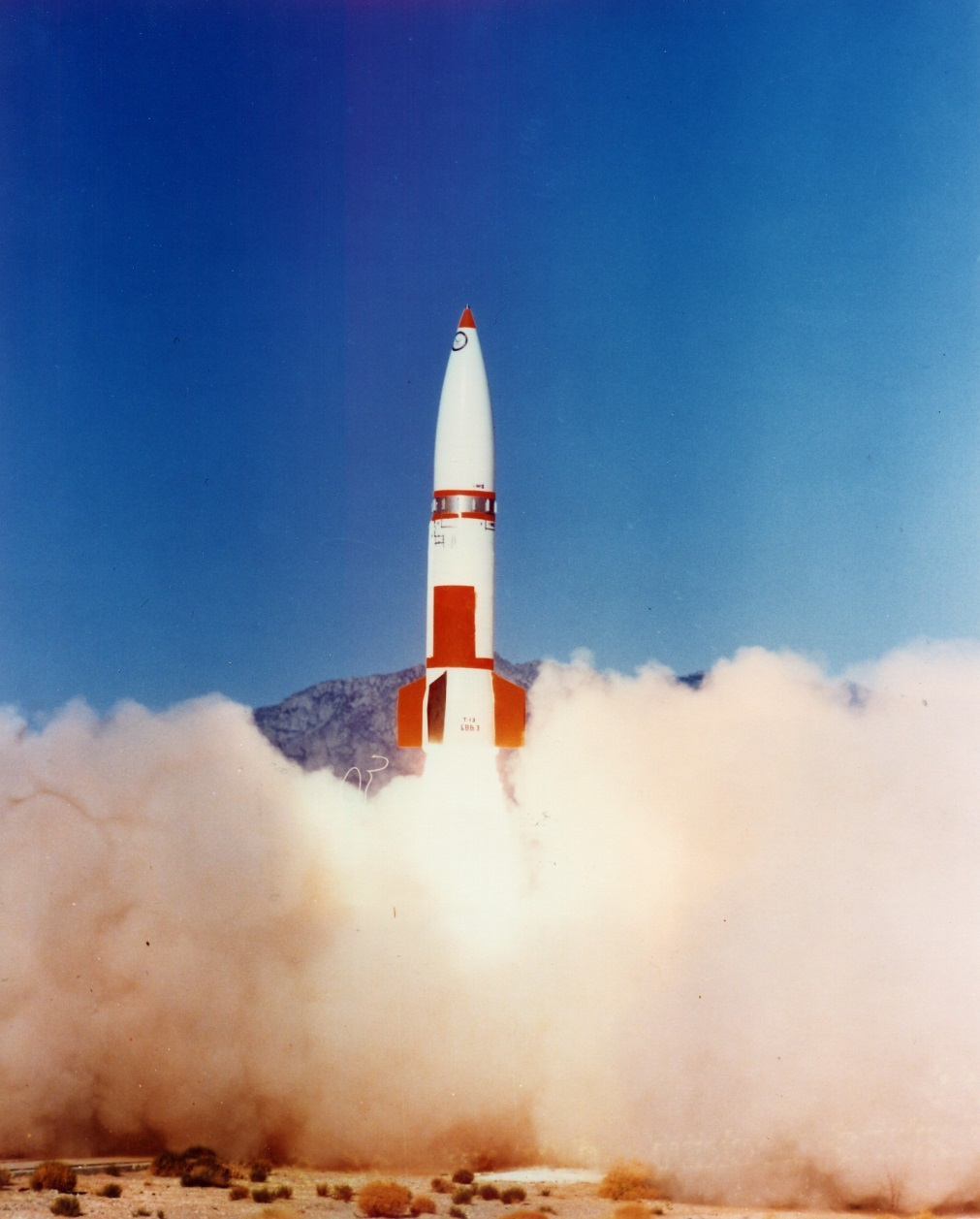
Early Aries test vehicle, June 18, 1974. White Sands Missile Range, New Mexico.

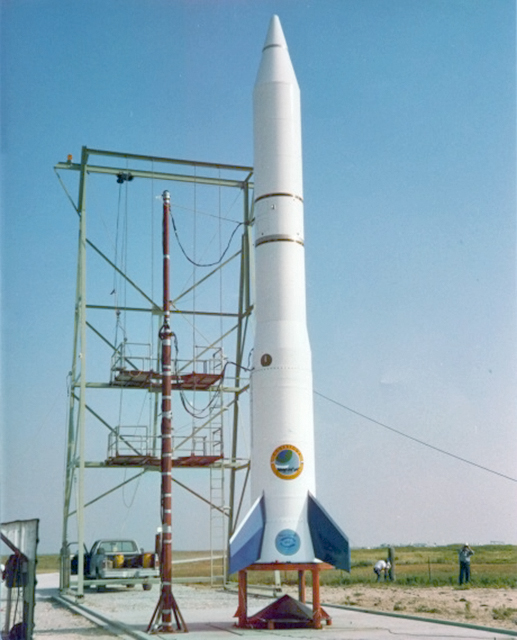
Conestoga I, September 9, 1982. Matagorda Island, Texas.

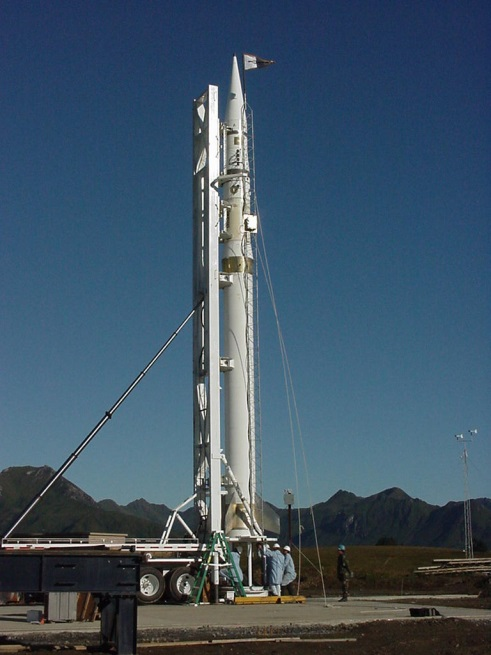
Ait-2 vehicle on stand, September 15, 1999. Kodiak Launch Complex, Alaska.

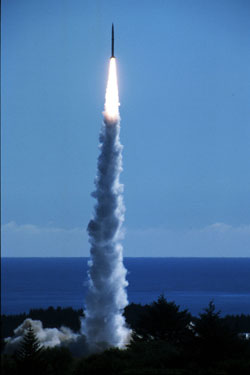
Launch of Ait-2, September 15, 1999. Kodiak Launch Complex, Alaska.

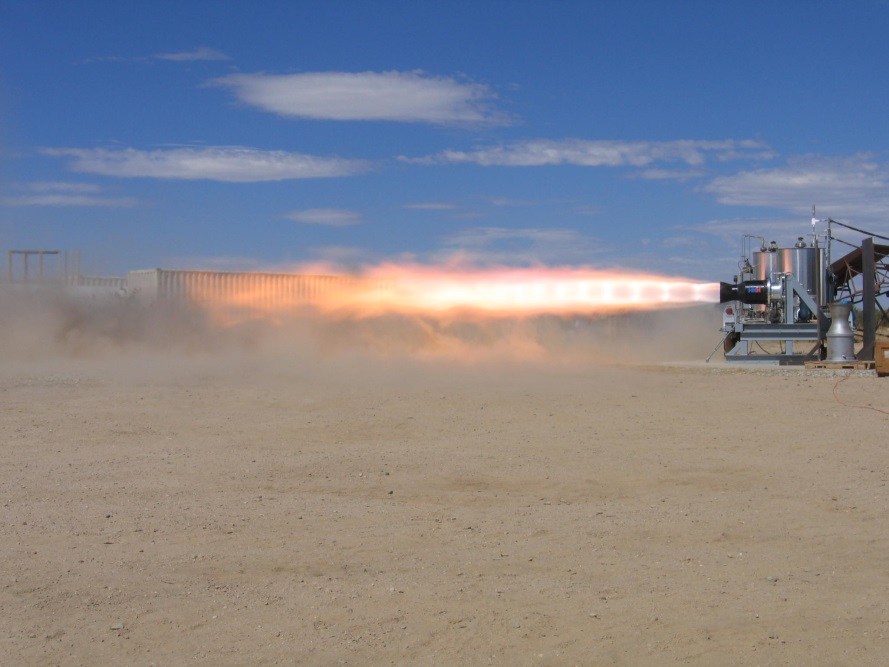
FALCON SLV stage 2 engine test, June 28, 2005. Mojave, California.

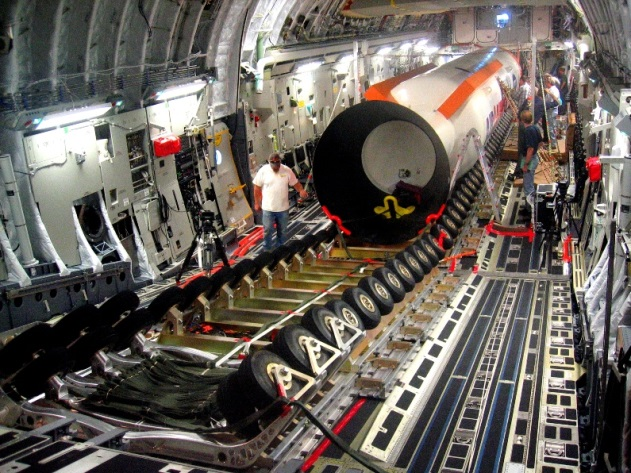
FALCON SLV Drop Test 1 in C-17 Aircraft, September 29, 2005. Edwards Air Force Base, California.
