= Clinton D. Burdick =

American flying ace (1924–2013)

Clinton DeWitt Burdick
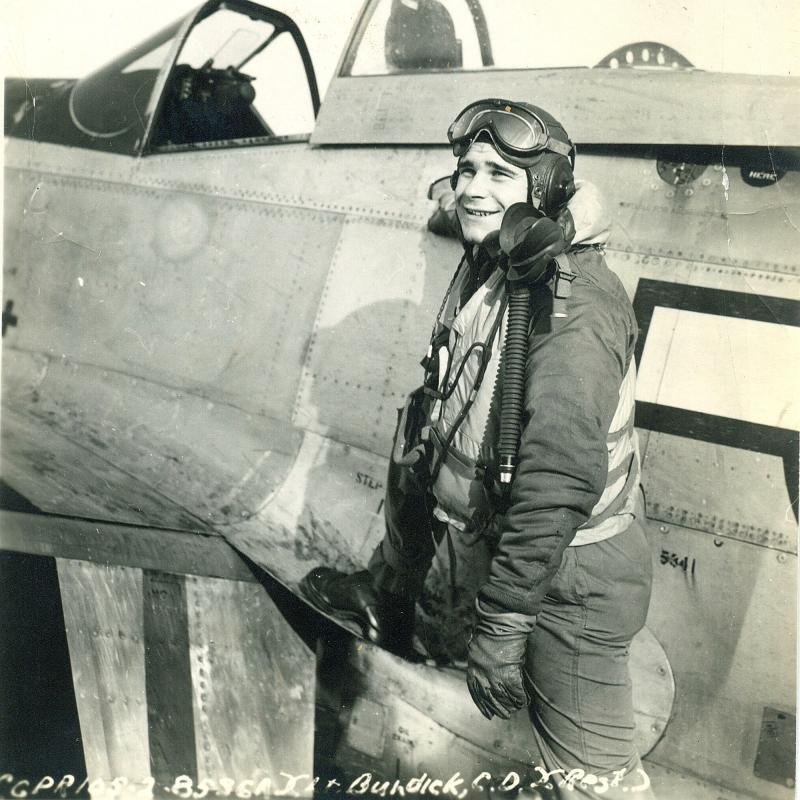
- Born: July 26, 1924; Brooklyn, New York City, U.S.
- Died: February 17, 2013 (aged 88)
- Relatives: Howard Burdick (father)
- Military career
- Allegiance: United States of America
- Branch: United States Army Air Forces
- Service years: 1942–1946
- Rank: Captain
- Nickname: Clint
- Units: 361st Fighter Squadron, 356th Fighter Group
- Conflicts: World War II
- Awards: Distinguished Flying Cross; Air Medal (9)

Clinton DeWitt Burdick (July 26, 1924 – February 17, 2013) was an American flying ace in the 356th Fighter Group during World War II. He was the son of American World War I flying ace Howard Burdick, who was credited with eight aerial victories.

== Early life ==
Burdick was born in 1924 in Brooklyn.

== Military career ==
He was influenced by his father to enlist in the Aviation Cadet Program of the U.S. Army Air Forces, which he did on October 21, 1942. He did his basic training in Fort Worth, Texas, where he flew BT-13s and proceeded with advanced training, where he trained on the AT-6. On March 12, 1944, Burdick was commissioned a second lieutenant and awarded his pilot wings at Foster Field in Texas. After graduation, he attended aerial gunnery school on Matagorda Island, where he flew the P-40 Warhawk.

=== World War II ===
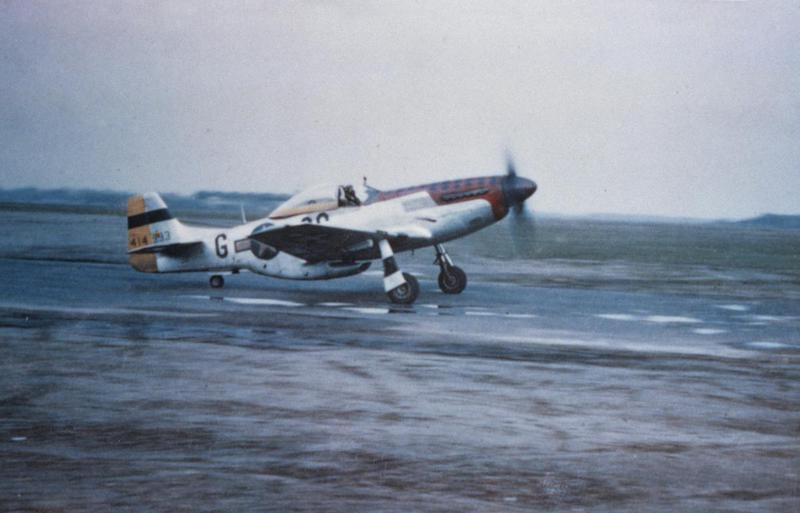
P-51 Mustang of the 356th Fighter Group

In September 1944, he was assigned to the 361st Fighter Squadron, 356th Fighter Group at RAF Martlesham Heath in England, where he flew missions in the European theater of World War II.

Flying P-47 Thunderbolts, Burdick flew his first combat mission on November 6, 1944, and in the same month, the 356th FG converted to P-51 Mustangs. While flying the P-51, he scored his first aerial victory on December 5, when he shot down a Focke-Wulf Fw 190 and damaged another Fw 190 northeast of Berlin. On January 14, 1945, 356th FG's P-51s encountered 15 to 20 Fw 190s, southwest of Dümmer Lake. During the aerial battle, Burdick shot down two Fw 190s and damaged another two.

He finally became a flying ace on February 20, when he shot down three (including one shared) Fi 156s over Bayreuth, which were also his last aerial victories of the war. This made Burdick and his father the only father and son to earn the title of flying ace. He flew his last combat mission on February 20.

During World War II, Burdick was credited with the destruction of 5.5 enemy aircraft in aerial combat plus 3 damaged, 1 shared destruction, and 1 destroyed on the ground, while flying 53 combat missions during the war. During his time in the 356th FG, he flew P-51D bearing the name "DoDo". He is one of only five flying aces in the 356th FG.

== Later life ==
Burdick and his wife Connie had a son and several grandchildren.

After the end of World War II, Burdick was discharged from the military in 1946. He attended Massachusetts Institute of Technology, where he graduated with a Bachelor's degree in aeronautical engineering in 1950. In 1952, he graduated from MIT with a master's degree in aeronautical engineering. At the age of 25, his parents divorced and his father moved to California where he remarried. In 1963, he moved to Los Angeles where his father resided and eventually reconciled with him. Burdick worked in the aviation and electronics industry until his complete retirement in 1989.

He died on February 17, 2013, at the age of 88.

== Summary of enemy aircraft damaged/destroyed ==
Date	Location	Air/Ground	Number	Type	Status
November 25, 1944	Zwickau, Germany	Ground	1	Fw 190	Destroyed
December 5, 1944	Berlin, Germany	Air	1	Fw 190	Destroyed
December 5, 1944	Berlin, Germany	Air	1	Fw 190	Damaged
January 14, 1945	Dümmer Lake, Germany	Air	2	Fw 190	Destroyed
January 14, 1945	Dümmer Lake, Germany	Air	2	Fw 190	Damaged
February 20, 1945	Bayreuth, Germany	Air	2.5	Fi 156	Destroyed

All information on enemy aircraft damaged and destroyed is from Stars and Bars.

== Awards and decorations ==
His awards include:

USAAF Pilot Badge
Distinguished Flying Cross
Air Medal with one silver and three bronze oak leaf clusters
Army Good Conduct Medal
American Campaign Medal
European-African-Middle Eastern Campaign Medal with three bronze campaign stars
World War II Victory Medal

Army Presidential Unit Citation

- Congressional Gold Medal (2015)
