= Matagorda Island Air Force Base =

- Matagorda Island General Bombing and Gunnery Range
- Near Matagorda Island, Texas
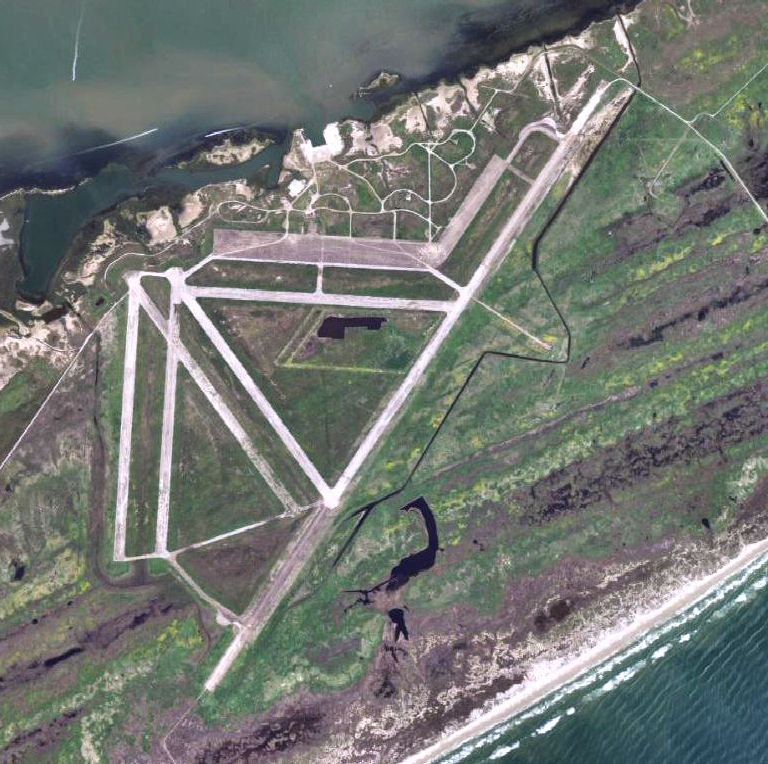
- 2006 USGS digital orthophoto of Matagorda Island Air Force Base in Texas

Site information
- Open to the public: yes
- Condition: Abandoned

Location
- Location of Matagorda Island Air Force Base
- Coordinates: 28°19′36″N 096°27′47″W

Site history
- Built: 1943
- In use: 1943-1945; 1949-1975
- Battles/wars: World War II Korean War Vietnam War Korean DMZ Conflict

Garrison information
- Past commanders: 79th Flying Training Wing (Flexible Gunnery) (1943-1945); Strategic Air Command (1949-1975)
- Garrison: United States Army Air Forces; United States Air Force

Airfield information
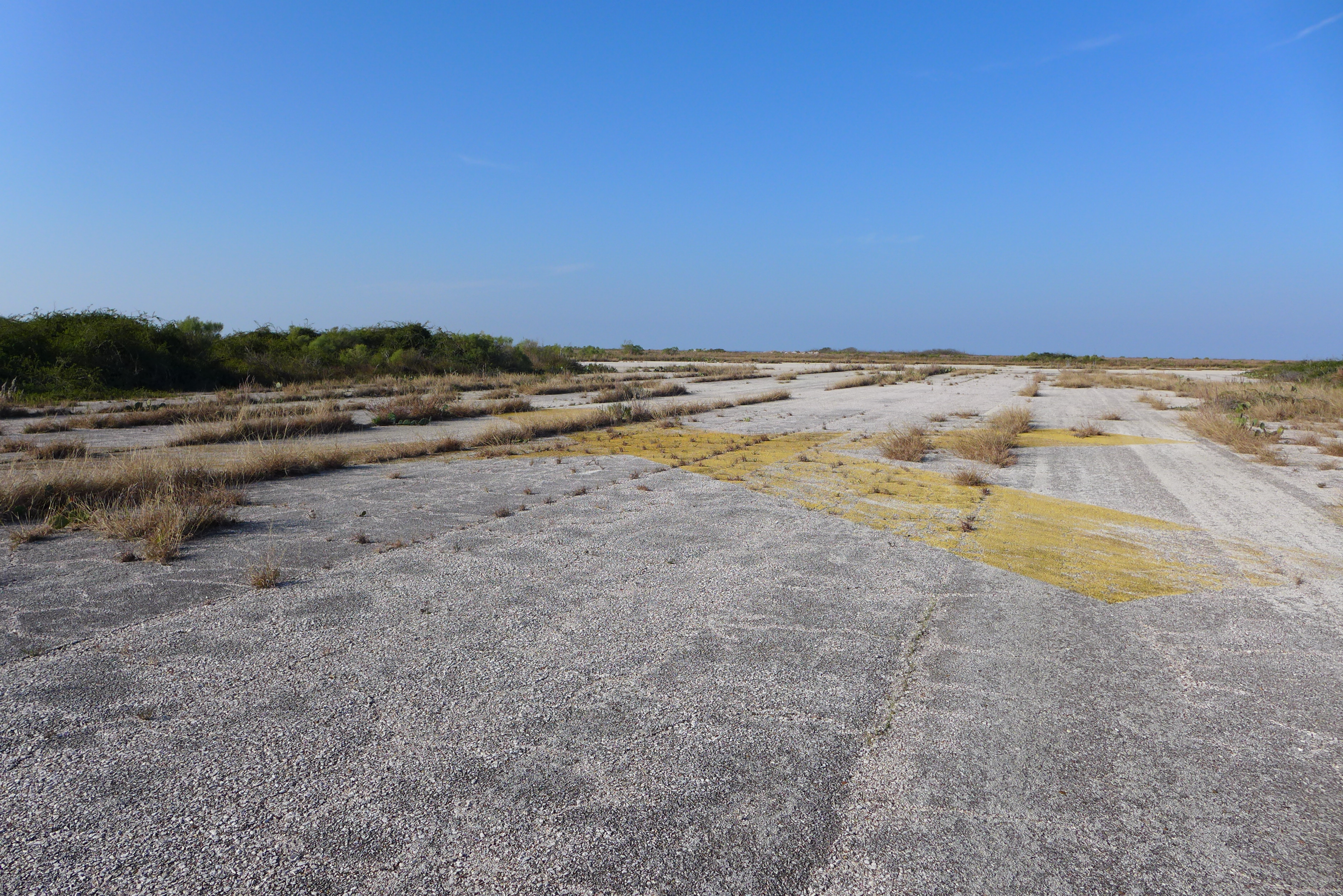

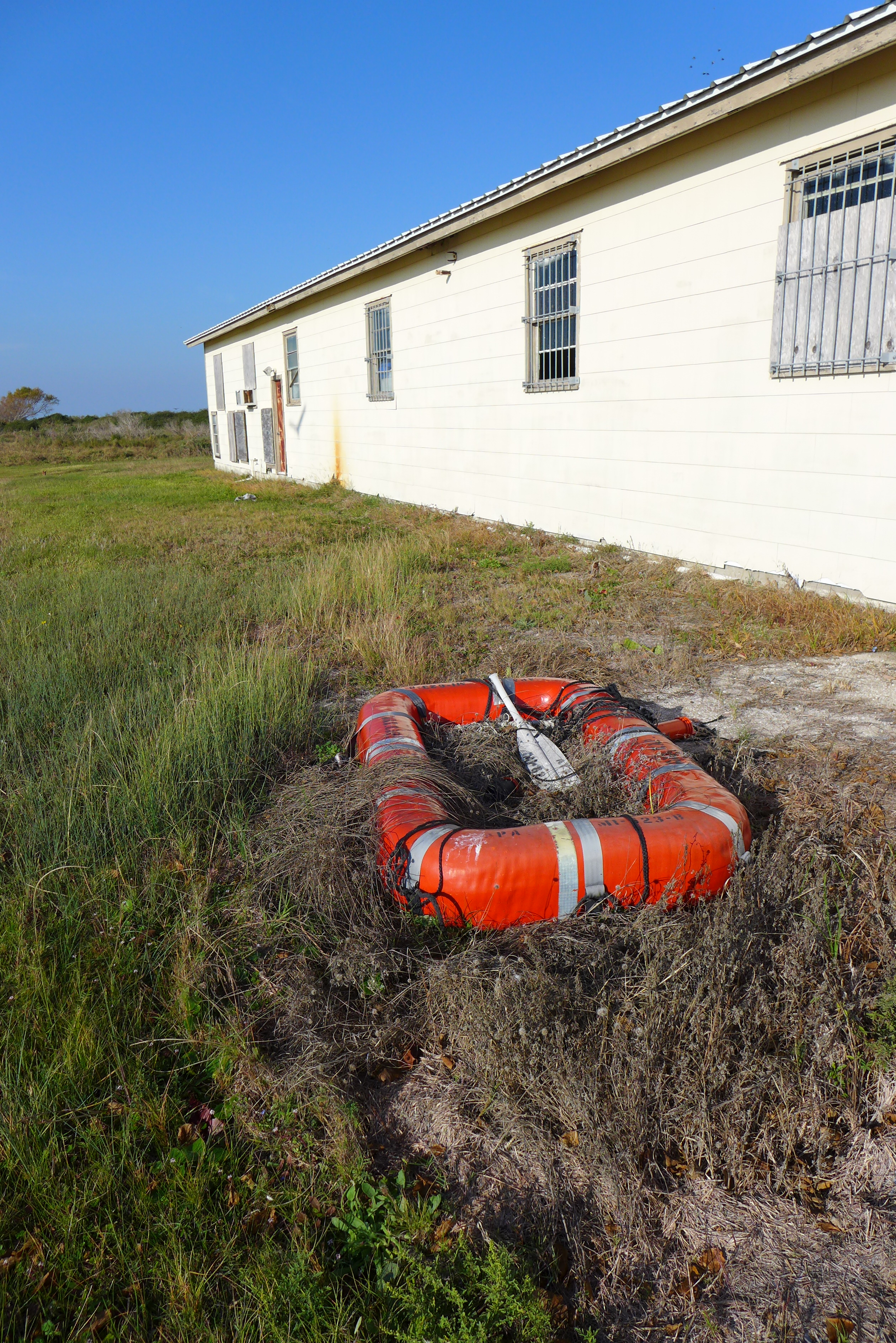
Runways
Direction	Length and surface
03/21	8,000' x 150' (closed) Concrete
09/27	4,000' x 150' (closed) Concrete
14L/32R	4,000' x 150' (closed) Concrete
14R/32L	4,000' x 150' (closed) Concrete
01L/19R	4,000' x 150' (closed) Concrete
01R/19L	4,000' x 150' (closed) Concrete

Matagorda Island Air Force Base (/ˈmætəˈɡɔːrdə/) is a closed military airfield on the north end of Matagorda Island, northeast of Corpus Christi, Texas. It was closed by the United States Air Force in 1975.

== History ==
=== World War II ===
The original airfield was built in 1942 as Matagorda Island General Bombing and Gunnery Range. It supported the USAAF Gulf Coast Training Center pilot training in the Southeast United States. The airfield originally had three runways, with a large L-shaped concrete parking apron. It was under the control of Foster Field, Victoria, Texas, as a sub-base. The range had four squadrons (856th, 857th, 858th, 859th) Single-Engine Gunnery Squadrons assigned, flying the North American T-6 Texan, under the control of the 62d Single-Engined Flying Training Group, 79th Flying Training Wing. Aircraft from other training schools also used the airfield. The range was supported by the Matagorda Peninsula Army Airfield, a separate facility north of the range. During the war, an additional three runways were built to accommodate the large number of landings and takeoffs.

The facility was closed on 3 February 1945, and placed in a standby status.

=== Strategic Air Command ===
During the Cold War, in 1949, the United States Air Force Strategic Air Command reactivated the range and refurbished the runways. Runway 03/21 was extended to 8,000 ft to accommodate jet fighters, along with SAC B-29 and B-50 Superfortress bombers. The Air Force renamed the facility Matagorda Island Air Force Base. It built a dock, a large number of roads, and buildings on the base to accommodate personnel to support the gunnery and bombing range.

During its operational lifetime, the range was controlled by Carswell AFB and Bergstrom AFB, Texas, and Chennault Air Force Base and Barksdale AFB, Louisiana as a sub-base. Aircraft from both SAC and Tactical Air Command (TAC) and various Air National Guard squadrons used the facility.

In 1965, the Reeves AN/MSQ-77 Bomb Directing Central system was tested by the 1st Combat Evaluation Group at the range for Combat Skyspot ground-directed bombing in the Vietnam War. Because of its remote island location with limited access, during the Vietnam War, the facility was also used by Air Commando and other units, possibly under the direction of national intelligence agencies for training.

=== Current use ===
The base was deactivated in 1975 after the end of United States' involvement in Vietnam. The property was subsequently turned over to the Department of the Interior as a federal wildlife refuge.

Today, the runways and taxiways, although infested with vegetation, are in very good condition. The several structures, hangars, and buildings of various types are in various stages of deterioration. Also, a usable dock and a small port facility are available. Metal detecting is strictly forbidden at Matagorda AFB.

== See also ==
- Texas World War II Army Airfields
