= Deke Slayton =

American astronaut (1924–1993)

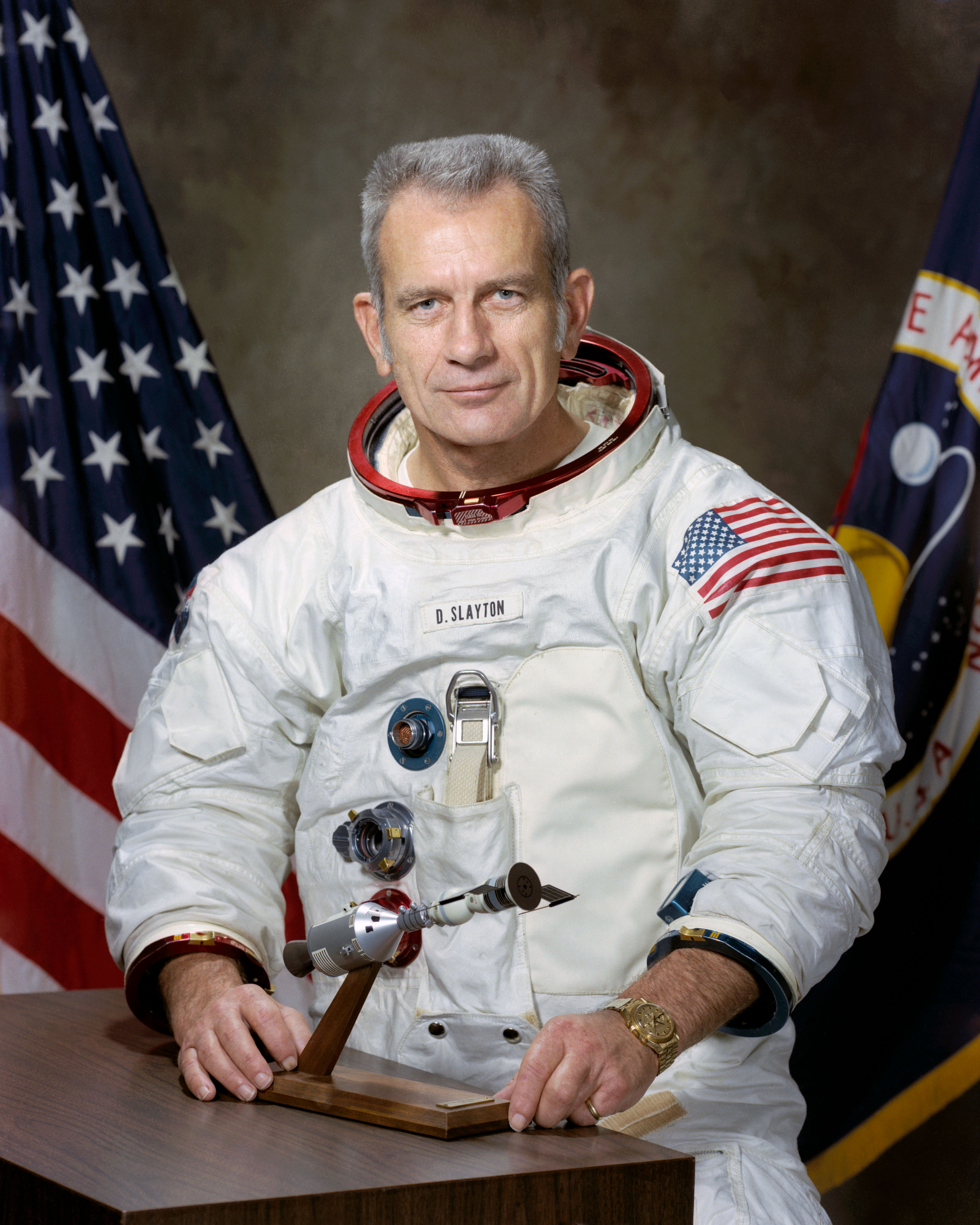
- Slayton in 1973
- Born: Donald Kent Slayton; March 1, 1924; Sparta, Wisconsin, U.S.
- Died: June 13, 1993 (aged 69); League City, Texas, U.S.
- Education: University of Minnesota (BS)
- Spouses: Marjorie Lunney (m. 1955; div. 1978) Bobbie Belle Jones (m. 1983)
- Children: 1
- Awards: Distinguished Flying Cross; NASA Distinguished Service Medal; Collier Trophy; James H. Doolittle Award
- Space career

NASA astronaut
- Rank: Major, USAF
- Time in space: 9d 1h 28m
- Selection: NASA Group 1 (1959)
- Mission: Apollo–Soyuz Test Project
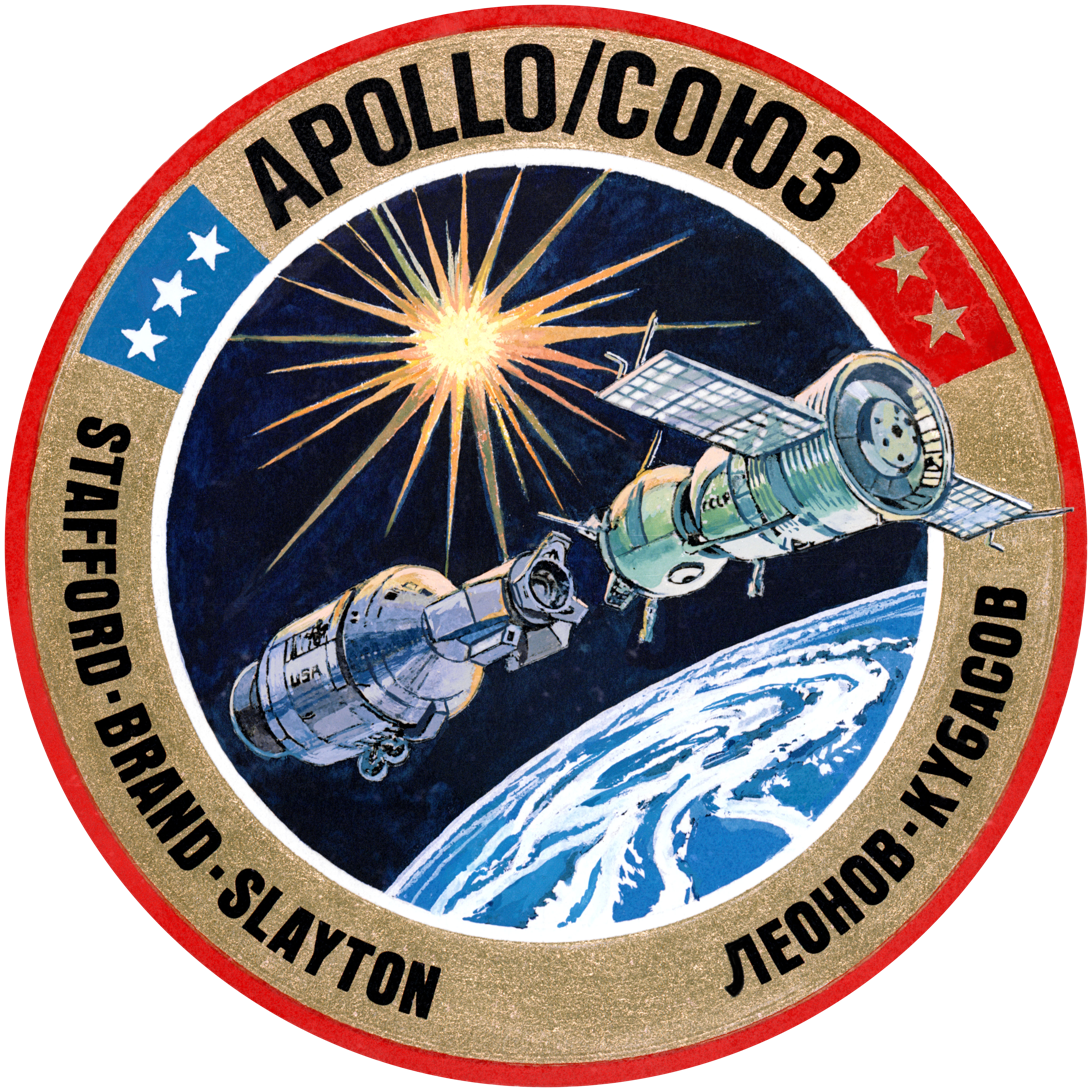
- Mission insignia
- Retired: February 27, 1982

Donald Kent "Deke" Slayton (March 1, 1924 – June 13, 1993) was an American Air Force pilot, aeronautical engineer, test pilot, and one of the original Mercury Seven astronauts. He went on to become NASA's first chief of the Astronaut Office and director of Flight Crew Operations, responsible for NASA crew assignments.

Slayton joined the U.S. Army Air Forces during World War II, and flew in the Europe and the Pacific theaters. He left the Army after World War II, went on to receive a Bachelor of Science degree in aeronautical engineering from University of Minnesota in 1949, and later joined the Minnesota Air National Guard after working for Boeing as an aeronautical engineer. He joined the United States Air Force, and attended the U.S. Air Force Test Pilot School in 1955. In 1959, he applied to, and was selected as one of the Mercury Seven, NASA's first class of astronauts. Slayton was scheduled to pilot the second U.S. crewed orbital spaceflight, but was grounded in 1962 by atrial fibrillation, an irregular heart rhythm. In March 1972, he was medically cleared to fly and was the docking module pilot of the 1975 Apollo–Soyuz Test Project (ASTP). Slayton continued to work at NASA until 1982. He also helped develop the Space Shuttle.

Slayton died from brain cancer on June 13, 1993, aged 69.

== Early life and career ==
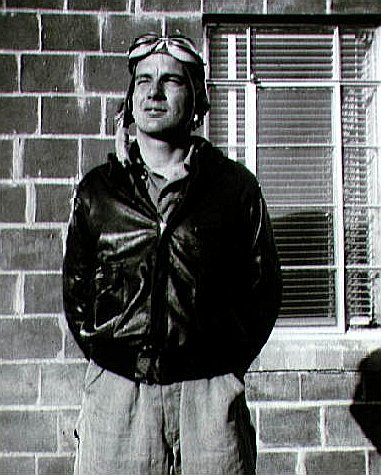
Deke Slayton as a bomber pilot during World War II

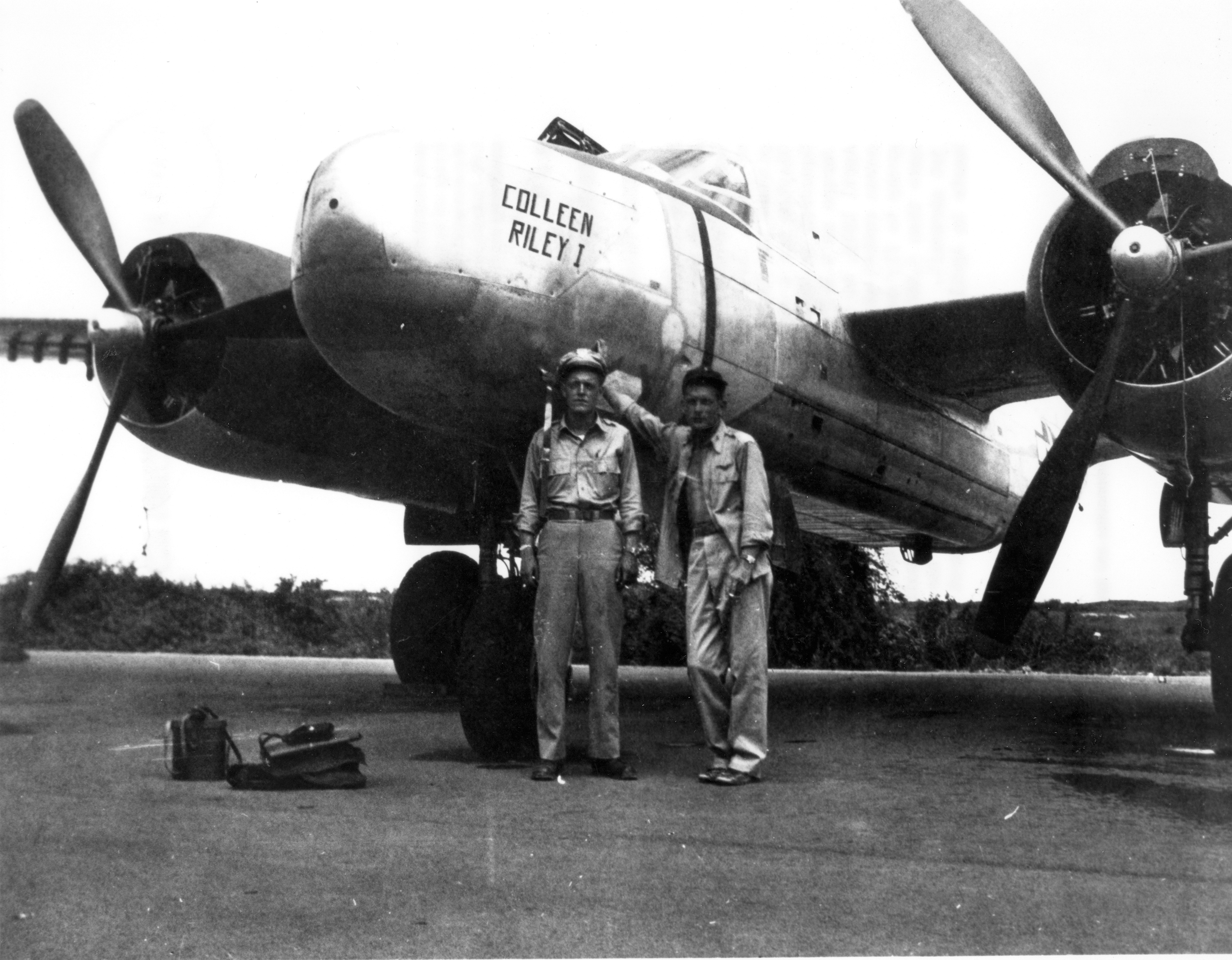
Deke Slayton (right) beside a Douglas A-26 bomber

Donald Kent Slayton was born on March 1, 1924, on a farm near Leon, Wisconsin, to Charles Sherman Slayton and Victoria Adelia Slayton (née Larson). He was of English and Norwegian descent. From a young age, he worked on the farm to raise sheep and cows, and grow tobacco. Throughout Slayton's childhood, his family's home did not have electricity or indoor plumbing. At the age of five, Slayton was clearing a horse-drawn hay mower when his left ring finger was severed. He attended a two-room elementary school in Leon, and graduated from Sparta High School in 1942, where he boxed, played trombone, and was active in the Future Farmers of America (FFA).

=== World War II ===
The 1941 attack on Pearl Harbor by the Empire of Japan occurred during Slayton's senior year of high school. He initially wished to join the U.S. Navy, but joined the U.S. Army Air Forces when it began accepting high school graduates to fly. (Note: The United States Navy required its pilots to have a college degree.) After graduation, Slayton moved to San Antonio, Texas, and entered the Aviation Cadet Training Program. He was initially medically delayed because of his severed left ring finger, but was deemed able to fly. Slayton began flight training in Vernon, Texas, where he trained on the Fairchild PT-19, the PT-17 Stearman, and the AT-6 Texan. After three months of primary training, Slayton moved to Waco, Texas, for basic flight training, where he flew the BT-13 Valiant. Despite Slayton's wishes to fly single-engine fighter aircraft, he was selected to fly multi-engine aircraft. Slayton began multi-engine training on the Beechcraft AT-10, Cessna AT-17, and the Curtiss AT-9. Slayton graduated from flight training on April 22, 1943, and was assigned to fly on the North American B-25 Mitchell, his last choice for aircraft.

Slayton moved to Columbia Army Air Base in South Carolina for the three-month-long B-25 Mitchell training. After completing training, he was assigned to the 340th Bombardment Group, and departed for the European theater of operations on ship from Newport News, Virginia. After a stop in Zerni, North Africa, his convoy traveled to Naples, Italy. While traveling near the Strait of Gibraltar, their ships came under attack from German bombers and submarines. After he arrived in Naples, the 340th Bombardment Group moved to San Petrazio, where Slayton flew combat missions into the Balkan Peninsula. After six weeks, he moved to Foggia, where 48 aircraft were destroyed after an eruption of Mount Vesuvius. Afterwards, Slayton flew out of Salerno and Corsica, where he upgraded from copilot to pilot. After 56 combat sorties, Slayton completed his combat tour and returned to the U.S. in May 1944.

Immediately upon his return to Columbia Army Air Base to serve as a B-25 instructor, Slayton applied and was accepted to fly the new Douglas A-26 Invader bomber aircraft. He moved to Selfridge Field in Michigan for training, and began preparing for a deployment to the Pacific. In July 1945, he arrived on Okinawa Island and joined the 319th Bombardment Group. He flew seven combat missions over Japan, and encountered little Japanese resistance. Slayton flew his final combat mission on August 12, three days after the bombing of Nagasaki and spent two months waiting for his return to the U.S. After the war, Slayton worked as B-25 instructor in Albany, Georgia, and Boca Raton, Florida and separated from the Army in November 1946.

=== Post-World War II ===
After he was discharged from the Army, Slayton enrolled at the University of Minnesota, in Minneapolis, and studied aeronautical engineering. As a student, he supported himself using the GI Bill and by working at a Montgomery Ward warehouse. He graduated with a Bachelor of Science degree in 1949, and accepted a job as an engineer with the Boeing Aircraft Corporation at Seattle, Washington. After moving to Seattle, Slayton lived in a rooming house and began working as a junior design engineer. While at Boeing, he worked on the B-52 Stratofortress and the KC-97 Stratofreighter.

While he was a college student, Slayton joined the Air Force Reserve, and was a T-6 Texan pilot flying out of Minneapolis–Saint Paul International Airport. He transitioned to the Minnesota Air National Guard (ANG), after accepting a demotion from captain to second lieutenant, to allow him to fly the A-26 Invader and P-51 Mustang. He left the Minnesota ANG when he moved to Seattle. Slayton attempted to join an Air Force Reserve unit in Seattle at the start of the Korean War, but was rejected on the grounds that his inactive reserve status had expired. He contacted his previous squadron commander in Minnesota and accepted his offer to rejoin his former squadron in February 1951. Upon his return, Slayton was initially medically disqualified from flying for his eyesight. He served as a maintenance officer while waiting for his medical clearance and then became a maintenance flight test officer once he had returned to flying status.

In 1952, Slayton transferred to active duty Air Force from the Air National Guard. After completing his education at Air Command and Staff School, he was assigned as a maintenance inspector at Twelfth Air Force Headquarters in Wiesbaden Army Airfield, West Germany. He additionally served as an F-86 Sabre pilot and maintenance officer with the 36th Fighter Day Wing at Bitburg Air Base, West Germany. While stationed in Germany, he met Marjorie Lunney and married her on May 18, 1955.

At the start of his assignment in West Germany, Slayton applied to the U.S. Air Force Test Pilot School (TPS), but was rejected on the basis that he had to complete his current three-year assignment. He reapplied and was accepted in 1955, and joined TPS Class 55C. After graduating in December 1955, he became a test pilot at the Flight Test Center at Edwards Air Force Base, California. He tested the F-101, F-102, F-104, F-105 and F-106. He was first assigned to the F-102, and tested the Matador and Genie missiles, and later tested the stall-spin characteristics of the F-105. In 1958, he helped test Britain's first supersonic fighter, the English Electric P1B Lightning.

== NASA career ==
=== Mercury Seven ===
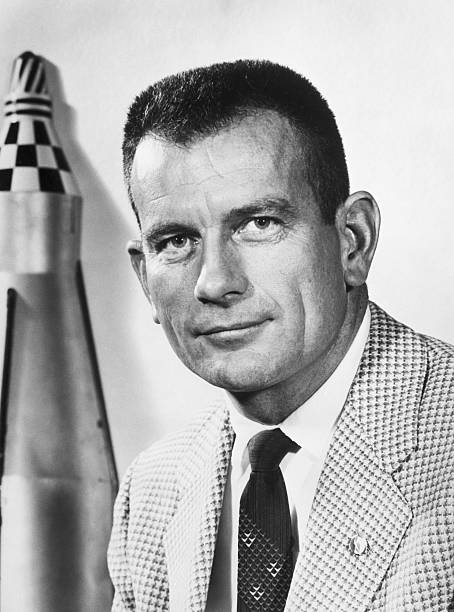
Deke Slayton

In January 1959, Slayton was selected as one of the candidates for NASA's Project Mercury, the first U.S. crewed space flight program. Despite his initial lack of interest in spaceflight, he agreed to pursue astronaut selection. After an initial interview at the temporary NASA headquarters in the Dolley Madison House in Washington, D.C., Slayton was psychologically and physically tested at the Lovelace Clinic in Albuquerque, New Mexico, along with fellow future astronauts Scott Carpenter and Jim Lovell. On April 2, 1959, Slayton was notified of his selection as an astronaut. He moved his family from Edwards Air Force Base to a housing development near Fort Eustis, where he was neighbors with fellow Mercury Seven astronauts Gus Grissom and Wally Schirra.

After he began at NASA, Slayton was assigned to the development of the Convair Atlas LV-3B. In 1959, during a centrifuge training course, he underwent an electrocardiogram that found that he had erratic heart activity. He received further medical evaluation at Brooks Air Force Base and was diagnosed with idiopathic paroxysmal atrial fibrillation, but he was considered healthy enough to continue flying. During the uncrewed Mercury-Atlas 4 orbital spaceflight, he worked at the tracking station in Bermuda. He was selected for the second American crewed orbital mission, Mercury-Atlas 7, which he intended to name Delta 7. In early 1962, NASA Administrator James Webb opened an investigation into Slayton's atrial fibrillation. On March 15, 1962, two months prior to the launch of Delta 7, Slayton was medically disqualified from the flight and replaced on the mission by Scott Carpenter. Initially, Slayton's ineligibility was only for his assigned mission, and he attempted to improve his health by exercising more regularly and abstaining from alcohol. NASA leadership determined that Slayton was still at risk for atrial fibrillation and removed his eligibility to fly any of the remaining Mercury missions. Flight doctors recommended a cardiac catheterization to determine if he had a congenital condition, but NASA management rejected the proposal because of the risks of the operation.

=== NASA management ===
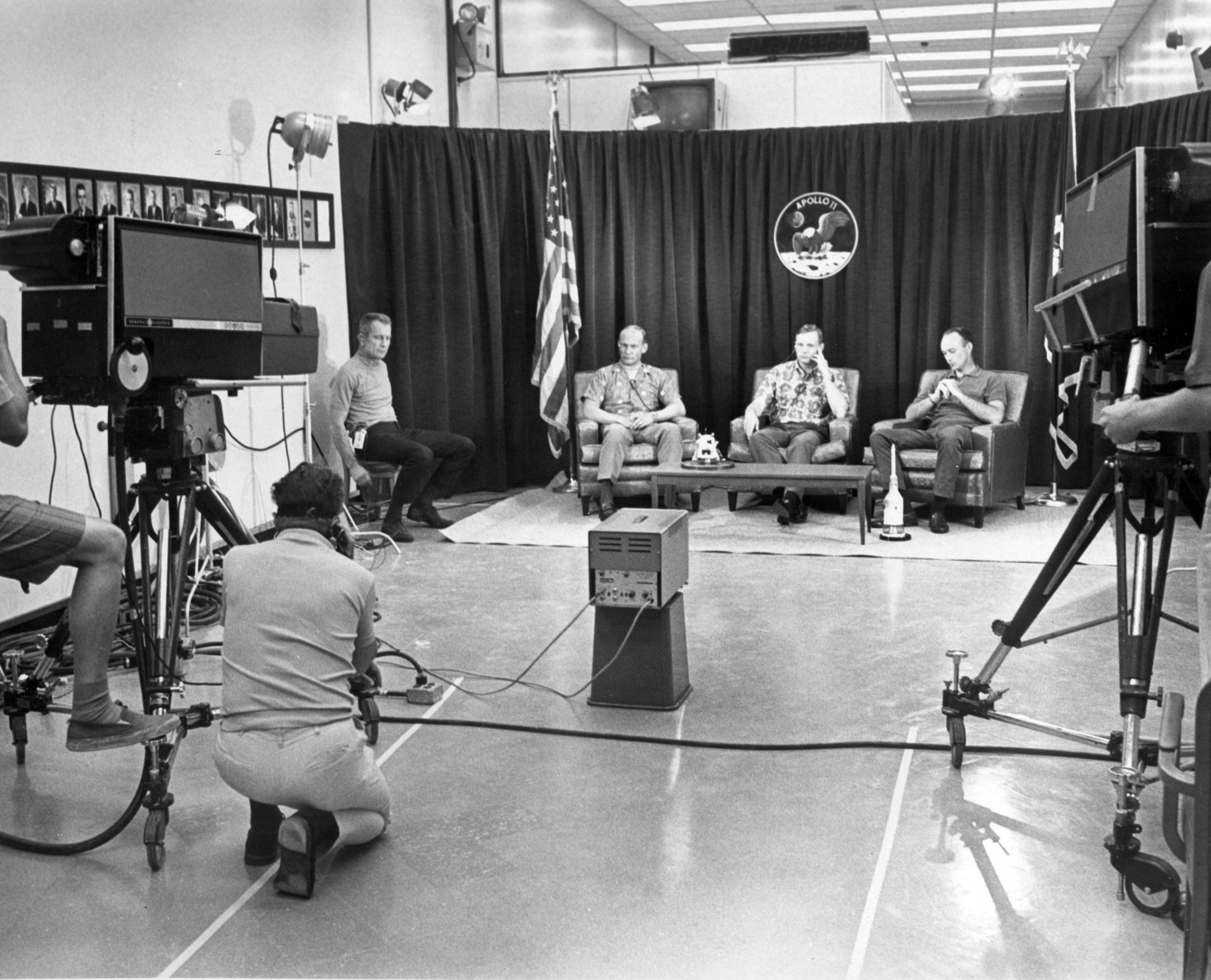
Deke Slayton (on stool at left) and the Apollo 11 crew during the last pre-flight press conference

After being grounded by NASA, Slayton was selected in early 1962 to serve as the senior manager of the astronaut office. One of his first roles was to select the Group 2 astronauts, and the new class was announced in September 1962. Additionally, he was tasked with making future crew assignments, and assigned Gordon Cooper to Mercury-Atlas 9. In an administrative restructuring in October 1963, Slayton became assistant director of Flight Crew Operations, in addition to his job managing the astronaut office. In November 1963, he resigned from his commission in the Air Force after he was permanently disqualified from flying and became a civilian executive for NASA. After Alan Shepard was grounded due to Ménière's disease, he replaced Slayton as the manager of the astronaut office, while Slayton continued to work for Flight Crew Operations and was promoted to its director in 1966. Slayton continued to be responsible for making crew assignments, and determined the astronauts that would fly on the Gemini and Apollo missions. Slayton created a crew rotation, where a crew would be selected as the backup crew for a mission and would later be the prime crew three missions later.

During the Apollo 1 fire, Slayton was in the Cape Canaveral LC-34 blockhouse. He was a close friend of fellow astronaut Gus Grissom and had considered working inside the capsule to determine communications problems and would have worked under the footrests, where the fire would later begin. After the fire, Slayton called a meeting of the astronauts from the first groups to be chosen, in April 1967 and announced that they were the candidates for the first lunar landing. Slayton oversaw the crew reassignments for the upcoming Apollo missions, as well as the selection for Group 6 and Group 7 astronauts. During this time, he continued to show symptoms of atrial fibrillation. After NASA Administrator James Webb decided that Apollo 8 would become a circumlunar mission, Slayton switched the previous crew to Apollo 9 because of their experience with the lunar module and moved both the prime and backup crew from Apollo 9 to Apollo 8. Due to his crew rotation schedule, the backup crew of Neil Armstrong, Buzz Aldrin and Michael Collins became the primary crew for Apollo 11. Slayton continued to assign the crew for the remaining lunar landings. Slayton chose to replace Ken Mattingly with Jack Swigert on Apollo 13, after concerns arose that Mattingly could develop rubella during the mission. In 1969, he made the controversial decision to assign Alan Shepard as the Apollo 13 commander, which was viewed by some astronauts as a conflict of interest, due to Shepard's previous position as head of the astronaut office. Shepard would be later reassigned to command Apollo 14, against Slayton's wishes, by the Office of Manned Spaceflight director George Mueller, who felt that Shepard needed additional training time. After the postal covers scandal during the Apollo 15 mission, Slayton reassigned the crew to non-flying jobs, effectively ending their astronaut careers. Slayton supported keeping Joe Engle as the lunar module pilot on Apollo 17, but was pressured by NASA management to replace him with Jack Schmitt, a scientist-astronaut.

=== Return to flight status ===
While grounded, Slayton took several measures to attempt to be restored to flight status, including regularly exercising, taking vitamins, quitting cigarette smoking and coffee and reducing his consumption of alcoholic beverages. In 1970 his palpitations became more frequent and he started taking experimental daily doses of quinidine, a crystalline alkaloid. This treatment was successful, but concerned that taking medication would still disqualify him from solo flying, Slayton stopped taking it against doctors orders. After a decade of seeing doctors around the world, in 1971 Slayton was examined at the Mayo Clinic after a long period without heart fibrillation, and was determined to not have a coronary condition. On March 13, 1972, NASA announced that Slayton had returned to flight status.

=== Apollo–Soyuz flight ===
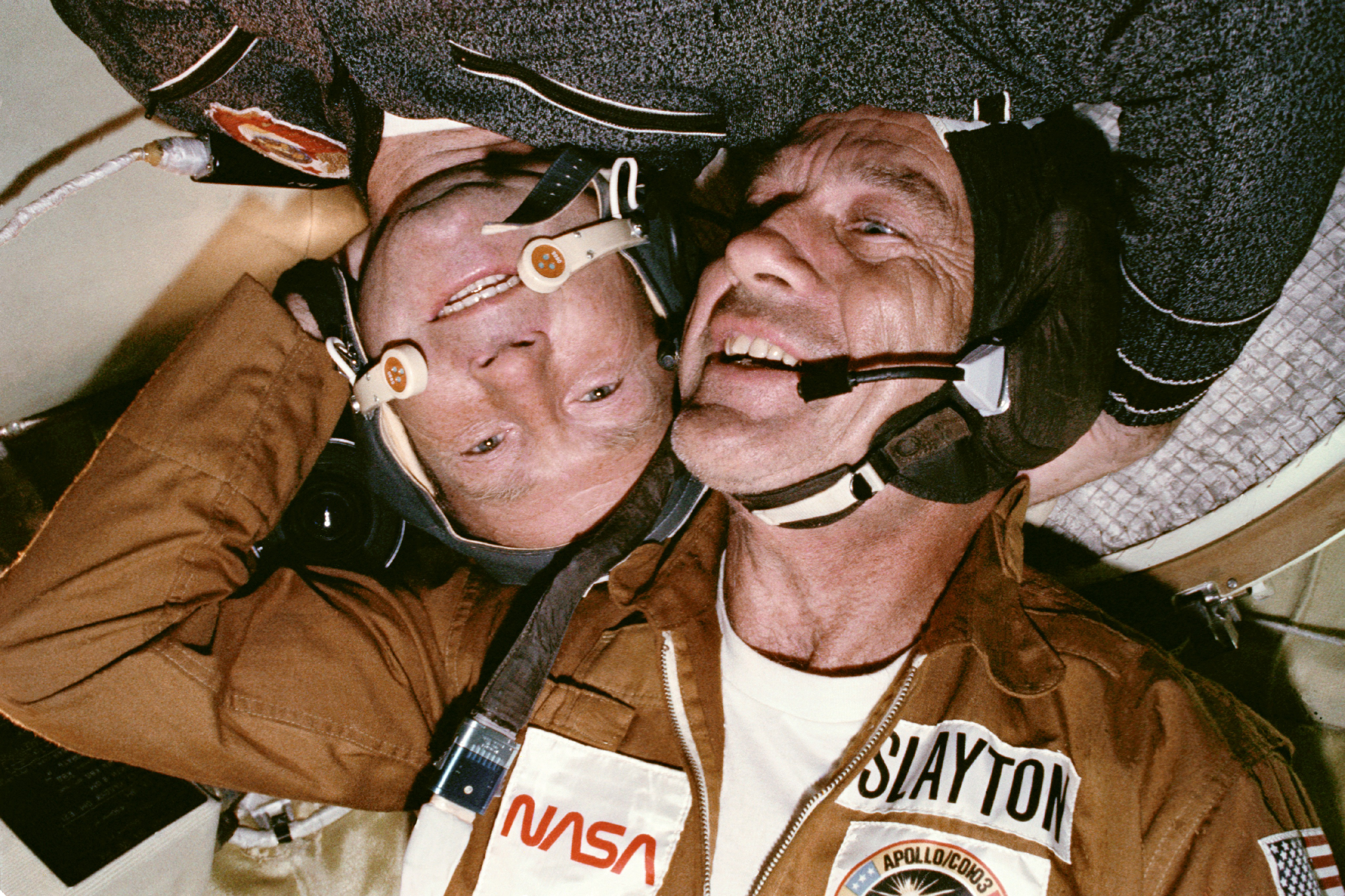
Deke Slayton (right) with cosmonaut Alexei Leonov in the Soyuz spacecraft

In February 1973, Slayton was assigned to the Apollo–Soyuz Test Project (ASTP) as a docking module pilot, along with commander Thomas Stafford and command module pilot Vance Brand. The American crew began a two-year training program, which included learning the Russian language and making trips to the Yuri Gagarin Cosmonaut Training Center in the USSR. He remained in a managerial role throughout the Skylab program, and resigned as Director of Flight Crew Operations in February 1974 in preparation for his upcoming flight.

The Apollo and Soyuz spacecraft both launched on July 15, 1975. On July 17, the two craft rendezvoused in orbit and the American astronauts conducted crew transfers with cosmonauts Alexei Leonov and Valeri Kubasov. At the end of the flight, an erroneous switch setting led to noxious nitrogen tetroxide fumes from the command module's RCS thrusters being sucked into the cabin during landing and the crew was hospitalized as a precaution in Honolulu, Hawaii, for two weeks. During hospitalization, a lesion was discovered on Slayton's lung and removed. It was determined to be benign, but he would have likely been grounded from ASTP if it had been discovered before the flight. He was 51 years old, making him the oldest astronaut to fly in space at the time.

=== Space Shuttle program ===
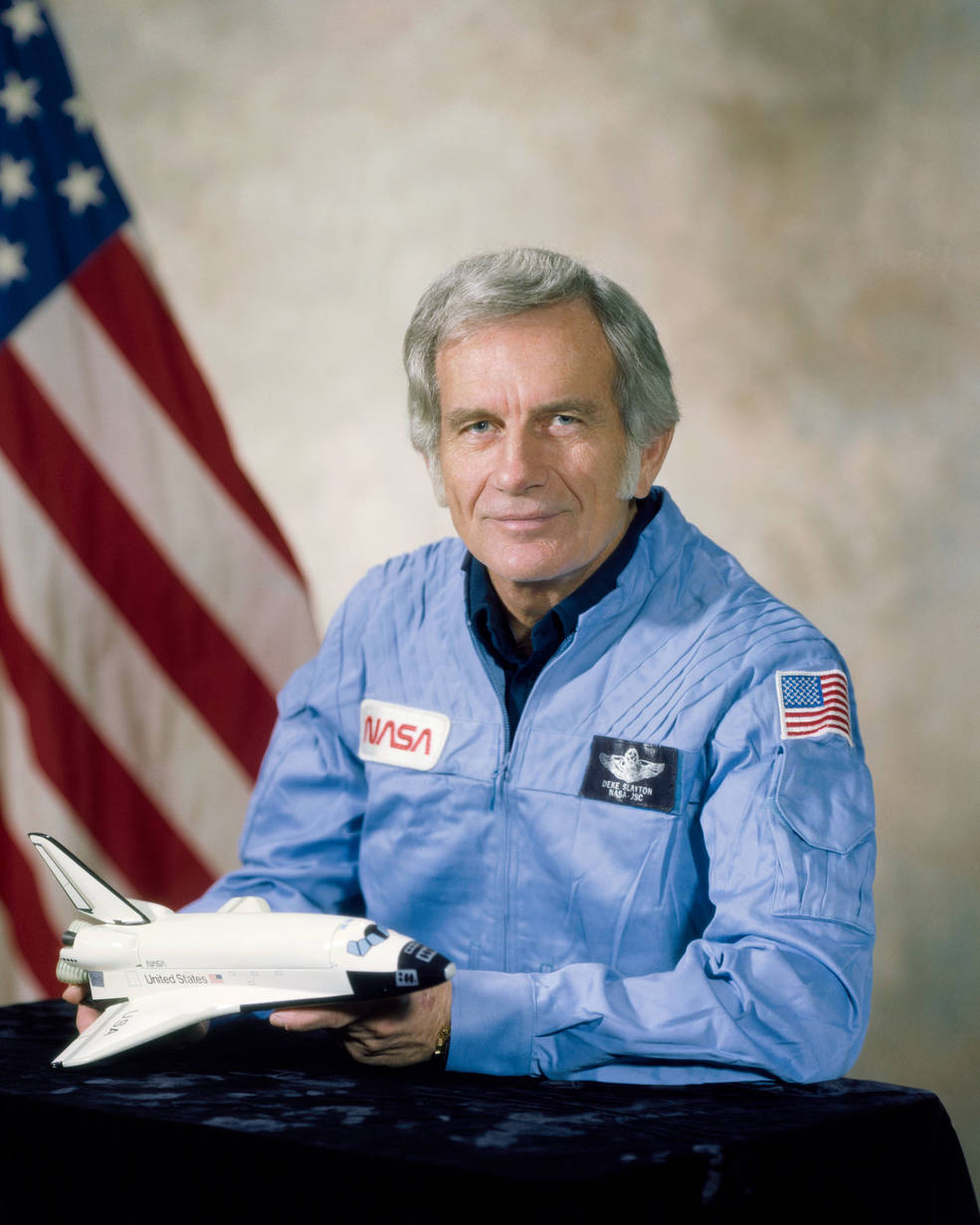
Deke Slayton in 1981

Prior to the ASTP flight, Slayton was assigned by Chris Kraft to manage the Approach and Landing Tests (ALT) of the Space Shuttle program. The ALT program developed the tests for the Space Shuttle orbiter Enterprise, and modified several F-104 Starfighters and T-38 Talons to train the astronauts. While working on the Space Shuttle, he also assisted in developing the Shuttle Carrier Aircraft.

The ALT program ended in late 1977 and Slayton agreed to manage the Space Shuttle's Orbital Flight Tests (OFT). During the selection of the Group 8 astronauts, Slayton advocated for fewer selections, with the expectation that two-man crews would fly the regular satellite deployment missions. He officially retired in 1980, but continued to serve in an advisory role for STS-1, and flew a T-38 chase plane during the landing of STS-2. He formally left NASA on February 27, 1982, and had flown 7,164 hours.

== Post-NASA career ==
After his retirement from NASA, Slayton served as president of Space Services Inc., a Houston-based company earlier founded to develop rockets for small commercial payloads. He served as mission director for a rocket called the Conestoga, which was successfully launched on September 9, 1982, and was the world's first privately funded rocket to reach space. Slayton also became interested in aviation racing, and was President of International Formula One Pylon Air Racing and Director of Columbia Astronautics. He also served on the Department of Transportation's Commercial Space Advisory Committee.

In 1991, Slayton began working with space historian Michael Cassutt to write his autobiography, titled Deke!: U.S. Manned Space from Mercury to the Shuttle, which was published in 1994, a year after his death. Slayton also co-wrote the 1994 book Moon Shot: The Inside Story of America's Race to the Moon with fellow astronaut Alan Shepard.

== Personal life ==
Slayton married Marjorie "Marge" Lunney (1921–1989) on May 18, 1955, and they had one son, Kent Sherman. They divorced in April 1978, and Slayton moved to a condominium near the Johnson Space Center. He married Bobbie Belle Jones (1945–2010), who also worked at NASA, in October 1983, and they remained married until his death.

When Slayton was a test pilot, one of his pilot colleagues was also named Don. In order to avoid confusion in radio communications, Slayton was referred to by his initials, D.K., which were eventually shortened to "Deke."

In 1992, Slayton was diagnosed with a malignant brain tumor. On June 13, 1993, he died in his home in League City, Texas, from the illness, at the age of 69. Following his death, President Bill Clinton issued a statement of condolences stating Slayton "met adversity with determination, and discouragement with a dedication to never yield his dreams" and "his commitment to space exploration helped pull the world into an era of new possibilities that grows and expands to this day." He was cremated and his ashes scattered over his family farm in Sparta, Wisconsin.

== Awards and honors ==
Slayton's military and NASA decorations:

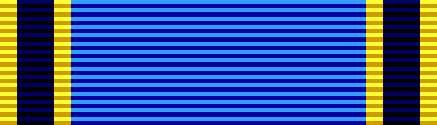

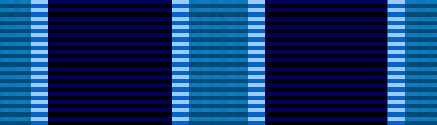

Distinguished Flying Cross		Air Medal
NASA Distinguished Service Medal with two stars	NASA Exceptional Service Medal	NASA Outstanding Leadership Medal
NASA Space Flight Medal	American Campaign Medal	European-African-Middle; Eastern Campaign Medal
Asiatic-Pacific Campaign Medal	World War II Victory Medal	National Defense Service Medal with one star

During and after his career, Slayton received numerous awards from different organizations. He received the Society of Experimental Test Pilots (SETP) James H. Doolittle Award in 1972 and the SETP Iven C. Kincheloe Award. In 1975, he received the National Institute of Social Sciences Gold Medal, the Zeta Beta Tau's Richard Gottheil Medal, and the Wright Brothers International Manned Space Flight Award. In 1976, he received the Veterans of Foreign Wars National Space Award, the American Heart Association's Heart of the Year Award, the District 35-R Lions International American of the Year Award, and the AAS Flight Achievement Award. In 1977, he received the AIAA Special Presidential Citation, the University of Minnesota's Outstanding Achievement Award, and the Houston Area Federal Business Association's Civil Servant of the Year Award. Slayton, along with Brand and Kubasov, won the FAI Yuri Gagarin Gold Medal in 1976. Additionally, he received the Collier Trophy, the Gen. Billy Mitchell Award, and the AIAA Haley Astronautics Award for 1978. Slayton received an Honorary D.Sc. from Carthage College in 1961, and an Honorary Doctorate in Engineering from Michigan Technological University in 1965.

He was a fellow of the Society of Experimental Test Pilots (SETP) and the American Astronautical Society, as well as an associate fellow of the American Institute of Aeronautics and Astronautics. He was a member of the Experimental Aircraft Association, the Space Pioneers, the Confederate Air Force, the Order of Daedalians, the National Rifle Association of America, the Veterans of Foreign Wars, and the Fraternal Order of Eagles. Additionally, he was an honorary member of the American Fighter Aces Association, the National WWII Glider Pilots Association and the Association of Space Explorers.

Deke Slayton was inducted into the U.S. Astronaut Hall of Fame on May 11, 1990, the International Space Hall of Fame in 1990, the National Aviation Hall of Fame in 1996, and the International Air & Space Hall of Fame in 2001. The Texas Oncology-Deke Slayton Cancer Center in Webster, Texas, is named in his honor. The main stretch of road in League City, Texas, FM 518, was renamed Deke Slayton Highway. The Deke Slayton Memorial Space & Bicycle Museum in Sparta, Wisconsin was named in his honor. The Slayton biographical exhibit includes his Mercury space suit, his Ambassador of Exploration Award, which showcases a lunar sample, and more. In nearby La Crosse, Wisconsin, an annual summer aircraft air show, the Deke Slayton Airfest, has been held in his honor, featuring modern and vintage military and civilian aircraft, along with NASA speakers.

Although the October 2014, Cygnus CRS Orb-3 mission named the S.S. Deke Slayton was lost when its Antares rocket exploded during launch, the Cygnus CRS Orb-4 Orbital ATK space vehicle S.S. Deke Slayton II was successfully launched to the International Space Station on an Atlas V rocket on December 6, 2015. In 2017, Solstar and NASA developed a preliminary design for Slayton Space Communicator (SC-Slayton), a commercial router on the International Space Station named in his honor. The device is intended for low Earth orbit service (LEO).

== In media ==
- 1983 film The Right Stuff – played by Scott Paulin
- 1995 film Apollo 13 – played by Chris Ellis
- 1996 TV movie Apollo 11 – played by Jack Conley
- 1998 TV miniseries From the Earth to the Moon – played by Nick Searcy
- 2009 TV movie Moonshot – played by Nigel Whitmey
- 2015 TV series The Astronaut Wives Club – played by Kenneth Mitchell
- 2016 film Hidden Figures – played by Evan Holtzman
- 2018 film First Man – played by Kyle Chandler
- 2019 TV series For All Mankind – played by Chris Bauer
- 2020 Disney+/National Geographic miniseries The Right Stuff – played by Micah Stock

== See also ==
- Apollo–Soyuz Commemorative stamp
- List of brain tumor patients

== Notes ==
Preceded by Office Created	Chief of the Astronaut Office; 1962–1963	Succeeded by Alan Shepard
