= Anna Lalor Burdick =

American educator

- Anna Lalor Burdick, from a 1939 publication
- Born: September 3, 1869; Villisca, Iowa, US
- Died: April 20, 1944
- Occupation(s): Educator, federal official

Anna Lalor Burdick (September 3, 1869 – April 20, 1944) was an Iowan educator and special agent for the U.S. Department of Education who advocated for vocational education for women. Her work is honored and continued by the Lalor Foundation and Burdick Career High School in Washington, D.C.

== Career ==
Burdick taught from school to school, but she stayed in the Des Moines area. After graduating from University of Iowa in 1889, she taught at West Des Moines High School until 1891. She became the principal of Iowa Falls High School in 1894 and kept her position for three years. In 1902, she moved on to become the superintendent of Iowa Falls and Alden Community School Districts.

On September 25, 1912, she presented "The Re-Organization of Our Educational System to Fit the Social and Industrial Needs of the Community" at the Better Iowa Schools Commission. The Commission later on described it as "one of the most attractive features" that presented "much interesting material".

In 1917, she served the U.S. Department of Education as a special agent for the Trade and Industrial Education for Girls and Women. Three years later, the Federal Board for Vocational Education published two editions of her work under the same name. She was honored for her work with a banquet in Los Angeles in 1936, and remained at the U.S. Department of Education until her retirement in 1939.

== Personal life ==
Burdick was born September 3, 1869, in Villisca, Iowa. In 1891, she married Frank Austin Burdick, but later divorced. Together, they had one son, Dr. Charles Lalor Burdick. She died in April 1944.

== Legacy ==
=== Lalor Foundation ===
Burdick's legacy is best remembered through the Lalor Foundation's Anna Lalor Burdick Program. The program isn't necessarily focused on women's vocational education, but on pro-choice reproductive health information. Their mission statement says they're dedicated to "young women who have inadequate access to information regarding reproductive health, including the subjects of contraception and pregnancy termination, and as such may be particularly lacking options in their lives".

The Lalor Foundation's website quotes her saying to young girls at a 1938 educational conference, "Your problem is not to choose between marriage and career, but rather to plan a vocation and career and still be happily married. If a girl chooses not to marry, she needs a means of self-support. If she does marry, catastrophe often changes her plans."

=== Burdick Career High School ===
Originally named the Anna Burdick Vocational High School, Burdick Career High School was built as a vocational high school for girls in Washington, D.C. It was later renamed and started to allow boys to enroll before it closed in 1996. The building still stands, but is now used for the Gladys and Benjamin Amos Campus of the Dorothy I. Height Community Academy Public Charter School.

=== University of Iowa ===
The University of Iowa honors her on campus through the Anna Lalor Burdick alcove in Shambaugh Heritage Library.
