= Space Services Inc. =

Spaces rocketry and holding company

Space Services, Inc. of America (SSIA) is a space services company and holding company. The primary subsidiary company, Celestis is for space burials; other activities include operation of an unofficial 'star registry'. Though today it buys secondary payload space on third-party commercial rockets such as Falcon 9, Taurus, and Spaceloft XL, in the 1980s the company conducted test flights of several in-house rockets.

In 1982, their Conestoga I rocket became the first privately funded rocket to reach space. In October 1995, their first (and only) attempt at an orbital launch, Conestoga 1620, failed to achieve orbit due to a guidance system failure 46 seconds into its flight. The parent company, EER Systems, subsequently folded and the Conestoga program was cancelled.

== History ==
SSIA was founded in 1980 by David Hannah.

=== Percheron development ===
The company initially started in the launch systems with a design by Gary Hudson, the Percheron, which was intended to dramatically lower the price of space launches. Key to the design was a simple pressure-fed kerosene-oxidizer engine that was intended to reduce the costs associated with "throwing away" the booster. Various loads could be accommodated by clustering the basic modules together. SSIA conducted an engine test firing of the Percheron from Matagorda Island on August 5, 1981, but the rocket exploded on the pad due to a malfunction. SSIA then parted ways with Hudson.

=== Conestoga development ===
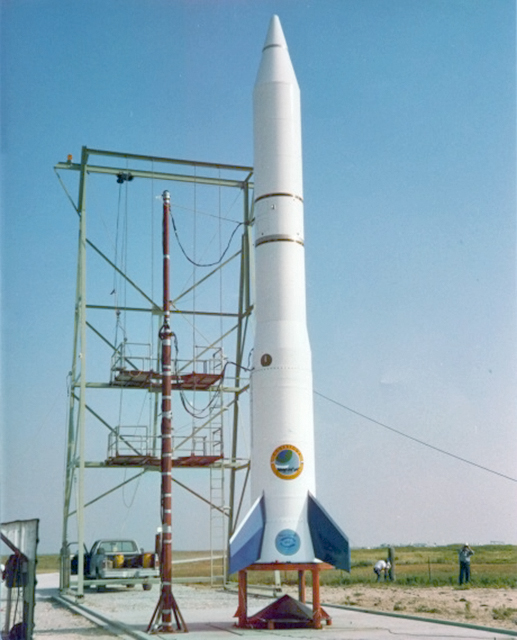
Conestoga I prepared for launch.

SSIA founder David Hannah then hired Deke Slayton, one of the original Mercury Seven astronauts. Slayton had just left NASA after running (among earlier roles) the Space Shuttle Approach and Landing validation testing. They came up with an entire new design based on clustering engines from the second stage of the Minuteman missile. The first launch of the new Conestoga I design took place on 9 Sep 1982, consisting of the core missile stage and a 500 kg dummy payload which included 40 gallons of water. The payload was successfully ejected at 313 km, and the Conestoga I became the first privately funded rocket to reach space.

SSIA was purchased by EER Systems in December 1990. The design was modified again, this time using the Castor engines originally used on the Scout, a workhorse of the 1960s. The new design was known as the Conestoga 1620, or by other numbers depending on the number and arrangement of the boosters.

The first orbital launch of Conestoga 1620 was to carry a NASA payload, the first flight of the Commercial Experiment Transporter (COMET) payload concept. On 23 October 1995 the COMET (now known as METEOR) and Conestoga 1620 was finally ready for launch. The launch took place from the NASA Wallops Flight Facility; the rocket launched normally, but broke up by ground command after a guidance system failure 46 seconds after launch. The failure was later determined to be due to loss of hydraulic fluid due to excessive use of the control thrusters responding to noise in the flight control system.

EER Systems was purchased by L-3 Communications in 2001 for $110 million.

== See also ==
- NewSpace
