= Howard Burdick =

American World War I flying ace

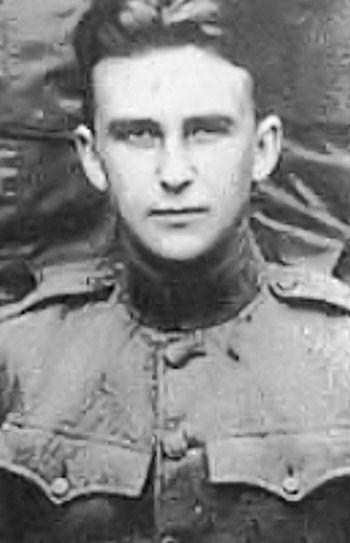
- Howard Burdick, 1918
- Born: December 12, 1891; Brooklyn, New York, USA
- Died: January 20, 1975 (aged 83); Los Angeles, California, USA
- Relatives: Clinton D. Burdick (son)
- Military career
- Allegiance: United States
- Branch: Air Service, United States Army
- Service years: 1917 - 1919
- Rank: First Lieutenant
- Unit: Air Service, United States Army: 17th Aero Squadron
- Conflicts: World War I
- Awards: Distinguished Service Cross, British Distinguished Flying Cross

Lieutenant Howard Burdick (12 December 1891—20 January 1975) DSC DFC was an American World War I flying ace credited with eight confirmed aerial victories. He and his son, Clinton D. Burdick, are the only known pair of father-son flying aces.

== Biography ==
Born in Brooklyn, New York, Howard Burdick joined the Air Service, United States Army in 1917 and was deployed to France. He was assigned to the 17th Aero Squadron, and flew British Sopwith Camels while attached to the Royal Air Force. For his actions in combat, he was awarded the Distinguished Flying Cross for eight aerial victories, often flying in company with George Vaughn, his flight commander.

Burdick forced down an enemy Fokker biplane with Vaughn on 14 October 1918. Burdick was excited with worry about the fate of his friend Howard Knotts, who had fallen behind enemy lines, and took his revenge on the downed German, shooting him to death on the ground.

Eventually settling in California, Burdick died in Los Angeles in January 1975.

== Aerial victory list ==
Howard Burdick achieved all his victories while flying a Sopwith Camel for the 17th Aero Squadron.

No.	Date/time	Foe	Result	Location	Notes
1	18 September 1918 @ 1100 hours	LVG reconnaissance craft	Destroyed	Rumilly	
2	24 September 1918 @ 1040 hours	Fokker D.VII fighter	Destroyed	Northwest of Havrincourt	
3	28 September 1918 @ 1745 hours	LVG reconnaissance craft	Destroyed		
4	28 September 1918 @ 1810 hours	Fokker D.VII fighter	Destroyed	Cambrai	
5	2 October 1918 @ 0910 hours	DFW reconnaissance craft	Destroyed	East of Awoignt	Victory shared with George Vaughn
6	14 October 1918 @ 0710 hours	Halberstadt reconnaissance craft	Destroyed	East of Bazeul	Victory shared with George Vaughn and another pilot
7	14 October 1918 @ 1400 hours	Fokker D.VII fighter	Destroyed	Northeast of Hausey	Victory shared with George Vaughn
8	25 October 1918 @ 1055 hours	Fokker D.VII fighter	Set afire and destroyed	Mormal Woods	

== Honors and awards ==
=== Distinguished Service Cross ===
The Distinguished Service Cross is presented to Howard Burdick, Second Lieutenant (Air Service), U.S. Army, for extraordinary heroism in action northwest of Cambrai, France, September 28, 1918. Attacked by two Fokker biplanes, Lieutenant Burdick outmaneuvered both machines, shot one into flames and routed the other one. Later, seeing three Fokkers attacking an American aviator, he at once dove into the combat to his assistance, shooting down one and driving off the other two. His quick and unhesitating attack, single-handed, on the three Fokkers save the life of his fellow pilot. General Orders No. 38, W.D., 1921

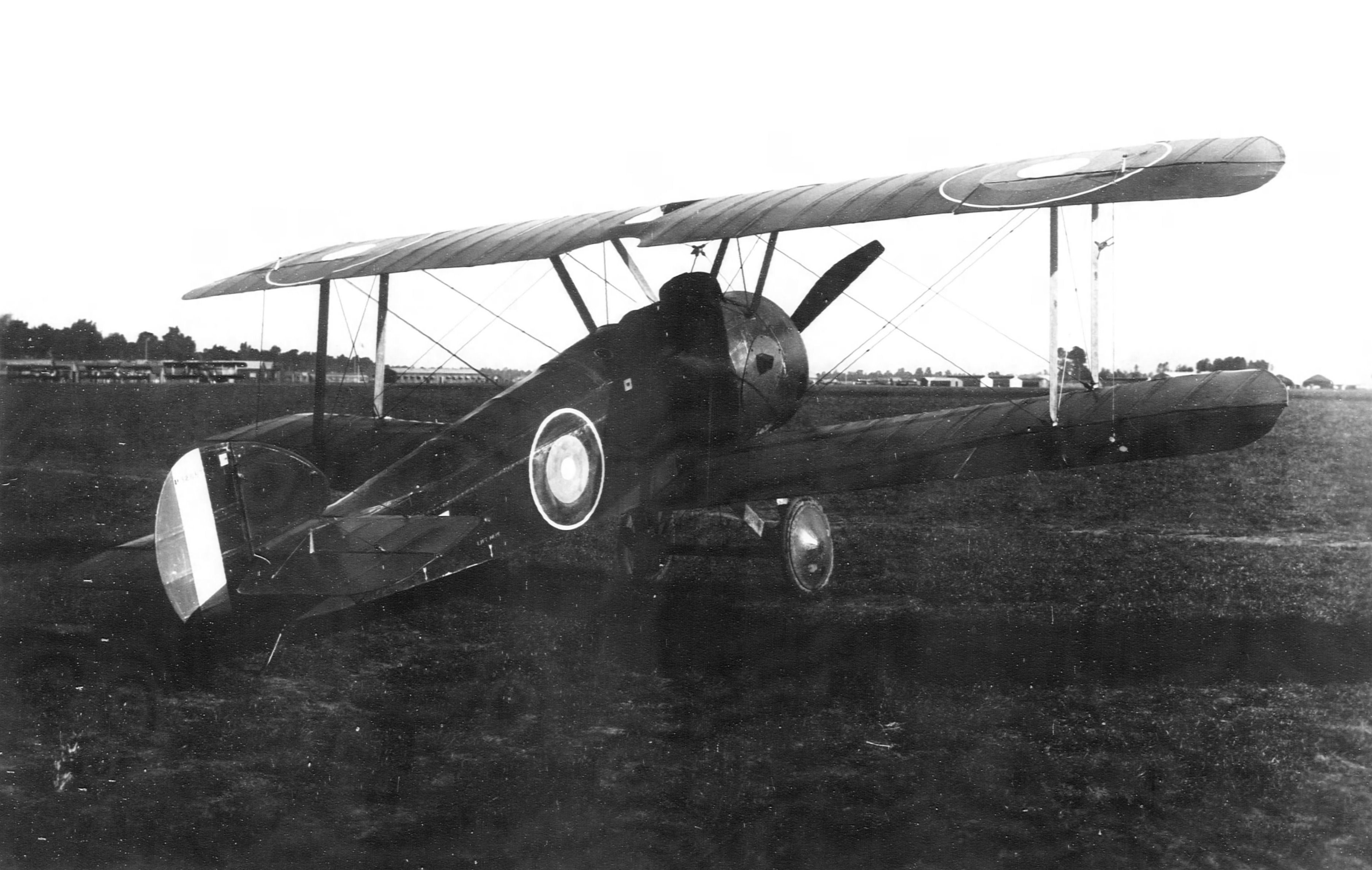
USAS Sopwith Camel.

=== Distinguished Flying Cross ===
Burdick received the Distinguished Flying Cross for skill and gallantry. He was noted for his successful shooting down of an enemy aircraft over the Forest of Mormal on October 25, 1918, as well as for the destruction of four additional aircraft earlier in his service.

== See also ==
- List of World War I flying aces from the United States

== Bibliography ==
- Over the Front: A Complete Record of the Fighter Aces and Units of the United States and French Air Services, 1914-1918 (1992). Norman L. R. Franks, Frank W. Bailey. Grub Street. ISBN 0-948817-54-2, ISBN 978-0-948817-54-0.
- American Aces of World War I. Norman Franks, Harry Dempsey. Osprey Publishing, 2001. ISBN 1-84176-375-6, ISBN 978-1-84176-375-0.
