= Aries (rocket) =

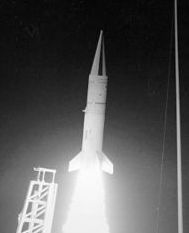
- Launch of an Aries Target Test Vehicle in 1991
- Function: Sounding rocket; target vehicle
- Manufacturer: Space Vector Corporation; Orbital Sciences Corporation
- Country of origin: United States

Size
- Height: 10.62 m (34.8 ft)
- Diameter: 1.13 m (3 ft 8 in)
- Mass: 7,150 kg (15,760 lb)
- Stages: One

Payload to 320 km (200 mi)
- Mass: 820 kg (1,810 lb)

Associated rockets
- Based on: LGM-30 Minuteman

Launch history
- Status: Operational
- Launch sites: Multiple
- First flight: 17 October 1973

First stage – Minuteman I
- Diameter: 1.13 m (3 ft 8 in)
- Powered by: 1 x Aerojet M56
- Maximum thrust: 207 kN (47,000 lb_{f})
- Burn time: 62 s
- Propellant: solid

Aries (Previously designated: “Fat Albert”) is an American sounding rocket and target rocket, developed by Space Vector Corporation from retired LGM-30 Minuteman I intercontinental ballistic missile (ICBM) stages for use by the United States Air Force and NASA. Taken over by Orbital Sciences Corporation, Aries, as the Target Test Vehicle, remains in use.

== Design and development ==
In the late 1960s, the retirement of the LGM-30 Minuteman I ICBM resulted in the opportunity to produce a high-performance sounding rocket from the surplus solid-propellant rockets that became available; the Naval Research Laboratory awarded a contract to Space Vector Corporation in 1971 to develop the "Fat Albert" rocket using the surplus Minuteman I first stages; before the first launch, the name of the rocket was changed to the "more dignified" Aries.

Aries consisted of an Aerojet M56, the second stage of the Minuteman I, fueled by 4,704 kg (10,371 lb) ammonium perchlorate/aluminum/ polyurethane solid rocket fuel with a maximum thrust of 207 kN (47,000 lb_{f}) for a burn time of 63 seconds ending at about 50 km (31 mi) in altitude, leaving the Aries with an 739 kg (1,629 lb) “impact” empty mass. The Aries was also fitted with an aerodynamic nose cone and four tail fins, taken from the RIM-8 Talos surface-to-air missile, for stabilization. Steering was by gimbaled thrust via four gimbaled nozzles; Aries retained its guidance system, redesigned for use as a sounding rocket, allowing for more precise flight paths and use of smaller rocket ranges than other sounding rockets required; however, its size meant it required a more substantial launch platform than conventional sounding rockets. Payloads of 907 kg (2,000 lb) could be lifted to apogees of up to 500 km (310 mi) by Aries; the maximum payload capable of being carried was 1,770 kg (3,900 lb) to an altitude of 225 km (140 mi), and an apogee of 512 km (318 mi) was achieved on one flight.

== Operational history ==
The first launch of Aries, carrying a dummy payload, took place on 17 October 1973; following the first two test launches, the Talos stabilizing fins were replaced by a fins of a new design, and the skirt surrounding the rocket engine nozzles was modified. Aries entered operational service, being used on over 20 flights to launch payloads such as X-ray telescopes and ultraviolet telescopes that were too heavy to be lifted by conventional sounding rockets. Payloads could be recovered using a two-stage parachute system.

In addition to its use as a sounding rocket, Aries was adapted for use as a target rocket to be used in the testing of anti-ballistic missiles. Contracted with Orbital Sciences Corporation for production in this role and designated the Target Test Vehicle (TTV), as of 2004, over 50 target launches had taken place, primarily testing the United States Navy's RIM-156 SM-2 Extended Range and RIM-161 Standard Missile 3 missiles; the missile remains in service.
