= Burdak =

Burdak is a surname mainly found in north-west Rajasthan.

Notable people with the surname include:

- Harji Ram Burdak (1931–2013), Indian politician
- Narayan Singh Burdak, Indian politician
- Virendra Singh, Indian politician
