= Matagorda Island =

Island in Texas, U.S.

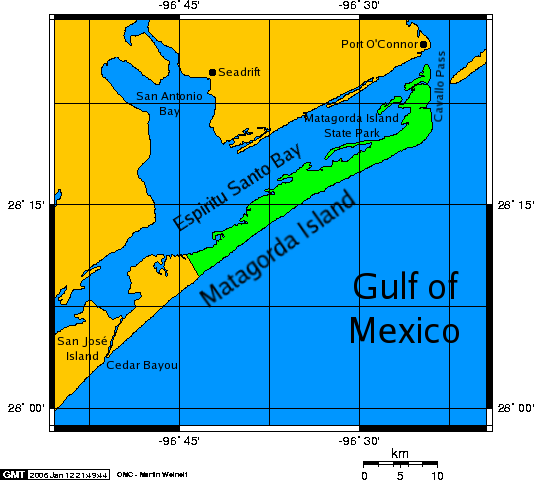
- Matagorda Island and San Antonio Bay

- Location within Texas Location within the United States

Geography
- Location: Gulf of Mexico
- Coordinates: 28°13′38″N 96°38′25″W
- Archipelago: Texas barrier islands
- Area: 60.7 sq mi (157 km^{2})
- Length: 38 mi (61 km)

Administration
- United States
- State: Texas
- County: Calhoun County

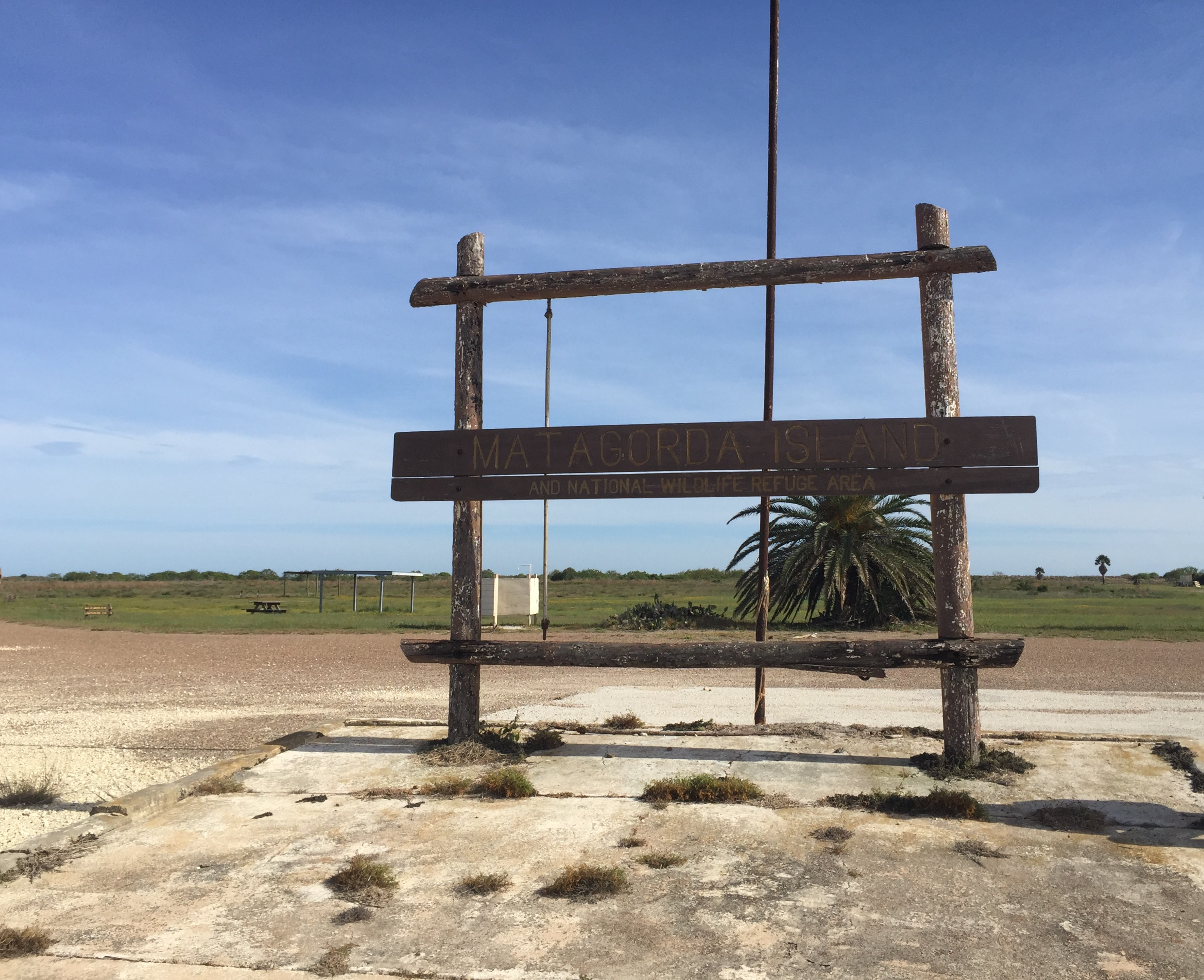
Matagorda Island sign

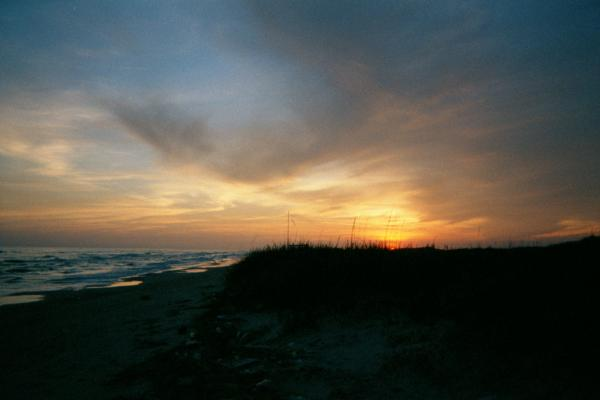
Sunset on Matagorda Island, Texas.

Matagorda Island (/ˌmætəˈɡɔːrdə/), Spanish for "thick bush," is a 38-mile (61 km) long barrier island on the Texas Gulf coast, located approximately seven miles (11 kilometers) south of Port O'Connor, in the southernmost part of Calhoun County. The traditional homeland of the Karankawa people, the island is oriented generally northeast-southwest, with the Gulf of Mexico on the east and south, and Espiritu Santo Bay on the west and north. It is separated from San José Island to the south by Cedar Bayou, and is separated from the Matagorda Peninsula to the north by Pass Cavallo. It is accessible by boat only. It has a land area of 60.7 square miles (157 square kilometers).

Matagorda Island is devoted to wildlife refuges managed by the Texas Parks and Wildlife Department and the United States Fish and Wildlife Service and is known as Matagorda Island National Wildlife Refuge and State Natural Area.

The land that is now Matagorda Island State Park was acquired in 1940 by condemnation from the Hawes, Hill, and Little families (but not the Wynne-Murchison interests) for use as a temporary training facility for the World War II era.

Matagorda Island State Park was featured as a "survival location" by the main characters in the book Day by Day Armageddon by J.L. Bourne. The island is also featured as a principal location in the book Powersat by Ben Bova. Life on the island in the late 1800s is described in the book A Texas cowboy, or, Fifteen years on the hurricane deck of a Spanish pony by Charles A. Siringo.

== Climate ==
The climate in this area is characterized by hot, humid summers and generally mild to cool winters. According to the Köppen Climate Classification system, Matagorda Island has a humid subtropical climate, abbreviated "Cfa" on climate maps.

== See also ==
- Matagorda Island Air Force Base
- Matagorda Island Light
- Matagorda Peninsula Army Airfield
