= 1982 in spaceflight =

National firsts
- Space traveller: France

Rockets
- Maiden flights: Long March 2C; Soyuz-U2; Titan 34D
- Retirements: N-I; Titan IIIC; Titan IIID

Crewed flights
- Orbital: 6
- Total travellers: 16

1982 in spaceflight

The following is an outline of 1982 in spaceflight.

== Launches ==
- ← Jan
- Feb
- Mar
- Apr
- May
- Jun
- Jul
- Aug
- Sep
- Oct
- Nov
- Dec →

Date and time (UTC)	Rocket	Flight number	Launch site		LSP	
Date and time (UTC)	Payload	Operator	Orbit	Function	Decay (UTC)	Outcome
Date and time (UTC)	Remarks					
=== January ===
7 January; 15:38	(Soviet Union) Kosmos-3M		(Soviet Union) Plesetsk Site 132/2		(Soviet Union)	
7 January; 15:38	(Soviet Union) Kosmos 1331 (Strela-2M #26)		Low Earth	Communications	In orbit	Successful
12 January; 12:30	(Soviet Union) Soyuz-U		(Soviet Union) Plesetsk Site 41/1		(Soviet Union)	
12 January; 12:30	(Soviet Union) Kosmos 1332 (Zenit-4MT/Orion #22)	GRU	Low Earth	Reconnaissance	25 January	Successful
14 January; 07:51	(Soviet Union) Kosmos-3M		(Soviet Union) Plesetsk Site 132/2		(Soviet Union)	
14 January; 07:51	(Soviet Union) Kosmos 1333 (Parus #30)		Low Earth	Communications; Navigation	In orbit	Successful
16 January; 01:54	(United States) Delta 3910/PAM-D	D-159	(United States) Cape Canaveral LC-17A		(United States)	
16 January; 01:54	(United States) Satcom 4	RCA Americom	Geostationary	Communications	In orbit	Successful
20 January; 11:30	(Soviet Union) Soyuz-U		(Soviet Union) Plesetsk Site 16/2		(Soviet Union)	
20 January; 11:30	(Soviet Union) Kosmos 1334 (Zenit-6U/Argon #52)	GRU	Low Earth	Reconnaissance	3 February	Successful
21 January; 19:30	(United States) Titan III(24)B		(United States) Vandenberg SLC-4W		(United States)	
21 January; 19:30	(United States) OPS 2849 (KH-8 52)	NRO	Sun-synchronous	Reconnaissance	23 May	Successful
29 January; 11:00	(Soviet Union) Kosmos-3M		(Soviet Union) Plesetsk Site 132/2		(Soviet Union)	
29 January; 11:00	(Soviet Union) Kosmos 1335 (Taifun-2 #10)		Low Earth	Radar calibration	5 April 1987	Successful
30 January; 11:30	(Soviet Union) Soyuz-U		(Soviet Union) Baikonur Site 31/6		(Soviet Union)	
30 January; 11:30	(Soviet Union) Kosmos 1336 (Yantar-2K/Feniks #24)	GRU		Reconnaissance	26 February	Successful
=== February ===
5 February; 09:12	(Soviet Union) Proton-K/Blok DM		(Soviet Union) Baikonur Site 200/40		(Soviet Union)	
5 February; 09:12	(Soviet Union) Ekran 8 (Ekran 22L)		Geostationary	Communications	In orbit	Successful
11 February; 01:11	(Soviet Union) Tsyklon-2		(Soviet Union) Baikonur Site 90		(Soviet Union)	
11 February; 01:11	(Soviet Union) Kosmos 1337 (US-P #13)		Low Earth	ELINT ocean surveillance	25 July	Spacecraft failure
11 February; 01:11	Satellite propulsion or avionics system failed					
16 February; 11:10	(Soviet Union) Soyuz-U		(Soviet Union) Plesetsk Site 41/1		(Soviet Union)	
16 February; 11:10	(Soviet Union) Kosmos 1338 (Zenit-6U/Argon #53)	GRU	Low Earth	Reconnaissance	2 March	Successful
17 February; 21:56	(Soviet Union) Kosmos-3M		(Soviet Union) Plesetsk Site 132/2		(Soviet Union)	
17 February; 21:56	(Soviet Union) Kosmos 1339 (Tsikada #9)		Low Earth	Navigation	In orbit	Successful
19 February; 01:42	(Soviet Union) Vostok-2M		(Soviet Union) Plesetsk Site 16/2		(Soviet Union)	
19 February; 01:42	(Soviet Union) Kosmos 1340 (Tselina-D #33)		Low Earth	ELINT	In orbit	Successful
26 February; 00:04:44	(United States) Delta 3910/PAM-D	D-160	(United States) Cape Canaveral LC-17A		(United States)	
26 February; 00:04:44	(United States) Westar 4	Western Union	Geostationary	Communications	In orbit	Successful
26 February; 20:10	(Soviet Union) Molniya-M/Blok ML		(Soviet Union) Plesetsk Site 41/1		(Soviet Union)	
26 February; 20:10	(Soviet Union) Molniya-1K 53 (Molniya-1K 58L)		Molniya orbit	Communications	In orbit	Successful
=== March ===
3 March; 05:44	(Soviet Union) Molniya-M/Blok 2BL		(Soviet Union) Plesetsk Site 16/2		(Soviet Union)	
3 March; 05:44	(Soviet Union) Kosmos 1341 (US-K #24)		Molniya	Missile early warning	In orbit	Successful
4 March	(Soviet Union) Kosmos-3M		(Soviet Union) Kapustin Yar Site 107/1		(Soviet Union)	
4 March	(Soviet Union) Taifun-2 #11		Intended: Low Earth	Radar calibration	4 March	Launch failure
5 March; 00:23	(United States) Atlas SLV-3D Centaur-D1AR	AC-58	(United States) Cape Canaveral LC-36A		(United States)	
5 March; 00:23	(United Nations) Intelsat VD F-4	Intelsat	Geosynchronous	Communications	In orbit	Successful
5 March; 10:50	(Soviet Union) Soyuz-U		(Soviet Union) Plesetsk Site 41/1		(Soviet Union)	
5 March; 10:50	(Soviet Union) Kosmos 1342 (Zenit-6U/Argon #54)	GRU	Low Earth	Reconnaissance	19 March	Successful
6 March; 19:25	(United States) Titan III(23)C		(United States) Cape Canaveral LC-40		(United States)	
6 March; 19:25	(United States) OPS 8701 (DSP-10)	US Air Force	Geosynchronous	Early warning	In orbit	Successful
6 March; 19:25	Final flight of Titan IIIC					
15 March; 04:39	(Soviet Union) Proton-K/Blok DM		(Soviet Union) Baikonur Site 200/39		(Soviet Union)	
15 March; 04:39	(Soviet Union) Gorizont 5 (Gorizont 14L)		Geostationary	Communications	In orbit	Successful
17 March; 10:30	(Soviet Union) Soyuz-U		(Soviet Union) Plesetsk Site 41/1		(Soviet Union)	
17 March; 10:30	(Soviet Union) Kosmos 1343 (Zenit-6U/Argon #55)	GRU	Low Earth	Reconnaissance	31 March	Successful
22 March; 16:00	(United States) Space Shuttle Columbia		(United States) Kennedy LC-39A		(United States) United Space Alliance	
22 March; 16:00	(United States) STS-3	NASA	Low Earth	Development test flight	30 March; 16:05	Successful
22 March; 16:00	(United States) Development Flight Instrumentation	NASA	Low Earth (Columbia)	Monitor orbiter performance	30 March; 16:05	Successful
22 March; 16:00	(United States) OSTA-1	NASA	Low Earth (Columbia)	Remote sensing	30 March; 16:05	Successful
22 March; 16:00	Crewed orbital flight with two astronauts Only Shuttle flight to land at White Sands Space Harbor; Shuttle Imaging Radar-A (SIR-1)					
24 March; 00:12	(Soviet Union) Molniya-M/Blok ML		(Soviet Union) Plesetsk Site 41/1		(Soviet Union)	
24 March; 00:12	(Soviet Union) Molniya-3 18 (Molniya-3 29L)		Molniya	Communications	23 June 1992	Successful
24 March; 19:47	(Soviet Union) Kosmos-3M		(Soviet Union) Plesetsk Site 132/1		(Soviet Union)	
24 March; 19:47	(Soviet Union) Kosmos 1344 (Parus #31)		Low Earth	Communications; Navigation	In orbit	Successful
25 March; 09:50	(Soviet Union) Tsyklon-3		(Soviet Union) Plesetsk Site 32/1		(Soviet Union)	
25 March; 09:50	(Soviet Union) Meteor-2 No.8		Low Earth	Weather	In orbit	Successful
31 March; 09:00	(Soviet Union) Kosmos-3M		(Soviet Union) Plesetsk Site 132/2		(Soviet Union)	
31 March; 09:00	(Soviet Union) Kosmos 1345 (Tselina-O #41)		Low Earth	ELINT	27 September 1989	Successful
31 March; 16:27	(Soviet Union) Vostok-2M		(Soviet Union) Plesetsk Site 16/2		(Soviet Union)	
31 March; 16:27	(Soviet Union) Kosmos 1346 (Tselina-D #34)		Low Earth	ELINT	17 December 2017	Successful
=== April ===
2 April; 10:15	(Soviet Union) Soyuz-U		(Soviet Union) Baikonur Site 31/6		(Soviet Union)	
2 April; 10:15	(Soviet Union) Kosmos 1347 (Yantar-4K2/Kobalt #2)	GRU	Low Earth	Reconnaissance	21 May	Successful
7 April; 13:41	(Soviet Union) Molniya-M/Blok 2BL		(Soviet Union) Plesetsk Site 16/2		(Soviet Union)	
7 April; 13:41	(Soviet Union) Kosmos 1348 (US-K #25)		Molniya	Early warning	In orbit	Successful
8 April; 00:15	(Soviet Union) Kosmos-3M		(Soviet Union) Plesetsk Site 132/2		(Soviet Union)	
8 April; 00:15	(Soviet Union) Kosmos 1349 (Parus #32)		Low Earth	Communication; Navigation	In orbit	Successful
10 April; 06:47	(United States) Delta 3910/PAM-D	D-161	(United States) Cape Canaveral LC-17A		(United States)	
10 April; 06:47	(India) INSAT-1A	ISRO	Geostationary	Communications	In orbit	Spacecraft failure
10 April; 06:47	Attitude control system malfunction, ceased operations in September 1982					
15 April; 14:30	(Soviet Union) Soyuz-U		(Soviet Union) Plesetsk Site 41/1		(Soviet Union)	
15 April; 14:30	(Soviet Union) Kosmos 1350 (Yantar-2K/Feniks #25)	GRU	Low Earth	Reconnaissance	16 May	Successful
19 April; 19:45:00	(Soviet Union) Proton-K		(Soviet Union) Baikonur Site 200/40		(Soviet Union)	
19 April; 19:45:00	(Soviet Union) Salyut 7 (DOS-6)		Low Earth	Space station	7 February 1991	Successful
19 April; 19:45:00	(Soviet Union) Iskra 2 (RK 02)	MAI	Low Earth	Amateur radio	9 July	Successful
19 April; 19:45:00	Final space station launched as part of the Salyut programme. Iskra 2 was launched inside Salyut 7 and deployed on 17 May through an airlock					
21 April; 01:40	(Soviet Union) Kosmos-3M		(Soviet Union) Kapustin Yar Site 107/1		(Soviet Union)	
21 April; 01:40	(Soviet Union) Kosmos 1351 (Taifun-2 #12)		Low Earth	Radar calibration	14 March 1983	Successful
21 April; 09:15	(Soviet Union) Soyuz-U		(Soviet Union) Baikonur Site 31/6		(Soviet Union)	
21 April; 09:15	(Soviet Union) Kosmos 1352 (Zenit-6U/Argon #56)	GRU	Low Earth	Reconnaissance	5 May	Successful
23 April; 09:40	(Soviet Union) Soyuz-U		(Soviet Union) Pleetsk Site 41/1		(Soviet Union)	
23 April; 09:40	(Soviet Union) Kosmos 1353 (Zenit-4MKT/Fram #20)	GRU	Low Earth	Reconnaissance	6 May	Successful
28 April; 02:52	(Soviet Union) Kosmos-3M		(Soviet Union) Plesetsk Site 132/1		(Soviet Union)	
28 April; 02:52	(Soviet Union) Kosmos 1354 (Strela-2M #27)		Low Earth	Communications	In orbit	Successful
29 April; 09:55	(Soviet Union) Tsyklon-2		(Soviet Union) Baikonur Site 90/20		(Soviet Union)	
29 April; 09:55	(Soviet Union) Kosmos 1355 (US-P #14)		Low Earth	ELINT ocean surveillance	7 March 1984	Successful
=== May ===
5 May; 08:01	(Soviet Union) Vostok-2M		(Soviet Union) Plesetsk Site 16/2		(Soviet Union)	
5 May; 08:01	(Soviet Union) Kosmos 1356 (Tselina-D No.35)		Low Earth	Communication; Navigation	8 July 2023	Successful
6 May; 18:07	(Soviet Union) Kosmos-3M		(Soviet Union) Plesetsk Site 132/2		(Soviet Union)	
6 May; 18:07	(Soviet Union) Kosmos 1357 (Strela-1M #233)		Low Earth	Communications	In orbit	Successful
6 May; 18:07	(Soviet Union) Kosmos 1358 (Strela-1M #234)		Low Earth	Communications	In orbit	Successful
6 May; 18:07	(Soviet Union) Kosmos 1359 (Strela-1M #235)		Low Earth	Communications	In orbit	Successful
6 May; 18:07	(Soviet Union) Kosmos 1360 (Strela-1M #236)		Low Earth	Communications	In orbit	Successful
6 May; 18:07	(Soviet Union) Kosmos 1361 (Strela-1M #237)		Low Earth	Communications	In orbit	Successful
6 May; 18:07	(Soviet Union) Kosmos 1362 (Strela-1M #238)		Low Earth	Communications	In orbit	Successful
6 May; 18:07	(Soviet Union) Kosmos 1363 (Strela-1M #239)		Low Earth	Communications	In orbit	Successful
6 May; 18:07	(Soviet Union) Kosmos 1364 (Strela-1M #240)		Low Earth	Communications	In orbit	Successful
11 May; 18:35	(United States) Titan III(23)D		(United States) Vandenberg SLC-4E		(United States)	
11 May; 18:35	(United States) OPS 5642 (KH-9-17)	NRO	Sun-synchronous	Reconnaissance	5 December	Successful
11 May; 18:35	(United States) OPS 6553 (SSF-D)	NRO	Sun-synchronous	ELINT	In orbit	Successful
13 May; 09:58	(Soviet Union) Soyuz-U		(Soviet Union) Baikonur Site 1/5		(Soviet Union)	
13 May; 09:58	(Soviet Union) Soyuz T-5		Low Earth (Salyut 7)	Salyut 7 EO-1	27 August; 15:04	Successful
13 May; 09:58	Crewed orbital flight with two cosmonauts, first mission to Salyut 7					
14 May; 19:39	(Soviet Union) Tsyklon-2		(Soviet Union) Baikonur Site 90/20		(Soviet Union)	
14 May; 19:39	(Soviet Union) Kosmos 1365 (US-A #20)		Low Earth	Radar ocean surveillance	19 October	Successful
15 May; 14:20	(Soviet Union) Soyuz-U		(Soviet Union) Plesetsk Site 41/1		(Soviet Union)	
15 May; 14:20	(Soviet Union) Zenit-6U/Argon #57	GRU	Intended: Low Earth	Reconnaissance	15 May	Failure
17 May; 23:50	(Soviet Union) Proton-K/Blok DM		(Soviet Union) Baikonur Site 200/39		(Soviet Union)	
17 May; 23:50	(Soviet Union) Kosmos 1366 (Potok #1, Geizer 11L)		Geostationary	Data relay	In orbit	Successful
20 May; 13:08	(Soviet Union) Molniya-M/Blok 2BL		(Soviet Union) Plesetsk Site 41/1		(Soviet Union)	
20 May; 13:08	(Soviet Union) Kosmos 1367 (US-K #26)		Molniya	Early warning	In orbit	Successful
21 May; 12:40	(Soviet Union) Soyuz-U		(Soviet Union) Baikonur Site 31/6		(Soviet Union)	
21 May; 12:40	(Soviet Union) Kosmos 1368 (Zenit-6U/Argon #58)	GRU	Low Earth	Reconnaissance	3 June	Successful
23 May; 05:58	(Soviet Union) Soyuz-U		(Soviet Union) Baikonur Site 1/5		(Soviet Union)	
23 May; 05:58	(Soviet Union) Progress 13		Low Earth (Salyut 7)	Logistics	6 June; 00:05	Successful
25 May; 09:00	(Soviet Union) Soyuz-U		(Soviet Union) Plesetsk Site 43/3		(Soviet Union)	
25 May; 09:00	(Soviet Union) Kosmos 1369 (Resurs-F1 (17F41) #7)		Low Earth	Earth observation	8 June	Successful
28 May; 09:10	(Soviet Union) Soyuz-U		(Soviet Union) Baikonur Site 31/6		(Soviet Union)	
28 May; 09:10	(Soviet Union) Kosmos 1370 (Yantar-1KFT/Kometa #2)		Low Earth	Cartography	11 July	Successful
28 May; 22:02	(Soviet Union) Molniya-M/Blok ML		(Soviet Union) Plesetsk Site 43/3		(Soviet Union)	
28 May; 22:02	(Soviet Union) Molniya-1K 54 (Molniya-1K 63L)		Molniya	Communications	19 November 1992	Success
=== June ===
1 June; 04:37	(Soviet Union) Kosmos-3M		(Soviet Union) Plesetsk Site 132/1		(Soviet Union)	
1 June; 04:37	(Soviet Union) Kosmos 1371 (Stela-2M #28)		LEO, inclination 74.0 degrees	Communications	In orbit	Successful
1 June; 13:58	(Soviet Union) Tsyklon-2		(Soviet Union) Baikonur Site 90/20		(Soviet Union)	
1 June; 13:58	(Soviet Union) Kosmos 1372 (US-A #21)		LEO, inclination 65.1 degrees	Radar ocean surveillance	9 September	Successful
2 June; 15:50	(Soviet Union) Soyuz-U		(Soviet Union) Baikonur Site 31/6		(Soviet Union)	
2 June; 15:50	(Soviet Union) Kosmos 1373 (Zenit-6U/Argon #59)	GRU	Low Earth	Reconnaissance	16 June	Successful
3 June; 21:30	(Soviet Union) K65-RB5		(Soviet Union) Kapustin Yar Site 107		(Soviet Union)	
3 June; 21:30	(Soviet Union) Kosmos 1374 (BOR-4 #2, s/n 404)		Fractional LEO, inclination 50.6 degrees	Re-entry test	3 June	Successful
6 June; 17:10	(Soviet Union) Kosmos-3M		(Soviet Union) Plesetsk Site 132/2		(Soviet Union)	
6 June; 17:10	(Soviet Union) Kosmos 1375 (DS-P1-M #16)		LEO, inclination 65.8 degrees	Anti-satellite weapon target	18 June (destroyed)	Successful
6 June; 17:10	Target for Kosmos 1379					
8 June; 07:45	(Soviet Union) Soyuz-U		(Soviet Union) Plesetsk Site 43/3		(Soviet Union)	
8 June; 07:45	(Soviet Union) Kosmos 1376 (Resurs-F1 (17F41) #8)		Low Earth	Earth observation	22 June	Successful
8 June; 12:00	(Soviet Union) Soyuz-U		(Soviet Union) Baikonur Site 31/6		(Soviet Union)	
8 June; 12:00	(Soviet Union) Kosmos 1377 (Yantar-4K1/Oktan #4)	GRU	Low Earth	Reconnaissance	22 July	Successful
9 June; 00:24	(United States) Delta 3910/PAM-D	D-162	(United States) Cape Canaveral LC-17A		(United States)	
9 June; 00:24	(United States) Westar 5	Western Union	Geostationary	Communications	In orbit	Successful
10 June; 17:37	(Soviet Union) Tsyklon-3		(Soviet Union) Plesetsk Site 32/1		(Soviet Union)	
10 June; 17:37	(Soviet Union) Kosmos 1378 (Tselina-D #36)		LEO, inclination 82.5 degrees	ELINT	In orbit	Successful
12 June; 09:00	(Soviet Union) Soyuz-U		(Soviet Union) Baikonur Site 31/6		(Soviet Union)	
12 June; 09:00	(Soviet Union) Zenit-6U/Argon #60	GRU	Intended: Low Earth	Reconnaissance	12 June	Failure
18 June; 11:04	(Soviet Union) Tsyklon-2		(Soviet Union) Baikonur LC 90		(Soviet Union)	
18 June; 11:04	(Soviet Union) Kosmos 1379 (IS-A #13)		LEO, inclination 65.8 degrees	Anti-satellite weapon test	18 June (self-destruct)	Successful
18 June; 11:04	Destroyed Kosmos 1375					
18 June; 11:58	(Soviet Union) Kosmos-3M		(Soviet Union) Plesetsk LC132		(Soviet Union)	
18 June; 11:58	(Soviet Union) Kosmos 1380 (Parus #33)		LEO, inclination 82.9 degrees	Communications, navigation	27 June	Partial launch failure
18 June; 11:58	Second stage malfunction during first burn resulted in low transfer orbit apogee. Satellite was deployed in lower than planned orbit.					
18 June; 13:00	(Soviet Union) Soyuz-U		(Soviet Union) Baikonur Site 31/6		(Soviet Union)	
18 June; 13:00	(Soviet Union) Kosmos 1381 (Zenit-6U/Argon #61)	GRU	Low Earth	Reconnaissance	1 July	Successful
24 June; 16:29	(Soviet Union) Soyuz-U		(Soviet Union) Baikonur Site 1/5		(Soviet Union)	
24 June; 16:29	(Soviet Union) Soyuz T-6		Low Earth (Salyut 7)	Salyut 7 EP-1	2 July; 14:20	Successful
24 June; 16:29	Crewed orbital flight with three cosmonauts including the first French space traveller					
25 June; 02:28	(Soviet Union) Molniya-M/Blok 2BL		(Soviet Union) Plesetsk Site 41/1		(Soviet Union)	
25 June; 02:28	(Soviet Union) Kosmos 1382 (US-K #27)		Molniya	Early warning	In orbit	Successful
27 June; 15:00	(United States) Space Shuttle Columbia		(United States) Kennedy LC-39A		(United States) United Space Alliance	
27 June; 15:00	(United States) STS-4	NASA	Low Earth	Developmental test flight	4 July; 16:09	Successful
27 June; 15:00	(United States) Classified	US Air Force			4 July; 16:09	Successful
27 June; 15:00	(United States) Getaway Special	Utah State	Low Earth (Columbia)		4 July; 16:09	Successful
27 June; 15:00	Crewed orbital flight with two astronauts, final developmental test flight					
29 June; 21:45	(Soviet Union) Kosmos-3M		(Soviet Union) Plesetsk Site 132/1		(Soviet Union)	
29 June; 21:45	(Soviet Union) Kosmos 1383 Kosmos 1383 (Nadezhda #1, COSPAS 1)	COSPAS-SARSAT	LEO, inclination 82.9 degrees	Navigation, search and rescue	In orbit	Successful
30 June; 15:00	(Soviet Union) Soyuz-U		(Soviet Union) Plesetsk Site 41/1		(Soviet Union)	
30 June; 15:00	(Soviet Union) Kosmos 1384 (Yantar-2K/Feniks #26)	GRU	Low Earth	Reconnaissance	30 July	Successful
=== July ===
6 July; 07:50	(Soviet Union) Soyuz-U		(Soviet Union) Plesetsk Site 41/1		(Soviet Union)	
6 July; 07:50	(Soviet Union) Kosmos 1385 (Zenit-6U/Argon #62)	GRU	Low Earth	Reconnaissance	20 July	Successful
7 July; 09:47	(Soviet Union) Kosmos-3M		(Soviet Union) Plesetsk Site 132/1		(Soviet Union)	
7 July; 09:47	(Soviet Union) Kosmos 1386 (Parus #34)		LEO, inclination 83.0 degrees	Navigation, communications	In orbit	Successful
10 July; 09:57	(Soviet Union) Soyuz-U		(Soviet Union) Baikonur Site 1/5		(Soviet Union)	
10 July; 09:57	(Soviet Union) Progress 14		Low Earth (Salyut 7)	Logistics	13 August; 01:29	Successful
13 July; 08:00	(Soviet Union) Soyuz-U		(Soviet Union) Plesetsk Site 43/3		(Soviet Union)	
13 July; 08:00	(Soviet Union) Kosmos 1387 (Zenit-4MKT/Fram #21)	GRU	Low Earth	Reconnaissance	26 July	Successful
16 July; 17:59	(United States) Delta 3920	D-163	(United States) Vandenberg SLC-2W		(United States)	
16 July; 17:59	(United States) Landsat 4	NASA/NOAA	SSO	Earth observation	In orbit	Successful
21 July; 06:31	(Soviet Union) Kosmos-3M		(Soviet Union) Plesetsk LC132		(Soviet Union)	
21 July; 06:31	(Soviet Union) Kosmos 1388 - 1395 (Strela-1M #241-#248)		LEO, inclination 74.0 degrees	Communications	In orbit	Successful
21 July; 09:40	(Soviet Union) Molniya-M/Blok ML		(Soviet Union) Baikonur Site 1/5		(Soviet Union)	
21 July; 09:40	(Soviet Union) Molniya-1K 55 (Molniya-1K 62L)		Molniya	Communications	8 October 1992	Successful
22 July; 22:11	(Soviet Union) Proton-K/Blok DM		(Soviet Union) Baikonur Site 200/40		(Soviet Union)	
22 July; 22:11	(Soviet Union) Ekran 23L		Intended: Geostationary	Communications	22 July	Failure
22 July; 22:11	Hydraulic system of the first stage failed, automatic flight termination at T+45 seconds.					
27 July; 12:30	(Soviet Union) Soyuz-U		(Soviet Union) Pleetsk Site 16/2		(Soviet Union)	
27 July; 12:30	(Soviet Union) Kosmos 1396 (Zenit-6U/Argon #63)	GRU	Low Earth	Reconnaissance	10 August	Successful
29 July; 19:40	(Soviet Union) Kosmos-3M		(Soviet Union) Kapustin Yar Site 107/1		(Soviet Union)	
29 July; 19:40	(Soviet Union) Kosmos 1397 (Taifun-2 #13) / 22 Romb subsatellites		LEO, inclination 50.6 degrees	Radar calibration	18 May 1983	Successful
=== August ===
3 August; 11:30	(Soviet Union) Soyuz-U		(Soviet Union) Plesetsk Site 43/3		(Soviet Union)	
3 August; 11:30	(Soviet Union) Kosmos 1398 (Zenit-4MT/Orion #23)	GRU	Low Earth	Reconnaissance	13 August	Successful
4 August; 11:30	(Soviet Union) Soyuz-U		(Soviet Union) Baikonur Site 31/6		(Soviet Union)	
4 August; 11:30	(Soviet Union) Kosmos 1399 (Yantar-4K1/Oktan #5)	GRU	Low Earth	Reconnaissance	16 September	Successful
5 August; 06:56	(Soviet Union) Vostok-2M		(Soviet Union) Plesetsk Site 16/2		(Soviet Union)	
5 August; 06:56	(Soviet Union) Kosmos 1400 (Tselina-D #37)		Low Earth	ELINT	13 September 2014	Successful
19 August; 17:11	(Soviet Union) Soyuz-U		(Soviet Union) Baikonur Site 1/5		(Soviet Union)	
19 August; 17:11	(Soviet Union) Soyuz T-7		Low Earth (Salyut 7)	Salyut 7 EP-2	10 December; 19:02	Successful
19 August; 17:11	Crewed orbital flight with three cosmonauts					
20 August; 09:50	(Soviet Union) Soyuz-U		(Soviet Union) Plesetsk Site 41/1		(Soviet Union)	
20 August; 09:50	(Soviet Union) Kosmos 1401 (Resurs-F1 (17F41) #9)		Low Earth	Earth observation	3 September	Successful
26 August; 23:10	(United States) Delta 3920/PAM-D		(United States) Cape Canaveral LC-17A		(United States)	
26 August; 23:10	(Canada) Anik D1 (1238kg)	Telesat Canada	Geostationary	Communications	In orbit	Successful
27 August; 00:02	(Soviet Union) Molniya-M/Blok ML		(Soviet Union) Plesetsk Site 41/1		(Soviet Union)	
27 August; 00:02	(Soviet Union) Molniya-3 19 (Molniya-3 33L)		Molniya	Communications	13 January 2002	Successful
30 August; 10:06	(Soviet Union) Tsyklon-2		(Soviet Union) Baikonur Site 90/19		(Soviet Union)	
30 August; 10:06	(Soviet Union) Kosmos 1402 (US-A #22)		LEO, inclination 65.0 degrees	Radar ocean surveillance	23 January 1983 (bus); 7 February 1983 (nuclear core)	Successful
30 August; 19:55	(Soviet Union) Kosmos-3M		(Soviet Union) Plesetsk Site 132/2		(Soviet Union)	
30 August; 19:55	(Soviet Union) Strela-2M #29		Intended: Low Earth	Communications	30 August	Failure
=== September ===
1 September; 09:00	(Soviet Union) Soyuz-U		(Soviet Union) Baikonur Site 31/6		(Soviet Union)	
1 September; 09:00	(Soviet Union) Kosmos 1403 (Zenit-6U/Argon #64)	GRU	Low Earth	Reconnaissance	15 September	Successful
1 September; 09:00	(Soviet Union) Soyuz-U		(Soviet Union) Plesetsk Site 43/3		(Soviet Union)	
1 September; 09:00	(Soviet Union) Kosmos 1404 (Zenit-6U/Argon #65)	GRU	Low Earth	Reconnaissance	15 September	Successful
3 September; 05:00	(Japan) (United States) N-I		(Japan) Tanegashima Space Center LA-N (LA-Y1)		(Japan) NASDA	
3 September; 05:00	(Japan) ETS 3 (Kiku 4) (385 kg)		LEO, inclination 44.6 degrees	Technology testing	In orbit	Successful
3 September; 05:00	Final flight of the N-I					
4 September; 17:50	(Soviet Union) Tsyklon-2		(Soviet Union) Baikonur Site 90/20		(Soviet Union)	
4 September; 17:50	(Soviet Union) Kosmos 1405 (US-P #15)		LEO, inclination 65.0 degrees	ELINT ocean surveillance	5 February 1984	Successful
8 September; 10:20	(Soviet Union) Soyuz-U		(Soviet Union) Plesetsk Site 41/1		(Soviet Union)	
8 September; 10:20	(Soviet Union) Kosmos 1406 (Zenit-4MKT/Fram #22)	GRU	Low Earth	Reconnaissance	21 September	Successful
9 September; 02:12	(France) Ariane 1		(France) Kourou ELA		(France) Arianespace	
9 September; 02:12	MARECS B	Inmarsat	Intended: Geostationary	Communications	9 September	Launch Failure
9 September; 02:12	(Italy) Sirio 2		Intended: Geostationary	Communications	9 September	Launch Failure
9 September; 02:12	Third stage turbopump malfunction					
9 September; 07:19	(China) Long March 2C		(China) Jiuquan Satellite Launch Center LA-2B (Site 138)		(China)	
9 September; 07:19	(China) FSW-0 4		Low Earth	Reconnaissance	21 September	Successful
9 September; 07:19	Maiden flight of Long March 2C					
9 September; 15:12	(United States) Conestoga I		(United States) Matagorda Island		(United States) Space Services Inc.	
9 September; 15:12	(United States) Test payload	Space Services Inc.	Suborbital	Test flight	9 September	Successful
9 September; 15:12	First private rocket to reach space. Apogee: ~ 309 kilometers (192 miles)					
15 September; 15:30	(Soviet Union) Soyuz-U		(Soviet Union) Plesetsk Site 41/1		(Soviet Union)	
15 September; 15:30	(Soviet Union) Kosmos 1407 (Yantar-2K/Feniks #27)	GRU	Low Earth	Reconnaissance	16 October	Successful
16 September; 04:55	(Soviet Union) Tsyklon-3		(Soviet Union) Plesetsk Site 32/2		(Soviet Union)	
16 September; 04:55	(Soviet Union) Kosmos 1408 (Tselina-D #38)		LEO, inclination 82.6 degrees	ELINT	Destroyed on 15 November 2021	Successful
16 September; 04:55	Satellite was destroyed by an anti-satellite missile test on 15 November 2021.					
16 September; 18:31	(Soviet Union) Proton-K/Blok DM		(Soviet Union) Baikonur Site 200/40		(Soviet Union)	
16 September; 18:31	(Soviet Union) Ekran 9 (Ekran 24L)		Geostationary	Communications	In orbit	Successful
18 September; 04:58	(Soviet Union) Soyuz-U		(Soviet Union) Baikonur		(Soviet Union)	
18 September; 04:58	(Soviet Union) Progress 15		Low Earth (Salyut 7)	Logistics	16 October; 17:06	Successful
22 September; 06:23	(Soviet Union) Molniya-M/Blok 2BL		(Soviet Union) Plesetsk Site 16/2		(Soviet Union)	
22 September; 06:23	(Soviet Union) Kosmos 1409 (US-K #28)		Molniya	Early warning	8 June 2009	Successful
24 September; 09:15	(Soviet Union) Tsyklon-3		(Soviet Union) Plesetsk Site 32/1		(Soviet Union)	
24 September; 09:15	(Soviet Union) Kosmos 1410 (Geo-IK/Musson #3)		LEO, inclination 82.6 degrees	Geodesy	In orbit	Successful
28 September; 23:17 (Note: Originally scheduled for night of 23 September. Postponed – originally to 28 October – due to power supply failure in another, identical, satellite. The launch was moved back up to 28 September after engineers realized the failure was not caused by a design flaw.)	(United States) Atlas SLV-3D Centaur-D1AR	AC-60	(United States) Cape Canaveral LC-36B		(United States)	
28 September; 23:17	(United Nations) Intelsat V F-5	Intelsat	Geostationary	Communications	In orbit	Successful
30 September; 11:50	(Soviet Union) Soyuz-U		(Soviet Union) Plesetsk Site 16/2		(Soviet Union)	
30 September; 11:50	(Soviet Union) Kosmos 1411 (Zenit-6U/Argon #66)	GRU	Low Earth	Reconnaissance	14 October	Successful
=== October ===
2 October; 00:01	(Soviet Union) Tsyklon-2		(Soviet Union) Baikonur Site 90/20		(Soviet Union)	
2 October; 00:01	(Soviet Union) Kosmos 1412 (US-A #23)		LEO, inclination 64.8 degrees	Radar ocean surveillance	In orbit	Successful
12 October; 14:56	(Soviet Union) Proton-K/Blok DM-2		(Soviet Union) Baikonur Site 200/39		(Soviet Union)	
12 October; 14:56	(Soviet Union) Kosmos 1413 (Uragan-GVM #1)		Medium Earth orbit	Boilerplate	In orbit	Successful
12 October; 14:56	(Soviet Union) Kosmos 1414 (Uragan #1)		Medium Earth orbit	Navigation	In orbit	Successful
12 October; 14:56	(Soviet Union) Kosmos 1415 (Uragan-GVM #2)		Medium Earth orbit	Boilerplate	In orbit	Successful
12 October; 14:56	First flight of Blok DM-2 upper stage. First launch of GLONASS navigation system, with one operational satellite and two mass simulators to test the triple launch system					
14 October; 09:10	(Soviet Union) Soyuz-U		(Soviet Union) Baikonur Site 31/6		(Soviet Union)	
14 October; 09:10	(Soviet Union) Kosmos 1416 (Zenit-6U/Argon #67)	GRU	Low Earth	Reconnaissance	28 October	Successful
19 October; 05:58	(Soviet Union) Kosmos-3M		(Soviet Union) Plesetsk Site 132/1		(Soviet Union)	
19 October; 05:58	(Soviet Union) Kosmos 1417(Parus #35)		LEO, inclination 83.0 degrees	navigation, Communication	In orbit	Successful
20 October; 16:26	(Soviet Union) Proton-K/Blok DM		(Soviet Union) Baikonur Site 200/40		(Soviet Union)	
20 October; 16:26	(Soviet Union) Gorizont 6 (Gorizont 16L)		Geostationary	Communications	In orbit	Successful
21 October; 01:40	(Soviet Union) Kosmos-3M		(Soviet Union) Kapustin Yar Site 107/1		(Soviet Union)	
21 October; 01:40	(Soviet Union) Kosmos 1418 (Taifun-1B #3)		LEO	Radar calibration	30 September 1983	Successful
28 October; 01:27	(United States) Delta 3924		(United States) Cape Canaveral LC-17A		(United States)	
28 October; 01:27	(United States) Satcom 5 (Aurora 1) (1102kg)	RCA Americom	GTO	Communications satellite	In orbit	Successful
30 October; 04:05	(United States) Titan 34D/IUS		(United States) Cape Canaveral LC-40		(United States)	
30 October; 04:05	(United States) OPS 9945 (DSCS II F-16)	US Air Force	Geostationary	Communications	In orbit	Successful
30 October; 04:05	(United States) DSCS III A-1	US Air Force	Geostationary	Communications	In orbit	Successful
30 October; 04:05	Maiden flight of Titan 34D and Inertial Upper Stage					
31 October; 11:20	(Soviet Union) Soyuz-U		(Soviet Union) Baikonur Site 1/5		(Soviet Union)	
31 October; 11:20	(Soviet Union) Progress 16		Low Earth (Salyut 7)	Logistics	14 December; 17:17	Successful
31 October; 11:20	(Soviet Union) Iskra 3 (RK 03)	MAI	Low Earth	Amateur radio	16 December	Successful
31 October; 11:20	Iskra 3 deployed through Salyut 7 airlock					
=== November ===
2 November; 09:30	(Soviet Union) Soyuz-U		(Soviet Union) Baikonur Site 31/6		(Soviet Union)	
2 November; 09:30	(Soviet Union) Kosmos 1419 (Zenit-6U/Argon #68)	GRU	Low Earth	Reconnaissance	16 November	Successful
11 November; 06:14	(Soviet Union) Kosmos-3M		(Soviet Union) Plesetsk Site 132/1		(Soviet Union)	
11 November; 06:14	(Soviet Union) Kosmos 1420 (Strela-2 #30)		LEO, inclination 74.0 degrees	Communication	In orbit	Successful
11 November; 12:19	(United States) Space Shuttle Columbia		(United States) Kennedy LC-39A		(United States) United Space Alliance	
11 November; 12:19	(United States) STS-5	NASA	Low Earth	Satellite deployment	16 November; 14:33	Successful
11 November; 12:19	(United States) SBS-3	SBS	Current: Graveyard; Operational: Geosynchronous	Communications	In orbit	Successful
11 November; 12:19	(Canada) Anik C3	Telesat Canada	Current: Graveyard; Operational: Geosynchronous	Communications	In orbit	Successful
11 November; 12:19	(West Germany) Getaway Special	West Germany	Low Earth	Microgravity research	16 November	Successful
11 November; 12:19	Crewed orbital flight with four astronauts; First "operational" Shuttle flight Anik C3 retired 18 June 1997					
17 November; 21:22	(United States) Titan IIID		(United States) Vandenberg SLC-4E		(United States)	
17 November; 21:22	(United States) OPS 9627 (KH-11-5)	NRO	Sun-synchronous	Reconnaissance	13 August 1985	Successful
17 November; 21:22	Final flight of Titan IIID					
18 November; 09:25	(Soviet Union) Soyuz-U		(Soviet Union) Baikonur Site 31/6		(Soviet Union)	
18 November; 09:25	(Soviet Union) Kosmos 1421 (Zenit-6U/Argon #69)	GRU	Low Earth	Reconnaissance	2 December	Successful
24 November; 11:00	(Soviet Union) Kosmos-3M		(Soviet Union) Plesetsk Site 132/1		(Soviet Union)	
24 November; 11:00	(Soviet Union) Strela-1M #249-#256		Intended: Low Earth	Communications	24 November	Failure
26 November; 14:13	(Soviet Union) Proton-K/Blok DM		(Soviet Union) Baikonur Site 200/39		(Soviet Union)	
26 November; 14:13	(Soviet Union) Raduga 11 (Gran 21L)		Geostationary	Communications	In orbit	Successful
=== December ===
3 December; 12:00	(Soviet Union) Soyuz-U		(Soviet Union) Plesetsk Site 43/3		(Soviet Union)	
3 December; 12:00	(Soviet Union) Kosmos 1422 (Zenit-6U/Argon #70)	GRU	Low Earth	Reconnaissance	17 December	Successful
8 December; 13:46	(Soviet Union) Molniya-M/Blok ML		(Soviet Union) Baikonur Site 1/5		(Soviet Union)	
8 December; 13:46	(Soviet Union) Kosmos 1423 (Molniya-1K 60L)		Intended: Molniya; Achieved: Low Earth		18 January 1986	Partial failure
14 December; 22:30	(Soviet Union) Vostok-2M		(Soviet Union) Plesetsk Site 43/3		(Soviet Union)	
14 December; 22:30	(Soviet Union) Meteor-2 9		Low Earth	Weather	In orbit	Successful
16 December; 10:00	(Soviet Union) Soyuz-U		(Soviet Union) Baikonur Site 31/6		(Soviet Union)	
16 December; 10:00	(Soviet Union) Kosmos 1424 (Yantar-4K1/Oktan #6)	GRU	Low Earth	Reconnaissance	28 January 1983	Successful
21 December; 02:38	(United States) Atlas E/Star-37S-ISS		(United States) Vandenberg SLC-3W		(United States)	
21 December; 02:38	(United States) DMSP 5D-2 F6	US Air Force	Sun-synchronous	Weather	In orbit	Successful
23 December; 09:10	(Soviet Union) Soyuz-U2		(Soviet Union) Baikonur Site 1/5		(Soviet Union)	
23 December; 09:10	(Soviet Union) Kosmos 1425 (Zenit-6U/Argon #71)	GRU	Low Earth	Reconnaissance	6 January 1983	Successful
23 December; 09:10	Maiden flight of Soyuz-U2, fuelled by syntin					
24 December; 12:00	(Soviet Union) Proton-K/Blok DM		(Soviet Union) Baikonur 200/39		(Soviet Union)	
24 December; 12:00	(Soviet Union) Raduga (Gran 22L)		Intended: Geostationary	Communications	24 December	Failure
24 December; 12:00	Second stage engine failure at T+230 seconds, due to high frequency vibrations.					
28 December; 12:00	(Soviet Union) Soyuz-U		(Soviet Union) Baikonur Site 31/6		(Soviet Union)	
28 December; 12:00	(Soviet Union) Kosmos 1426 (Yantar-4KS1/Terilen #1)	GRU	Low Earth	Reconnaissance	5 March 1983	Successful
28 December; 12:00	First Soviet electro-optical reconnaissance satellite					
29 December; 12:00	(Soviet Union) Kosmos-3M		(Soviet Union) Plesetsk Site 132/1		(Soviet Union)	
29 December; 12:00	(Soviet Union) Kosmos 1427 (Tafun-1B #4)		LEO, inclination 65.8 degrees	Radar calibration	5 October 1989	Successful

- ← Jan
- Feb
- Mar
- Apr
- May
- Jun
- Jul
- Aug
- Sep
- Oct
- Nov
- Dec →

== Suborbital launches ==
- ← Jan
- Feb
- Mar
- Apr
- May
- Jun
- Jul
- Aug
- Sep
- Oct
- Nov
- Dec →

Date and time (UTC)	Rocket	Flight number	Launch site		LSP	
Date and time (UTC)	Payload	Operator	Orbit	Function	Decay (UTC)	Outcome
Date and time (UTC)	Remarks					
=== July-September ===
9 September; 15:12	(United States) Conestoga 1		(United States) Matagorda Island		(United States) Space Services Inc.	
9 September; 15:12	(West Germany) DLR M-AR-116	DLR	Suborbital	Test flight	9 September	Successful
9 September; 15:12	Re-branded Aries. Apogee: 309 km					

- ← Jan
- Feb
- Mar
- Apr
- May
- Jun
- Jul
- Aug
- Sep
- Oct
- Nov
- Dec →

== Deep-space rendezvous ==
Date (GMT)	Spacecraft	Event	Remarks
1 March	Venera 13	landed on Venus	
5 March	Venera 14	landed on Venus	
30 March	ISEE-3/ICE	1st flyby of the Moon	Closest approach: 19,570 kilometres (12,160 mi)
23 April	ISEE-3/ICE	2nd flyby of the Moon	Closest approach: 21,137 kilometres (13,134 mi)
27 September	ISEE-3/ICE	3rd flyby of the Moon	Closest approach: 22,790 kilometres (14,160 mi)

== EVAs ==
Start date/time	Duration	End time	Spacecraft	Crew	Remarks
30 July; 02:39	2 hours 33 minutes	05:12	Salyut 7 EO-1	(Soviet Union) Anatoly Berezovoy (Soviet Union) Valentin Lebedev	Performing the first EVA from Salyut 7, Lebedev anchored himself with a foot restraint, while Berezovoy assisted from the hatch. After collecting and placing samples on the exterior surface of the spacecraft, Lebedev tested methods for assembly and disassembly work in space, including the Istok panel experiment of turning bolts with a special wrench.
