= List of Kosmos satellites (1251–1500) =

The designation Kosmos (Russian: Космос meaning Cosmos) is a generic name given to a large number of Soviet, and subsequently Russian, satellites, the first of which was launched in 1962. Satellites given Kosmos designations include military spacecraft, failed probes to the Moon and the planets, prototypes for crewed spacecraft, and scientific spacecraft. This is a list of satellites with Kosmos designations between 1251 and 1500.

Designation	Type	Launch date (GMT)	Carrier rocket	Function	Decay/Destruction*	Remarks
Kosmos 1251	Strela-1M	6 March 1981; 11:31	Kosmos-3M 11K65M	Communication	in orbit	Launched with Kosmos 1250
Kosmos 1252	Strela-1M	6 March 1981; 11:31	Kosmos-3M 11K65M	Communication	in orbit	Launched with Kosmos 1250
Kosmos 1253	Strela-1M	6 March 1981; 11:31	Kosmos-3M 11K65M	Communication	in orbit	Launched with Kosmos 1250
Kosmos 1254	Strela-1M	6 March 1981; 11:31	Kosmos-3M 11K65M	Communication	in orbit	Launched with Kosmos 1250
Kosmos 1255	Strela-1M	6 March 1981; 11:31	Kosmos-3M 11K65M	Communication	in orbit	Launched with Kosmos 1250
Kosmos 1256	Strela-1M	6 March 1981; 11:31	Kosmos-3M 11K65M	Communication	in orbit	Launched with Kosmos 1250
Kosmos 1257	Strela-1M	6 March 1981; 11:31	Kosmos-3M 11K65M	Communication	in orbit	Launched with Kosmos 1250
Kosmos 1258	IS	14 March 1981; 16:55	Tsyklon-2 11K69	ASAT test	14 March 1981	Failed to intercept Kosmos 1241
Kosmos 1259	Zenit-6	17 March 1981; 08:40	Soyuz-U 11A511U	Reconnaissance	31 March 1981	
Kosmos 1260	US-P	20 March 1981; 23:45	Tsyklon-2 11K69	ELINT	22 May 1982	
Kosmos 1261	US-K	31 March 1981; 09:40	Molniya-M 8K78M	Missile defense	April 1981	Self-Destructed. All Debris still in orbit.
Kosmos 1262	Zenit-6	7 April 1981; 10:51	Soyuz-U 11A511U	Reconnaissance	21 April 1981	
Kosmos 1263	Taifun-1	9 April 1981; 12:00	Kosmos-3M 11K65M	Radar target	in orbit	
Kosmos 1264	Zenit-6	15 April 1981; 10:30	Soyuz-U 11A511U	Reconnaissance	29 April 1981	
Kosmos 1265	Zenit-6	16 April 1981; 11:30	Soyuz-U 11A511U	Reconnaissance	28 April 1981	
Kosmos 1266	US-A	21 April 1981; 03:45	Tsyklon-2 11K69	Reconnaissance	20 May 1981	
Kosmos 1267	TKS	25 April 1981; 02:01	Proton-K 8K72K	Technology	29 July 1982	Docked with Salyut 6
Kosmos 1268	Zenit-6	28 April 1981; 09:00	Soyuz-U 11A511U	Reconnaissance	12 May 1981	
Kosmos 1269	Strela-2	7 May 1981; 13:21	Kosmos-3M 11K65M	Communication	in orbit	
Kosmos 1270	Yantar-2K	18 May 1981; 11:50	Soyuz-U 11A511U	Reconnaissance	17 June 1981	
Kosmos 1271	Tselina-D	19 May 1981; 03:49	Vostok-2M 8A92M	ELINT	May 3, 2013	1981-046A
Kosmos 1272	Zenit-6	21 May 1981; 09:10	Soyuz-U 11A511U	Reconnaissance	4 June 1981	
Kosmos 1273	Zenit-4MKT	22 May 1981; 07:10	Soyuz-U 11A511U	Reconnaissance	4 June 1981	
Kosmos 1274	Yantar-2K	3 June 1981; 14:00	Soyuz-U 11A511U	Reconnaissance	3 July 1981	
Kosmos 1275	Parus	4 June 1981; 15:41	Kosmos-3M 11K65M	Navigation, Communication	destroyed by space debris 24 July 1981	
Kosmos 1276	Zenit-4MKT	16 June 1981; 07:00	Soyuz-U 11A511U	Reconnaissance	29 June 1981	
Kosmos 1277	Zenit-6	17 June 1981; 09:30	Soyuz-U 11A511U	Reconnaissance	1 July 1981	
Kosmos 1278	US-K	19 June 1981; 19:37	Molniya-M 8K78M	Missile defense/Early warning	Early December 1986	Deactivated in 1984. Pieces may have decayed, but they are unable track them.
Kosmos 1279	Zenit-6	1 July 1981; 09:30	Soyuz-U 11A511U	Reconnaissance	15 July 1981	
Kosmos 1280	Resurs-F1	2 July 1981; 07:10	Soyuz-U 11A511U	Remote sensing	15 July 1981	
Kosmos 1281	Zenit-6	7 July 1981; 12:30	Soyuz-U 11A511U	Reconnaissance	21 July 1981	
Kosmos 1282	Yantar-2K	15 July 1981; 13:00	Soyuz-U 11A511U	Reconnaissance	14 August 1981	
Kosmos 1283	Zenit-6	17 July 1981; 08:00	Soyuz-U 11A511U	Reconnaissance	31 July 1981	
Kosmos 1284	Zenit-6	29 July 1981; 11:55	Soyuz-U 11A511U	Reconnaissance	12 August 1981	
Kosmos 1285	US-K	4 August 1981; 00:13	Molniya-M 8K78M	Missile defense	21 November 1981	Never made it to final orbit. Self Destructed. Pieces still in orbit.
Kosmos 1286	US-P	4 August 1981; 08:28	Tsyklon-2 11K69	ELINT	16 October 1982	
Kosmos 1287	Strela-1M	6 August 1981; 11:49	Kosmos-3M 11K65M	Communication	in orbit	
Kosmos 1288	Strela-1M	6 August 1981; 11:49	Kosmos-3M 11K65M	Communication	in orbit	
Kosmos 1289	Strela-1M	6 August 1981; 11:49	Kosmos-3M 11K65M	Communication	in orbit	
Kosmos 1290	Strela-1M	6 August 1981; 11:49	Kosmos-3M 11K65M	Communication	in orbit	
Kosmos 1291	Strela-1M	6 August 1981; 11:49	Kosmos-3M 11K65M	Communication	in orbit	
Kosmos 1292	Strela-1M	6 August 1981; 11:49	Kosmos-3M 11K65M	Communication	in orbit	
Kosmos 1293	Strela-1M	6 August 1981; 11:49	Kosmos-3M 11K65M	Communication	in orbit	
Kosmos 1294	Strela-1M	6 August 1981; 11:49	Kosmos-3M 11K65M	Communication	in orbit	
Kosmos 1295	Parus	12 August 1981; 05:46	Kosmos-3M 11K65M	Navigation, Communication	in orbit	
Kosmos 1296	Yantar-2K	13 August 1981; 16:20	Soyuz-U 11A511U	Reconnaissance	13 September 1981	
Kosmos 1297	Zenit-6	18 August 1981; 09:30	Soyuz-U 11A511U	Reconnaissance	30 August 1981	
Kosmos 1298	Yantar-4K2	21 August 1981; 10:20	Soyuz-U 11A511U	Reconnaissance	2 October 1981	
Kosmos 1299	US-A	24 August 1981; 16:37	Tsyklon-2 11K69	Reconnaissance	27 September 1981	
Kosmos 1300	Tselina-D	24 August 1981; 21:40	Tsyklon-3 11K68	ELINT	in orbit	
Kosmos 1301	Resurs-F1	27 August 1981; 10:30	Soyuz-U 11A511U	Remote sensing	10 September 1981	
Kosmos 1302	Strela-2	28 August 1981; 16:18	Kosmos-3M 11K65M	Communication	in orbit	
Kosmos 1303	Zenit-6	4 September 1981; 08:00	Soyuz-U 11A511U	Reconnaissance	18 September 1981	
Kosmos 1304	Tsikada	4 September 1981; 11:06	Kosmos-3M 11K65M	Navigation	in orbit	
Kosmos 1305	Molniya-3	11 September 1981; 08:43	Molniya-M 8K78M	Communication, telemetry	11 September 1981	on orbit: 648kmx13870km, i=63° (aka."norway" Asbm A).
Kosmos 1306	US-P	14 September 1981; 20:31	Tsyklon-2 11K69	ELINT	12 December 1982	
Kosmos 1307	Zenit-6	15 September 1981; 11:30	Soyuz-U 11A511U	Reconnaissance	29 September 1981	
Kosmos 1308	Parus	18 September 1981; 03:34	Kosmos-3M 11K65M	Navigation, Communication	in orbit	
Kosmos 1309	Zenit-4MT	18 September 1981; 09:30	Soyuz-U 11A511U	Reconnaissance	1 October 1981	
Kosmos 1310	Taifun-1	23 September 1981; 08:00	Kosmos-3M 11K65M	Radar target	3 April 1989	
Kosmos 1311	Romb	28 September 1981; 21:00	Kosmos-3M 11K65M	Calibration	28 August 1983	
Kosmos 1312	Geo-IK	30 September 1981; 08:00	Tsyklon-3 11K68	Geodesy	in orbit	Plesetsk launch. Orbit 1,491 x 1,514 km. Inclination 82.6 degrees. First of new upgraded series of geodetic satellites. Carried out study of the shape of the Earth and the accurate mapping of the Earth's surface to enable accurate targeting of military missiles.
Kosmos 1313	Zenit-6	1 October 1981; 09:00	Soyuz-U 11A511U	Reconnaissance	15 October 1981	
Kosmos 1314	Zenit-4MKT	9 October 1981; 10:40	Soyuz-U 11A511U	Reconnaissance	22 October 1981	
Kosmos 1315	Tselina-D	13 October 1981; 23:01	Vostok-2M 8A92M	ELINT	31 August 2015	
Kosmos 1316	Zenit-6	15 October 1981; 09:15	Soyuz-U 11A511U	Reconnaissance	29 October 1981	
Kosmos 1317	US-K	31 October 1981; 22:54	Molniya-M 8K78M	Missile defense	26 January 1984	Self-Destructed. Pieces still in orbit
Kosmos 1318	Yantar-2K	3 November 1981; 13:00	Soyuz-U 11A511U	Reconnaissance	4 December 1981	
Kosmos 1319	Zenit-6	13 November 1981; 09:30	Soyuz-U 11A511U	Reconnaissance	27 November 1981	
Kosmos 1320	Strela-1M	28 November 1981; 18:08	Kosmos-3M 11K65M	Communication	in orbit	
Kosmos 1321	Strela-1M	28 November 1981; 18:08	Kosmos-3M 11K65M	Communication	in orbit	
Kosmos 1322	Strela-1M	28 November 1981; 18:08	Kosmos-3M 11K65M	Communication	in orbit	
Kosmos 1323	Strela-1M	28 November 1981; 18:08	Kosmos-3M 11K65M	Communication	in orbit	
Kosmos 1324	Strela-1M	28 November 1981; 18:08	Kosmos-3M 11K65M	Communication	in orbit	
Kosmos 1325	Strela-1M	28 November 1981; 18:08	Kosmos-3M 11K65M	Communication	in orbit	
Kosmos 1326	Strela-1M	28 November 1981; 18:08	Kosmos-3M 11K65M	Communication	in orbit	
Kosmos 1327	Strela-1M	28 November 1981; 18:08	Kosmos-3M 11K65M	Communication	in orbit	
Kosmos 1328	Tselina-D	3 December 1981; 11:47	Tsyklon-3 11K68	ELINT	in orbit	
Kosmos 1329	Zenit-6	4 December 1981; 09:50	Soyuz-U 11A511U	Reconnaissance	18 December 1981	
Kosmos 1330	Yantar-2K	19 December 1981; 11:50	Soyuz-U 11A511U	Reconnaissance	19 January 1982	
Kosmos 1331	Strela-2	7 January 1982; 15:38	Kosmos-3M 11K65M	Communication	in orbit	
Kosmos 1332	Zenit-4MT	12 January 1982; 12:30	Soyuz-U 11A511U	Reconnaissance	25 January 1982	
Kosmos 1333	Parus	14 January 1982; 07:51	Kosmos-3M 11K65M	Navigation, Communication	in orbit	
Kosmos 1334	Zenit-6	20 January 1982; 11:30	Soyuz-U 11A511U	Reconnaissance	3 February 1982	
Kosmos 1335	Romb	29 January 1982; 11:00	Kosmos-3M 11K65M	Calibration	5 April 1987	
Kosmos 1336	Yantar-2K	30 January 1982; 11:30	Soyuz-U 11A511U	Reconnaissance	26 February 1982	
Kosmos 1337	US-P	11 February 1982; 01:11	Tsyklon-2 11K69	ELINT	25 July 1982	
Kosmos 1338	Zenit-6	16 February 1982; 11:10	Soyuz-U 11A511U	Reconnaissance	2 March 1982	
Kosmos 1339	Tsikada	17 February 1982; 21:56	Kosmos-3M 11K65M	Navigation	in orbit	
Kosmos 1340	Tselina-D	19 February 1982; 01:42	Vostok-2M 8A92M	ELINT	in orbit	
Kosmos 1341	US-K	3 March 1982; 05:44	Molniya-M 8K78M	Missile defense	in orbit	
Kosmos 1342	Zenit-6	5 March 1982; 10:50	Soyuz-U 11A511U	Reconnaissance	19 March 1982	
Kosmos 1343	Zenit-6	17 March 1982; 10:30	Soyuz-U 11A511U	Reconnaissance	31 March 1982	
Kosmos 1344	Parus	24 March 1982; 19:47	Kosmos-3M 11K65M	Navigation, Communication	in orbit	
Kosmos 1345	Tselina-O	31 March 1982; 09:00	Kosmos-3M 11K65M	ELINT	27 September 1989	
Kosmos 1346	Tselina-D	31 March 1982; 16:27	Vostok-2M 8A92M	ELINT	17 December 2017	
Kosmos 1347	Yantar-4K2	2 April 1982; 10:15	Soyuz-U 11A511U	Reconnaissance	22 May 1982	
Kosmos 1348	US-K	7 April 1982; 13:42	Molniya-M 8K78M	Missile defense	in orbit	
Kosmos 1349	Parus	8 April 1982; 00:15	Kosmos-3M 11K65M	Navigation, Communication	in orbit	
Kosmos 1350	Yantar-2K	15 April 1982; 14:30	Soyuz-U 11A511U	Reconnaissance	16 May 1982	
Kosmos 1351	Romb	21 April 1982; 01:40	Kosmos-3M 11K65M	Calibration	14 March 1983	
Kosmos 1352	Zenit-6	21 April 1982; 09:15	Soyuz-U 11A511U	Reconnaissance	5 May 1982	
Kosmos 1353	Zenit-4MKT	23 April 1982; 09:40	Soyuz-U 11A511U	Reconnaissance	6 May 1982	
Kosmos 1354	Strela-2	28 April 1982; 02:52	Kosmos-3M 11K65M	Communication	in orbit	
Kosmos 1355	US-P	29 April 1982; 09:55	Tsyklon-2 11K69	ELINT	7 March 1984	
Kosmos 1356	Tselina-D	5 May 1982; 08:01	Vostok-2M 8A92M	ELINT	8 July 2023	
Kosmos 1357	Strela-1M	6 May 1982; 18:07	Kosmos-3M 11K65M	Communication	in orbit	
Kosmos 1358	Strela-1M	6 May 1982; 18:07	Kosmos-3M 11K65M	Communication	in orbit	
Kosmos 1359	Strela-1M	6 May 1982; 18:07	Kosmos-3M 11K65M	Communication	in orbit	
Kosmos 1360	Strela-1M	6 May 1982; 18:07	Kosmos-3M 11K65M	Communication	in orbit	
Kosmos 1361	Strela-1M	6 May 1982; 18:07	Kosmos-3M 11K65M	Communication	in orbit	
Kosmos 1362	Strela-1M	6 May 1982; 18:07	Kosmos-3M 11K65M	Communication	in orbit	
Kosmos 1363	Strela-1M	6 May 1982; 18:07	Kosmos-3M 11K65M	Communication	in orbit	
Kosmos 1364	Strela-1M	6 May 1982; 18:07	Kosmos-3M 11K65M	Communication	in orbit	
Kosmos 1365	US-A	14 May 1982; 19:39	Tsyklon-2 11K69	Reconnaissance	19 October 1982	
Kosmos 1366	Potok	17 May 1982; 23:50	Proton-K/DM 8K72K	Communication	in orbit	
Kosmos 1367	US-K	20 May 1982; 13:09	Molniya-M 8K78M	Missile defense	in orbit	
Kosmos 1368	Zenit-6	21 May 1982; 12:40	Soyuz-U 11A511U	Reconnaissance	3 June 1982	
Kosmos 1369	Resurs-F1	25 May 1982; 09:00	Soyuz-U 11A511U	Remote sensing	8 June 1982	
Kosmos 1370	Yantar-1KFT	28 May 1982; 09:10	Soyuz-U 11A511U	Reconnaissance	11 July 1982	
Kosmos 1371	Strela-2	1 June 1982; 04:37	Kosmos-3M 11K65M	Communication	in orbit	
Kosmos 1372	US-A	1 June 1982; 13:58	Tsyklon-2 11K69	Reconnaissance	9 September 1982	
Kosmos 1373	Zenit-6	2 June 1982; 12:50	Soyuz-U 11A511U	Reconnaissance	16 June 1982	
Kosmos 1374	BOR-4	3 June 1982; 21:30	Kosmos-3MRB 11K65M-RB	Spaceplane test.	3 June 1982	Kapustin Yar launch. Orbit 158 x 204 km. Inclination 50.7 degrees. Mass-possibly 1 tonne. Recovered after 1 orbit, in the Indian Ocean. First orbital test of the BOR-4 prototype spaceplane.
Kosmos 1375	Lira	6 June 1982; 17:10	Kosmos-3M 11K65M	ASAT target	18 June 1982*	Last of ten Lira satellites, intercepted and destroyed by Kosmos 1379, final DS satellite
Kosmos 1376	Resurs-F1	8 June 1982; 07:45	Soyuz-U 11A511U	Remote sensing	22 June 1982	
Kosmos 1377	Yantar-4K1	8 June 1982; 12:00	Soyuz-U 11A511U	Reconnaissance	22 July 1982	
Kosmos 1378	Tselina-D	10 June 1982; 17:37	Tsyklon-3 11K68	ELINT	in orbit	
Kosmos 1379	IS-A	18 June 1982; 11:04	Tsyklon-2 11K69	ASAT test	18 June 1982*	Last Soviet ASAT test, destroyed Kosmos 1375
Kosmos 1380	Parus	18 June 1982; 11:58	Kosmos-3M 11K65M	Navigation, Communication	27 June 1982	
Kosmos 1381	Zenit-6	18 June 1982; 13:00	Soyuz-U 11A511U	Reconnaissance	1 July 1982	
Kosmos 1382	US-K	25 June 1982; 02:28	Molniya-M 8K78M	Missile defense	in orbit	
Kosmos 1383	Nadezhda	29 June 1982; 21:45	Kosmos-3M 11K65M	SARSAT tests.	in orbit	Plesetsk launch. Orbit 964 x 1010 km. Inclination 83 degrees. Test of SARSAT (Search And Rescue Satellite).
Kosmos 1384	Yantar-2K	30 June 1982; 15:00	Soyuz-U 11A511U	Reconnaissance	30 July 1982	
Kosmos 1385	Zenit-6	6 July 1982; 07:50	Soyuz-U 11A511U	Reconnaissance	20 July 1982	
Kosmos 1386	Parus	7 July 1982; 09:47	Kosmos-3M 11K65M	Navigation, Communication	in orbit	
Kosmos 1387	Zenit-4MKT	13 July 1982; 08:00	Soyuz-U 11A511U	Reconnaissance	26 July 1982	
Kosmos 1388	Strela-1M	21 July 1982; 06:31	Kosmos-3M 11K65M	Communication	in orbit	
Kosmos 1389	Strela-1M	21 July 1982; 06:31	Kosmos-3M 11K65M	Communication	in orbit	
Kosmos 1390	Strela-1M	21 July 1982; 06:31	Kosmos-3M 11K65M	Communication	in orbit	
Kosmos 1391	Strela-1M	21 July 1982; 06:31	Kosmos-3M 11K65M	Communication	in orbit	
Kosmos 1392	Strela-1M	21 July 1982; 06:31	Kosmos-3M 11K65M	Communication	in orbit	
Kosmos 1393	Strela-1M	21 July 1982; 06:31	Kosmos-3M 11K65M	Communication	in orbit	
Kosmos 1394	Strela-1M	21 July 1982; 06:31	Kosmos-3M 11K65M	Communication	in orbit	
Kosmos 1395	Strela-1M	21 July 1982; 06:31	Kosmos-3M 11K65M	Communication	in orbit	
Kosmos 1396	Zenit-6	27 July 1982; 12:30	Soyuz-U 11A511U	Reconnaissance	10 August 1982	
Kosmos 1397	Romb	29 July 1982; 19:40	Kosmos-3M 11K65M	Calibration	18 May 1983	
Kosmos 1398	Zenit-4MT	3 August 1982; 11:30	Soyuz-U 11A511U	Reconnaissance	13 August 1982	
Kosmos 1399	Yantar-4K1	4 August 1982; 11:30	Soyuz-U 11A511U	Reconnaissance	16 September 1982	
Kosmos 1400	Tselina-D	5 August 1982; 06:56	Vostok-2M 8A92M	ELINT	13 September 2014	
Kosmos 1401	Resurs-F1	20 August 1982; 09:50	Soyuz-U 11A511U	Remote sensing	3 September 1982	
Kosmos 1402	US-A	30 August 1982; 10:06	Tsyklon-2 11K69	Radar ocean reconnaissance.	23 January 1983	Baikonur launch. Orbit 251 x 264 km. Inclination 65 degrees. Mass-possibly 3,500 kg. Nuclear reactor failed to eject, spacecraft re-entered over the Atlantic Ocean.
Kosmos 1403	Zenit-6	1 September 1982; 09:00	Soyuz-U 11A511U	Reconnaissance	15 September 1982	
Kosmos 1404	Zenit-6	1 September 1982; 11:40	Soyuz-U 11A511U	Reconnaissance	15 September 1982	
Kosmos 1405	US-P	4 September 1982; 17:50	Tsyklon-2 11K69	ELINT	5 February 1984	
Kosmos 1406	Zenit-4MKT	8 September 1982; 10:20	Soyuz-U 11A511U	Reconnaissance	21 September 1982	
Kosmos 1407	Yantar-2K	15 September 1982; 15:30	Soyuz-U 11A511U	Reconnaissance	16 October 1982	
Kosmos 1408	Tselina-D	16 September 1982; 04:55	Tsyklon-3 11K68	ELINT	Destroyed 15 November 2021	
Kosmos 1409	US-K	22 September 1982; 06:23	Molniya-M 8K78M	Missile defense	in orbit	
Kosmos 1410	Geo-IK	24 September 1982; 09:15	Tsyklon-3 11K68	Geodesy	in orbit	Second of new upgraded second series of Soviet geodetic satellites. Carried out study of the shape of the Earth and accurate mapping of the Earth's surface to enable accurate targeting of military missiles.
Kosmos 1411	Zenit-6	30 September 1982; 11:50	Soyuz-U 11A511U	Reconnaissance	14 October 1982	
Kosmos 1412	US-A	2 October 1982; 00:01	Tsyklon-2 11K69	Reconnaissance	4 December 1982	
Kosmos 1413	Glonass	12 October 1982; 14:57	Proton-K/DM-2 8K72K	GLONASS triple launch.	in orbit	Baikonur launch. Orbits 19,064 x 19,080 km. Inclination 64.8 degrees. First triple GLONASS (Global Navigation Satellite System) launch.
Kosmos 1414	Glonass	12 October 1982; 14:57	Proton-K/DM-2 8K72K	GLONASS triple launch.	in orbit	Baikonur launch. Orbits 19,064 x 19,080 km. Inclination 64.8 degrees. First triple GLONASS (Global Navigation Satellite System) launch.
Kosmos 1415	Glonass	12 October 1982; 14:57	Proton-K/DM-2 8K72K	GLONASS triple launch.	in orbit	Baikonur launch. Orbits 19,064 x 19,080 km. Inclination 64.8 degrees. First triple GLONASS (Global Navigation Satellite System) launch.
Kosmos 1416	Zenit-6	14 October 1982; 09:10	Soyuz-U 11A511U	Reconnaissance	28 October 1982	
Kosmos 1417	Parus	19 October 1982; 05:58	Kosmos-3M 11K65M	Navigation, Communication	in orbit	
Kosmos 1418	Taifun-1B	21 October 1982; 14:00	Kosmos-3M 11K65M	Radar target	30 September 1983	
Kosmos 1419	Zenit-6	2 November 1982; 09:30	Soyuz-U 11A511U	Reconnaissance	16 November 1982	
Kosmos 1420	Strela-2	11 November 1982; 06:14	Kosmos-3M 11K65M	Communication	in orbit	
Kosmos 1421	Zenit-6	18 November 1982; 09:25	Soyuz-U 11A511U	Reconnaissance	2 December 1982	
Kosmos 1422	Zenit-6	3 December 1982; 12:00	Soyuz-U 11A511U	Reconnaissance	17 December 1982	
Kosmos 1423	Molniya-1	8 December 1982; 13:46	Molniya-M 8K78M	Communication	18 January 1986	Disintegrated when the Molniya Block L stage ignited to take the payloads out of low Earth orbit into planned eccentric Molniya-class orbit.Broke up on launch day.
Kosmos 1424	Yantar-4K1	16 December 1982; 10:00	Soyuz-U 11A511U	Reconnaissance	28 January 1983	
Kosmos 1425	Zenit-6	23 December 1982; 09:10	Soyuz-U2 11A511U2	Reconnaissance	6 January 1983	
Kosmos 1426	Yantar-4KS1	28 December 1982; 12:00	Soyuz-U 11A511U	Reconnaissance	5 March 1983	
Kosmos 1427	Taifun-1B	29 December 1982; 12:00	Kosmos-3M 11K65M	Radar target	5 October 1989	
Kosmos 1428	Parus	12 January 1983; 14:02	Kosmos-3M 11K65M	Navigation, Communication	in orbit	
Kosmos 1429	Strela-1M	19 January 1983; 02:25	Kosmos-3M 11K65M	Communication	in orbit	
Kosmos 1430	Strela-1M	19 January 1983; 02:25	Kosmos-3M 11K65M	Communication	in orbit	
Kosmos 1431	Strela-1M	19 January 1983; 02:25	Kosmos-3M 11K65M	Communication	in orbit	
Kosmos 1432	Strela-1M	19 January 1983; 02:25	Kosmos-3M 11K65M	Communication	in orbit	
Kosmos 1433	Strela-1M	19 January 1983; 02:25	Kosmos-3M 11K65M	Communication	in orbit	
Kosmos 1434	Strela-1M	19 January 1983; 02:25	Kosmos-3M 11K65M	Communication	in orbit	
Kosmos 1435	Strela-1M	19 January 1983; 02:25	Kosmos-3M 11K65M	Communication	in orbit	
Kosmos 1436	Strela-1M	19 January 1983; 02:25	Kosmos-3M 11K65M	Communication	in orbit	
Kosmos 1437	Tselina-D	20 January 1983; 17:26	Vostok-2M 8A92M	ELINT	4 January 2022	Reentry at South Region, Brazil.
Kosmos 1438	Zenit-6	27 January 1983; 08:30	Soyuz-U 11A511U	Reconnaissance	7 February 1983	
Kosmos 1439	Yantar-2K	6 February 1983; 11:31	Soyuz-U 11A511U	Reconnaissance	22 February 1983	
Kosmos 1440	Resurs-F1	10 February 1983; 07:15	Soyuz-U 11A511U	Remote sensing	24 February 1983	
Kosmos 1441	Tselina-D	16 February 1983; 10:03	Vostok-2M 8A92M	ELINT	8 November 2014	
Kosmos 1442	Yantar-4K1	25 February 1983; 12:45	Soyuz-U 11A511U	Reconnaissance	11 April 1983	
Kosmos 1443	TKS-M	2 March 1983; 09:37	Proton-K 8K72K	Large space station module addition to Salyut 7.	19 September 1983	Baikonur launch. Orbit 325 x 327 km. Inclination 52 degrees. Docked with Salyut 7 eight days after launch. Used by Soyuz T-9 crew from 30 Jun 1983 to 14 Aug 1983. Re-entry capsule component returned 350 kg of cargo to earth on 23 Aug 1983. De-orbit burn-up of rest of Kosmos 1443 on 19 Sep 1983.
Kosmos 1444	Zenit-6	2 March 1983; 10:50	Soyuz-U 11A511U	Reconnaissance	16 March 1983	
Kosmos 1445	BOR-4	15 March 1983; 22:30	Kosmos-3MRB 11K65M-RB	Spaceplane test.	16 March 1983	Second orbital test of the BOR-4 prototype spaceplane. First photograph of a BOR-4 craft seen by the rest of the world, taken in the Indian Ocean after splashdown, by the Australian Air Force.
Kosmos 1446	Zenit-6	16 March 1983; 08:50	Soyuz-U 11A511U	Reconnaissance	30 March 1983	
Kosmos 1447	Nadezhda	24 March 1983; 20:55	Kosmos-3M 11K65M	Navigation, Technology	in orbit	
Kosmos 1448	Parus	30 March 1983; 01:10	Kosmos-3M 11K65M	Navigation, Communication	in orbit	
Kosmos 1449	Zenit-6	31 March 1983; 10:50	Soyuz-U 11A511U	Reconnaissance	15 April 1983	
Kosmos 1450	Taifun-1	6 April 1983; 12:00	Kosmos-3M 11K65M	Radar target	30 May 1990	
Kosmos 1451	Zenit-6	8 April 1983; 08:30	Soyuz-U 11A511U	Reconnaissance	22 April 1983	
Kosmos 1452	Strela-2	12 April 1983; 18:20	Kosmos-3M 11K65M	Communication	in orbit	
Kosmos 1453	Romb	19 April 1983; 12:00	Kosmos-3M 11K65M	Calibration	8 May 1989	
Kosmos 1454	Yantar-2K	22 April 1983; 14:30	Soyuz-U 11A511U	Reconnaissance	22 May 1983	
Kosmos 1455	Tselina-D	23 April 1983; 14:30	Tsyklon-3 11K68	ELINT	in orbit	
Kosmos 1456	US-K	25 April 1983; 19:34	Molniya-M 8K78M	Missile defense	13 Aug 1983	Self-Destructed. Main piece reentered on 11 May 1998.
Kosmos 1457	Yantar-4K1	26 April 1983; 10:00	Soyuz-U 11A511U	Reconnaissance	8 June 1983	
Kosmos 1458	Zenit-4MKT	28 April 1983; 08:30	Soyuz-U 11A511U	Reconnaissance	11 May 1983	
Kosmos 1459	Parus	6 May 1983; 03:00	Kosmos-3M 11K65M	Navigation, Communication	in orbit	
Kosmos 1460	Zenit-6	6 May 1983; 09:10	Soyuz-U 11A511U	Reconnaissance	20 May 1983	
Kosmos 1461	US-P	7 May 1983; 10:30	Tsyklon-2 11K69	ELINT	in orbit	
Kosmos 1462	Resurs-F1	17 May 1983; 08:00	Soyuz-U 11A511U	Remote sensing	31 May 1983	
Kosmos 1463	Taifun-1B	19 May 1983; 12:00	Kosmos-3M 11K65M	Radar target	24 January 1993	
Kosmos 1464	Parus	24 May 1983; 02:59	Kosmos-3M 11K65M	Navigation, Communication	in orbit	
Kosmos 1465	Romb	26 May 1983; 05:00	Kosmos-3M 11K65M	Calibration	23 January 1985	
Kosmos 1466	Yantar-4K1	26 May 1983; 12:00	Soyuz-U 11A511U	Reconnaissance	6 July 1983	
Kosmos 1467	Zenit-6	31 May 1983; 11:40	Soyuz-U 11A511U	Reconnaissance	12 June 1983	
Kosmos 1468	Resurs-F1	7 June 1983; 07:50	Soyuz-U 11A511U	Remote sensing	21 June 1983	
Kosmos 1469	Zenit-6	14 June 1983; 12:15	Soyuz-U 11A511U	Reconnaissance	24 June 1983	
Kosmos 1470	Tselina-D	22 June 1983; 23:58	Tsyklon-3 11K68	ELINT	in orbit	
Kosmos 1471	Yantar-2K	28 June 1983; 15:00	Soyuz-U 11A511U	Reconnaissance	28 July 1983	
Kosmos 1472	Zenit-6	5 July 1983; 07:50	Soyuz-U 11A511U	Reconnaissance	19 July 1983	
Kosmos 1473	Strela-1M	6 July 1983; 00:31	Kosmos-3M 11K65M	Communication	in orbit	
Kosmos 1474	Strela-1M	6 July 1983; 00:31	Kosmos-3M 11K65M	Communication	in orbit	
Kosmos 1475	Strela-1M	6 July 1983; 00:31	Kosmos-3M 11K65M	Communication	in orbit	
Kosmos 1476	Strela-1M	6 July 1983; 00:31	Kosmos-3M 11K65M	Communication	in orbit	
Kosmos 1477	Strela-1M	6 July 1983; 00:31	Kosmos-3M 11K65M	Communication	in orbit	
Kosmos 1478	Strela-1M	6 July 1983; 00:31	Kosmos-3M 11K65M	Communication	in orbit	
Kosmos 1479	Strela-1M	6 July 1983; 00:31	Kosmos-3M 11K65M	Communication	in orbit	
Kosmos 1480	Strela-1M	6 July 1983; 00:31	Kosmos-3M 11K65M	Communication	in orbit	
Kosmos 1481	US-K	8 July 1983; 19:21	Molniya-M 8K78M	Missile defense	9 July 1983	Self-Destructed. All Debris still in orbit.
Kosmos 1482	Zenit-6	13 July 1983; 09:40	Soyuz-U 11A511U	Reconnaissance	27 July 1983	
Kosmos 1483	Resurs-F1	20 July 1983; 08:00	Soyuz-U 11A511U	Remote sensing	3 August 1983	
Kosmos 1484	Resurs-OE	24 July 1983; 05:30	Vostok-2M 8A92M	Experimental natural resources satellite. Contained multi-spectral imaging systems.	28 January 2013, 02:30 UTC	Baikonur launch. Orbit 593 x 661 km. Inclination 98 degrees. Fifth USSR Sun-synchronous satellite.
Kosmos 1485	Zenit-6	26 July 1983; 12:00	Soyuz-U 11A511U	Reconnaissance	9 August 1983	
Kosmos 1486	Strela-2	3 August 1983; 12:40	Kosmos-3M 11K65M	Communication	in orbit	
Kosmos 1487	Resurs-F1	5 August 1983; 09:20	Soyuz-U 11A511U	Remote sensing	19 August 1983	
Kosmos 1488	Zenit-6	9 August 1983; 11:20	Soyuz-U 11A511U	Reconnaissance	23 August 1983	
Kosmos 1489	Yantar-4K1	10 August 1983; 13:00	Soyuz-U 11A511U	Reconnaissance	23 September 1983	
Kosmos 1490	Glonass	10 August 1983; 18:24	Proton-K/DM-2 8K72K	Navigation	in orbit	
Kosmos 1491	Glonass	10 August 1983; 18:24	Proton-K/DM-2 8K72K	Navigation	in orbit	
Kosmos 1492	Glonass	10 August 1983; 18:24	Proton-K/DM-2 8K72K	Navigation	in orbit	
Kosmos 1493	Zenit-6	23 August 1983; 11:05	Soyuz-U 11A511U	Reconnaissance	6 September 1983	
Kosmos 1494	Romb	31 August 1983; 06:30	Kosmos-3M 11K65M	Calibration	26 September 1985	
Kosmos 1495	Zenit-4MKT	3 September 1983; 10:15	Soyuz-U 11A511U	Reconnaissance	16 September 1983	
Kosmos 1496	Yantar-4K1	7 September 1983; 13:24	Soyuz-U 11A511U	Reconnaissance	19 October 1983	
Kosmos 1497	Zenit-6	9 September 1983; 11:00	Soyuz-U 11A511U	Reconnaissance	23 September 1983	
Kosmos 1498	Resurs-F1	14 September 1983; 10:25	Soyuz-U 11A511U	Remote sensing	29 September 1983	
Kosmos 1499	Zenit-6	17 September 1983; 11:15	Soyuz-U 11A511U	Reconnaissance	1 October 1983	
Kosmos 1500	Okean-OE	28 September 1983; 07:59	Tsyklon-3 11K68	Ocean Surveillance.	in orbit	Plesetsk launch. Orbit 634 x 679 km. Inclination 82.6 degrees. First USSR satellite equipped with SLSR (Side-looking Satellite Radar)-Resolution 1.5-2.0 km, Swath Width 450–500 km. Used for ocean surface observations. In December 1983 data from Kosmos 1500 was used to map escape routes for a lot of Soviet ships trapped in heavy Arctic ice in the De Long Straits near Wrangel Island. Kosmos 1500 provided images of Typhoon Ida near the coast of Japan showing the structure of the waves. Pictures also showed an apparent oil slick greater than 300 km extended from Tokyo Bay.

* — satellite was destroyed in orbit rather than decaying and burning up in the Earth's atmosphere

== See also ==
- List of USA satellites
