= Kosmos 1409 =

Soviet military early warning satellite

- Names: Космос 1409
- Mission type: Early warning system
- Operator: Russian Strategic Nuclear Forces
- COSPAR ID: 1982-095A
- SATCAT no.: 13585
- Mission duration: 4 years (achieved)

Spacecraft properties
- Spacecraft type: Oko No. 6008
- Bus: US-K
- Launch mass: 2,400 kg (5,300 lb)
- Dry mass: 1,250 kg (2,760 lb)
- Dimensions: 2 m (6 ft 7 in) long and 1.7 m (5 ft 7 in) diameter

Start of mission
- Launch date: 22 September 1982, 06:23:11 UTC
- Rocket: Molniya-M / Blok 2BL
- Launch site: Plesetsk, Site 16/2
- Contractor: TsSKB-Progress
- Entered service: 22 September 1982

End of mission
- Deactivated: 5 January 1987
- Decay date: 8 June 2009

Orbital parameters
- Reference system: Geocentric orbit
- Regime: Molniya orbit
- Slot: 2
- Perigee altitude: 613 km (381 mi)
- Apogee altitude: 39,340 km (24,440 mi)
- Inclination: 62.80°
- Period: 709.00 minutes

Instruments
- Telescope

Kosmos 1409 (Russian: Космос 1409 meaning Cosmos 1409) was a Soviet US-K missile early warning satellite which was launched in 1982 as part of the Soviet military's Oko programme. Kosmos 1409 replaced Kosmos 1217 as part of the Oko constellation of satellites and covered the plane 2 - 317° longitude of ascending node.

== Mission ==
The satellite was designed to identify missile launches using optical telescopes and infrared sensors.

== Launch ==
Kosmos 1409 was launched from Site 16/2 from Plesetsk Cosmodrome in Soviet Union. A Molniya-M launch vehicle with a Blok 2BL upper stage was used to perform the launch, which took place at 06:23:11 UTC on 22 September 1982. The launch successfully placed the satellite into a Molniya orbit. It subsequently received its Kosmos designation, and the COSPAR International Designator 1982-095A. The United States Space Command assigned it the Satellite Catalog Number 13585.

== Atmospheric entry ==
It reentered the Earth's atmosphere on 8 June 2009.

== See also ==
- List of Kosmos satellites (1251–1500)
- List of R-7 launches (1980-1984)
- 1982 in spaceflight
- List of Oko satellites
