= Kosmos 1481 =

Soviet military early warning satellite

- Mission type: Early warning
- COSPAR ID: 1983-070A
- SATCAT no.: 14182
- Mission duration: 4 years

Spacecraft properties
- Spacecraft type: US-K
- Launch mass: 1,900 kilograms (4,200 lb)

Start of mission
- Launch date: 8 July 1983, 19:21 UTC
- Rocket: Molniya-M/2BL
- Launch site: Plesetsk Cosmodrome

End of mission
- Deactivated: 9 July 1983

Orbital parameters
- Reference system: Geocentric
- Regime: Molniya
- Perigee altitude: 689 kilometres (428 mi)
- Apogee altitude: 39,147 kilometres (24,325 mi)
- Inclination: 62.9 degrees
- Period: 707.31 minutes

Kosmos 1481 (Russian: Космос 1481 meaning Cosmos 1481) was a Soviet US-K missile early warning satellite which was launched in 1983 as part of the Soviet military's Oko programme. The satellite was designed to identify missile launches using optical telescopes and infrared sensors.

Kosmos 1481 was launched from Site 43/3 at Plesetsk Cosmodrome in the Russian SSR. A Molniya-M carrier rocket with a 2BL upper stage was used to perform the launch, which took place at 19:21 UTC on 8 July 1983. The launch successfully placed the satellite into a molniya orbit. It subsequently received its Kosmos designation, and the international designator 1983-070A. The United States Space Command assigned it the Satellite Catalog Number 14182.

This satellite did not reach its working orbit and self-destructed. As well as its main entry this satellite has cataloged debris such as:

COSPAR	Satcat
1983-070E	14192
1983-070F	20412
1983-070G	26633
1983-070H	27906
1983-070J	27907
1983-070K	33531

Kosmos 1481 was the 12th US-K satellite like Kosmos 862 to self-destruct, NASA believes intentionally. The event occurred within a day of launch. An expected orbital maneuver by Kosmos 1481 to move from its transfer orbit to an operational orbit about three days after launch was never performed. All of its trackable debris is still in orbit.

== See also ==
- 1983 in spaceflight
- List of Kosmos satellites (1251–1500)
- List of Oko satellites
- List of R-7 launches (1980–1984)
