= Progress 14 =

Soviet unmanned Progress cargo spacecraft

- A Progress 7K-TG spacecraft
- Mission type: Salyut 7 resupply
- COSPAR ID: 1982-070A
- SATCAT no.: 13361

Spacecraft properties
- Spacecraft: Progress (No.117)
- Spacecraft type: Progress 7K-TG
- Manufacturer: NPO Energia

Start of mission
- Launch date: 10 July 1982, 09:57:44 UTC
- Rocket: Soyuz-U
- Launch site: Baikonur, Site 1/5

End of mission
- Disposal: Deorbited
- Decay date: 13 August 1982, 01:29 UTC

Orbital parameters
- Reference system: Geocentric
- Regime: Low Earth
- Perigee altitude: 301 km
- Apogee altitude: 325 km
- Inclination: 51.6°
- Period: 90.7 minutes
- Epoch: 10 July 1982

Docking with Salyut 7
- Docking port: Aft
- Docking date: 12 July 1982, 11:41 UTC
- Undocking date: 10 August 1982, 22:11 UTC

Progress 14 (Russian: Прогресс 14) was a Soviet uncrewed Progress cargo spacecraft, which was launched in July 1982 to resupply the Salyut 7 space station.

== Spacecraft ==
Progress 14 was a Progress 7K-TG spacecraft. The 14th of forty three to be launched, it had the serial number 117. The Progress 7K-TG spacecraft was the first generation Progress, derived from the Soyuz 7K-T and intended for uncrewed logistics missions to space stations in support of the Salyut programme. On some missions the spacecraft were also used to adjust the orbit of the space station.

The Progress spacecraft had a dry mass of 6,520 kilograms (14,370 lb), which increased to around 7,020 kilograms (15,480 lb) when fully fuelled. It measured 7.48 metres (24.5 ft) in length, and 2.72 metres (8 ft 11 in) in diameter. Each spacecraft could accommodate up to 2,500 kilograms (5,500 lb) of payload, consisting of dry cargo and propellant. The spacecraft were powered by chemical batteries, and could operate in free flight for up to three days, remaining docked to the station for up to thirty.

== Launch ==
Progress 14 launched on 10 July 1982 from the Baikonur Cosmodrome in the Kazakh SSR. It used a Soyuz-U rocket.

== Docking ==
Progress 14 docked with the aft port of Salyut 7 on 12 July 1982 at 11:41 UTC, and was undocked on 10 August 1982 at 22:11 UTC.

== Decay ==
It remained in orbit until 13 August 1982, when it was deorbited. The deorbit burn occurred at 01:29 UTC, with the mission ending at around 02:15 UTC.

== See also ==
- 1982 in spaceflight
- List of Progress missions
- List of uncrewed spaceflights to Salyut space stations
