= Kosmos 1484 =

Soviet prototype earth imaging satellite

- Mission type: Technology; Earth observation
- COSPAR ID: 1983-075A
- SATCAT no.: 14207

Spacecraft properties
- Spacecraft type: Resurs-OE
- Bus: Meteor

Start of mission
- Launch date: 24 July 1983, 05:30:37 UTC
- Rocket: Vostok-2M
- Launch site: Baikonur 31/6

End of mission
- Decay date: 28 January 2013

Orbital parameters
- Reference system: Geocentric
- Regime: Sun-synchronous
- Perigee altitude: 593 kilometres (368 mi)
- Apogee altitude: 639 kilometres (397 mi)
- Inclination: 98.0 degrees
- Period: 97.22 minutes
- Epoch: 25 August 1983

Kosmos 1484 (Russian: Космос 1484 meaning Cosmos 1484), also known as Resurs-OE No.3-2 was a Soviet prototype Earth imaging satellite, launched in 1983 as part of the Resurs programme. It was a prototype of the Meteor-derived Resurs-O1 spacecraft, which paved the way for the first Resurs-O1 to fly in October 1985.

Kosmos 1484 was launched at 05:30:37 UTC on July 24, 1983. A Vostok-2M carrier rocket was used to place the satellite into low Earth orbit. The launch was conducted from Site 31/6 at the Baikonur Cosmodrome. Following the successful launch, the satellite was assigned its Kosmos designation, and was also given the International Designator 1983-075A, and the Satellite Catalog Number 14207.

Following the completion of its mission, Kosmos 1484 remained in orbit for several years as [[space debris]|a derelict satellite]]. It suffered a fragmentation event - possibly due to a battery explosion - on October 18, 1993; however, the spacecraft remained relatively intact. Its orbit decayed and the main component of it reentered Earth's atmosphere on January 28, 2013. The American Meteor Society reported that its re-entry fireball was witnessed over the eastern United States, with sightings from New York state to Georgia.

Most of the rest of Kosmos 1484 has also decayed but as of 2023, at least one fragment - 1983-075BG - remains.

== See also ==
- List of Kosmos satellites (1251–1500)
