= Intelsat V F-5 =

Geostationary communications satellite

- Mission type: Communication
- Operator: COMSAT / INTELSAT
- COSPAR ID: 1982-097A
- SATCAT no.: 13595
- Mission duration: 7 years (planned)

Spacecraft properties
- Bus: Intelsat V
- Manufacturer: Ford Aerospace
- Launch mass: 1928 kg
- Dry mass: 1012 kg
- Dimensions: 1.66 x 2.1 x 1.77 metres
- Power: 1800 watts

Start of mission
- Launch date: 28 September 1982, 23:17:00 UTC
- Rocket: Atlas SLV-3D Centaur-D1AR (AC-60)
- Launch site: CCAFS, LC-36B
- Contractor: General Dynamics

End of mission
- Disposal: Graveyard orbit
- Deactivated: August 1999

Orbital parameters
- Reference system: Geocentric orbit
- Regime: Geostationary orbit
- Longitude: 63.0° East (1982-1992); 66.0° East (1992-1994); 65.0° East (1994-1996); 33.0° East (1996-1997); 72.0° East (1997-1999)
- Epoch: 28 September 1982

Transponders
- Band: 21 C-band; 4 Ku-band

Intelsat V F-5 was a communications satellite operated by COMSAT. Launched in 1982, it was the fifth of fifteen Intelsat V satellites to be launched. The Intelsat V series was constructed by Ford Aerospace, based on the Intelsat V satellite bus. Intelsat V F-5 was part of an advanced series of satellites designed to provide greater telecommunications capacity for Intelsat's global network.

== Satellite ==
The Intelsat V F-5 satellite was box-shaped, measuring 1.66 by 2.1 by 1.77 metres; solar arrays spanned 15.9 metres tip to tip. The arrays, supplemented by nickel-hydrogen batteries during eclipse, provided 1800 watts of power. The payload housed 21 C-band and 4 Ku-band transponders. It could accommodate 15,000 two-way voice circuits and two TV channels simultaneously. It had a launch mass of 1928 kg. It also carried a Maritime Communications Services (MCS) package for INMARSAT. It cost $87 million (equivalent to $283,470,000 in 2024) and was the 32nd satellite launched by Intelsat. The satellite was deactivated in August 1999.

== Launch ==
The Intelsat V F-5 satellite was successfully launched into space on 28 September 1982 at 23:17:00 UTC, by means of an Atlas SLV-3D Centaur-D1AR vehicle from the Cape Canaveral Air Force Station, Florida, United States. The launch was originally scheduled for the night of 23 September 1982 but was postponed to 28 October due to a power supply failure in another, identical, satellite. It was launched on 28 September after engineers found the issue was not caused by a design flaw in the satellite. The launch window was from 19:08–21:03 EST.

== See also ==
- 1982 in spaceflight
