= Kosmos 1164 =

Russian military early warning satellite

- Mission type: Early warning
- COSPAR ID: 1980-013A
- SATCAT no.: 11700
- Mission duration: 4 years (planned); Launch failure

Spacecraft properties
- Spacecraft type: US-K
- Launch mass: 1,900 kilograms (4,200 lb)

Start of mission
- Launch date: 12 February 1980, 00:53 UTC
- Rocket: Molniya-M/2BL
- Launch site: Plesetsk Cosmodrome

End of mission
- Decay date: 12 February 1980

Orbital parameters
- Reference system: Geocentric
- Regime: Low Earth orbit
- Perigee altitude: 212 kilometres (132 mi)
- Apogee altitude: 578 kilometres (359 mi)
- Inclination: 62.8 degrees
- Period: 92.45 minutes

Kosmos 1164 (Russian: Космос 1164 meaning Cosmos 1164) was a Soviet US-K missile early warning satellite which was launched in 1980 as part of the Soviet military's Oko programme. The satellite was designed to identify missile launches using optical telescopes and infrared sensors, however due to a launch failure, it was never used for the purpose.

Kosmos 1164 was launched from Site 43/4 at Plesetsk Cosmodrome in the Russian SSR. A Molniya-M carrier rocket with a 2BL upper stage was used to perform the launch, which took place at 00:53 UTC on 12 February 1980. The launch was unsuccessful and placed the satellite into low Earth orbit rather than the intended molniya orbit. It subsequently received its Kosmos designation, and the international designator 1980-013A. The United States Space Command assigned it the Satellite Catalog Number 11700.

It re-entered the Earth's atmosphere on 12 February 1980, the same day it was launched.

== See also ==
- List of Kosmos satellites (1001–1250)
- List of R-7 launches (1980-1984)
- 1980 in spaceflight
- List of Oko satellites
