= Kosmos 1456 =

Soviet military early warning satellite

- Mission type: Early warning
- COSPAR ID: 1983-038A
- SATCAT no.: 14034
- Mission duration: 4 years

Spacecraft properties
- Spacecraft type: US-K
- Launch mass: 1,900 kilograms (4,200 lb)

Start of mission
- Launch date: 25 April 1983, 19:34 UTC
- Rocket: Molniya-M/2BL
- Launch site: Plesetsk Cosmodrome

End of mission
- Deactivated: 3 August 1983
- Decay date: 11 May 1998

Orbital parameters
- Reference system: Geocentric
- Regime: Molniya
- Perigee altitude: 651 kilometres (405 mi)
- Apogee altitude: 39,710 kilometres (24,670 mi)
- Inclination: 63.0 degrees
- Period: 717.92 minutes

Kosmos 1456 (Russian: Космос 1456 meaning Cosmos 1456) was a Soviet US-K missile early warning satellite which was launched in 1983 as part of the Soviet military's Oko programme. The satellite was designed to identify missile launches using optical telescopes and infrared sensors.

Kosmos 1456 was launched from Site 16/2 at Plesetsk Cosmodrome in the Russian SSR. A Molniya-M carrier rocket with a 2BL upper stage was used to perform the launch, which took place at 19:34 UTC on 25 April 1983. The launch successfully placed the satellite into a molniya orbit. It subsequently received its Kosmos designation, and the international designator 1983-038A. The United States Space Command assigned it the Satellite Catalog Number 14034.

Kosmos 1456 was a US-K satellite like Kosmos 862 that self-destructed in orbit, NASA believes deliberately. The spacecraft may have been active when it self-destructed on 13 August 1983, having last made a station-keeping maneuver on 22 June 1983. The next station-keeping maneuver was expected in the second half of August or early September 1983. The spacecraft began drifting off station immediately after the event and never recovered.. All of its traceable debris re-entered the Earth's atmosphere by 11 May 1998.

== See also ==
- 1983 in spaceflight
- List of Kosmos satellites (1251–1500)
- List of Oko satellites
- List of R-7 launches (1980-1984)
