= Progress 16 =

Soviet unmanned Progress cargo spacecraft

- A Progress 7K-TG spacecraft
- Mission type: Salyut 7 resupply
- COSPAR ID: 1982-107A
- SATCAT no.: 13638

Spacecraft properties
- Spacecraft: Progress (No.115)
- Spacecraft type: Progress 7K-TG
- Manufacturer: NPO Energia

Start of mission
- Launch date: 31 October 1982, 11:20:36 UTC
- Rocket: Soyuz-U
- Launch site: Baikonur, Site 1/5

End of mission
- Disposal: Deorbited
- Decay date: 14 December 1982, 17:17 UTC

Orbital parameters
- Reference system: Geocentric
- Regime: Low Earth
- Perigee altitude: 186 km
- Apogee altitude: 246 km
- Inclination: 51.6°
- Period: 88.8 minutes
- Epoch: 31 October 1982

Docking with Salyut 7
- Docking port: Aft
- Docking date: 2 November 1982, 13:22 UTC
- Undocking date: 13 December 1982, 15:32 UTC

Progress 16 (Russian: Прогресс 16) was a Soviet uncrewed Progress cargo spacecraft, which was launched in October 1982 to resupply the Salyut 7 space station.

== Spacecraft ==
Progress 16 was a Progress 7K-TG spacecraft. The 16th of forty three to be launched, it had the serial number 115. The Progress 7K-TG spacecraft was the first generation Progress, derived from the Soyuz 7K-T and intended for uncrewed logistics missions to space stations in support of the Salyut programme. On some missions the spacecraft were also used to adjust the orbit of the space station.

The Progress spacecraft had a dry mass of 6,520 kilograms (14,370 lb), which increased to around 7,020 kilograms (15,480 lb) when fully fuelled. It measured 7.48 metres (24.5 ft) in length, and 2.72 metres (8 ft 11 in) in diameter. Each spacecraft could accommodate up to 2,500 kilograms (5,500 lb) of payload, consisting of dry cargo and propellant. The spacecraft were powered by chemical batteries, and could operate in free flight for up to three days, remaining docked to the station for up to thirty.

== Launch ==
Progress 16 launched on 31 October 1982 from the Baikonur Cosmodrome in the Kazakh Soviet Socialist Republic. It used a Soyuz-U launch vehicle.

== Docking ==
Progress 16 docked with the aft port of Salyut 7 on 2 November 1982 at 13:22 UTC, and was undocked on 13 December 1982 at 15:32 UTC.

== Decay ==
It remained in orbit until 14 December 1982, when it was deorbited. The deorbit burn occurred at 17:17 UTC, with the mission ending around 18:00 UTC.

== See also ==
- 1982 in spaceflight
- List of Progress missions
- List of uncrewed spaceflights to Salyut space stations
