= Intelsat V F-4 =

Geostationary communications satellite

- Mission type: Communication
- Operator: COMSAT / INTELSAT
- COSPAR ID: 1982-017A
- SATCAT no.: 13083
- Mission duration: 7 years (planned)

Spacecraft properties
- Bus: Intelsat V
- Manufacturer: Ford Aerospace
- Launch mass: 1928 kg
- Dry mass: 1012 kg
- Dimensions: 1.66 x 2.1 x 1.77 metres
- Power: 1800 watts

Start of mission
- Launch date: 5 March 1982, 00:23:00 UTC
- Rocket: Atlas SLV-3D Centaur-D1AR (AC-58)
- Launch site: Cape Canaveral, LC-36A
- Contractor: General Dynamics

End of mission
- Disposal: Graveyard orbit
- Deactivated: November 1995

Orbital parameters
- Reference system: Geocentric orbit
- Regime: Geostationary orbit
- Longitude: 34.5° West (1982-1993); 40.5° West (1993-1994); 31.5° West (1994-1995); 29.4° West (1995-1995)
- Epoch: 5 March 1982

Transponders
- Band: 21 C-band; 4 Ku-band

Intelsat V-D (F-4) was a communications satellite operated by COMSAT. Launched in 1982, it was the fourth of fifteen Intelsat V satellites to be launched. The Intelsat V series was constructed by Ford Aerospace, based on the Intelsat V satellite bus. Intelsat V F-4 was part of an advanced series of satellites designed to provide greater telecommunications capacity for Intelsat's global network.

== Satellite ==
The Intelsat V F-4 satellite was box-shaped, measuring 1.66 by 2.1 by 1.77 metres; solar arrays spanned 15.9 metres tip to tip. The arrays, supplemented by nickel-hydrogen batteries during eclipse, provided 1800 watts of power. The payload housed 21 C-band and 4 Ku-band transponders. It could accommodate 15,000 two-way voice circuits and two TV channels simultaneously. It had a launch mass of 1928 kg. The satellite was deactivated in November 1995.

== Launch ==
The satellite was successfully launched into space on 5 March 1982 at 00:23:00 UTC (on 4 March 1982 at 19:23:00 local time), by means of an Atlas SLV-3D Centaur-D1AR vehicle from the Cape Canaveral Air Force Station, Florida, United States.

== See also ==
- 1982 in spaceflight
