= Kosmos 1241 =

Soviet anti-satellite weapon test satellite

- Mission type: ASAT target
- COSPAR ID: 1981-006A
- SATCAT no.: 12149

Spacecraft properties
- Spacecraft type: Lira
- Manufacturer: Yuzhnoye
- Launch mass: 650 kilograms (1,430 lb)

Start of mission
- Launch date: 21 January 1981, 08:29 UTC
- Rocket: Kosmos-3M
- Launch site: Plesetsk 132/1

Orbital parameters
- Reference system: Geocentric
- Regime: Low Earth
- Perigee altitude: 989 kilometres (615 mi)
- Apogee altitude: 995 kilometres (618 mi)
- Inclination: 65.8 degrees
- Period: 105 minutes

Kosmos 1241 (Russian: Космос 1241 meaning Cosmos 1241) was a target satellite which was used by the Soviet Union in the 1980s for tests of anti-satellite weapons as part of the Istrebitel Sputnikov programme. It was launched in 1981, and was itself part of the Dnepropetrovsk Sputnik programme. It was a target for Kosmos 1243 and Kosmos 1258.

It was launched at 08:29 UTC on 21 January 1981, using a Kosmos-3M carrier rocket, flying from Site 132/1 at the Plesetsk Cosmodrome in Northwest Russia.

Kosmos 1241 was placed into a low Earth orbit with a perigee of 989 kilometres (615 mi), an apogee of 995 kilometres (618 mi), 65.8 degrees of inclination, and an orbital period of 105 minutes. It was intercepted by Kosmos 1243 on 2 February. This was intended to have been a destructive test; however, the explosive charge aboard Kosmos 1243 failed to detonate. Kosmos 1258 attempted to intercept it on 14 March; however, it failed. As of 2009, Kosmos 1241 is still orbiting the Earth.

Kosmos 1241 was the ninth of ten Lira satellites to be launched, of which all but the first were successful. Lira was derived from the earlier DS-P1-M satellite, which it replaced. Kosmos 1241 was also the penultimate satellite to be launched as part of the DS programme, which concluded with Kosmos 1375 in June 1982.

== See also ==
- 1981 in spaceflight
