= Kosmos 1379 =

Soviet-era satellite

Kosmos-1379
- Mission type: ASAT practice launch
- COSPAR ID: 1982-060A
- SATCAT no.: 13281

Spacecraft properties
- Spacecraft type: IS-A
- Manufacturer: TsNII Kometa

Start of mission
- Launch date: 18 June 1982, 11:04 UTC
- Rocket: Tsyklon-2
- Launch site: Baikonur 90

End of mission
- Disposal: Intercepted Kosmos 1375
- Destroyed: 18 June 1982

Orbital parameters
- Reference system: Geocentric
- Regime: Low Earth
- Perigee altitude: 140 kilometres (87 mi)
- Apogee altitude: 542 kilometres (337 mi)
- Inclination: 65 degrees
- Period: 91.35 minutes
- Epoch: 18 June 1982

Kosmos 1379 (Russian: Космос 1379 meaning Cosmos 1379) was a low orbit 'combat' satellite which was used by the Soviet Union on 18 June 1982 as an antisatellite demonstration; an exercise that the United States called a 'seven hour nuclear war'. Kosmos 1379 intercepted and destroyed Kosmos 1375 as a demonstration of Soviet anti-satellite capability. It was the last satellite to be launched as part of the Istrebitel Sputnikov programme.
