= Yantar-2K =

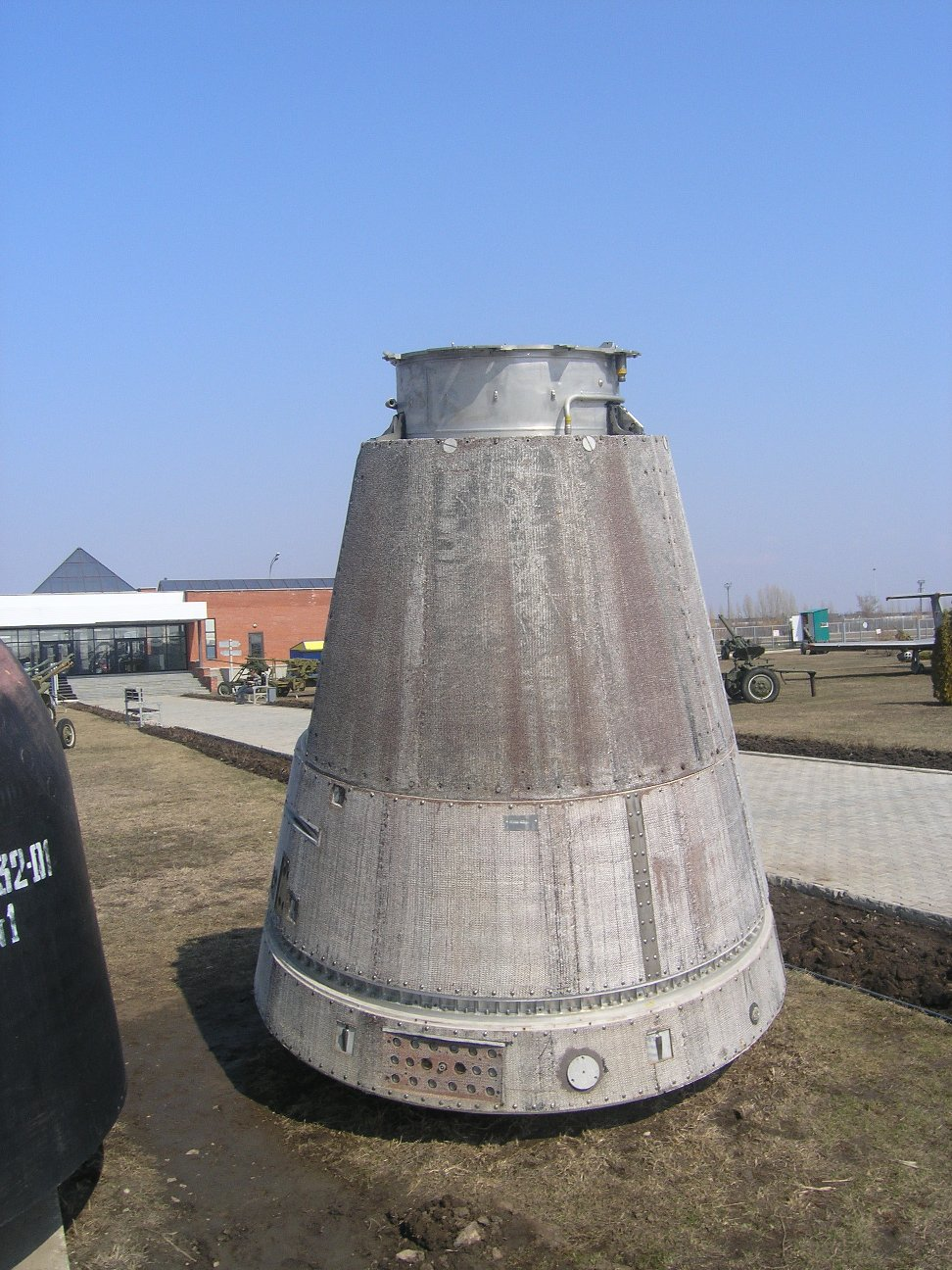
- Spacecraft lander
- Manufacturer: TsSKB
- Country of origin: Soviet Union
- Operator: GRU
- Applications: Reconnaissance satellite

Specifications
- Bus: Yantar
- Launch mass: 6,600 kilograms (14,600 lb)
- Dimensions: 6.5 by 2.7 metres (21.3 ft × 8.9 ft)
- Equipment: Zhemchug-4 camera
- Regime: Low Earth Orbit
- Design life: 30 days

Production
- Status: Retired
- Launched: 30
- Maiden launch: 23 May 1974 (launch failure); 13 December 1974 (Kosmos 697)
- Last launch: 28 June 1983 (Kosmos 1471)

Yantar-2K (Russian: Янтарь meaning amber) was a type of Soviet reconnaissance satellite which supplemented and eventually replaced the Zenit spacecraft. It was the first satellite of the Yantar series and was managed by the Soviet military intelligence agency, the GRU. These satellites were in orbit for 30 days and photographed sites of interest using a film camera. Yantar-2K was proposed in 1967 and had its first test launch in May 1974. It was in military service from 1978 to 1983 and was given the name Feniks (Russian: Феникс), meaning phoenix.

== Equipment ==
Yantar differed from Zenit in that it had to stay in orbit for a month unlike Zenit's 8–14 days. It also had 2 film return capsules, something it had in common with the US KH-7 GAMBIT reconnaissance satellite. Yantar had three parts: the aggregate/equipment module (AO - Agregatnyy Otsek), the instrument module (PO - Pribornnyy Otsek) and the special equipment module/special apparatus module (OSA - otsek spetsialnoy apparatury). The special equipment module was the part that returned to earth at the end of the mission, and contained the Zhemchug-4 (pearl) camera. Each section was shaped like a truncated cone which gave the craft a conical shape. The craft was 6.3m long (although one source says 8.5m) with a maximum diameter of 2.7m. It weighed 6.6 tonnes.

The aggregate module was 1.2m long and 2.7m diameter and contained the propulsion unit. It used UDMH fuel with an N_{2}O_{4} oxidiser. Attached to it were two solar arrays, each six metres long with four panels. The instrument module was 1m long and 2.4m diameter. It contained most of the equipment including Kvadrat gyroscopes, telemetry systems and attitude control. It was covered in thermal radiator panels.

The special equipment module was 3.3m long with a diameter of 2.3m. A shade 2.5m long with a diameter of 0.9m was attached to the front. The module contained the Zhemchug-4 camera, the Salyut-3M computer, film and film handling systems. It also acted as the reentry vehicle. Attached to it were two film return capsules (SpK Spuskayemaya Kapsula) which were 0.8m diameter spheres. They contained retro rockets and could land on the ground or on water. During a thirty-day mission the film return capsules deorbited on the tenth and eighteenth days with the final film returning with the re-entry vehicle.

Space historian Peter Gorin estimates that the camera lens had a diameter of 600mm and a focal length of approximately 3000mm to 4000mm. This could give a resolution of 0.5m, although there is some evidence that the lens diameter was only 420mm, which would reduce the ground resolution to only 0.7m. The lens was retractable and had a cover which only opened when the camera was taking photographs. The film type is unknown but might be the same as in the Zenit, which had 300mm x 300mm frames. The camera was developed by the Krasnogorsk Optical-Mechanical Plant (KMZ).

The satellite de-orbited by retracting the lens into the special equipment module. The other two modules and the lens shade separated and burnt up in the atmosphere. The reentry vehicle then landed on the ground. The computer and camera were designed to be reusable. The craft contained a self-destruct mechanism.

== Operation ==
The first test launch of a Yantar-2K was on 23 May 1974 which ended in launch failure and the loss of the satellite. The second flight, on 13 December 1974, was successful and Kosmos 697 landed after 12 days. After seven test launches the satellite was taken into service with the first one on 5 August 1978. There were thirty launches in total, including test launches, with the last one on 28 June 1983.

Yantar-2K was replaced by the similar Yantar-4K1, named Oktan. It had its first test launch on 27 April 1979 and had its first operational flight in 1982.
