= Yantar-4K1 =

Soviet reconnaissance satellite

- Manufacturer: TsSKB
- Country of origin: Soviet Union
- Operator: GRU
- Applications: Reconnaissance satellite

Specifications
- Bus: Yantar
- Launch mass: 6,600 kilograms (14,600 lb)
- Dimensions: 6.5 by 2.7 metres (21.3 ft × 8.9 ft)
- Equipment: Zhemchug-18 camera
- Regime: Low Earth Orbit
- Design life: 45 days

Production
- Status: Retired
- Launched: 12
- Maiden launch: 27 April 1979 (Kosmos 1097)
- Last launch: 11 November 1983 (Kosmos 1511)

Related spacecraft
- Derived from: Yantar-2K

Yantar-4K1 (Russian: Янтарь meaning amber) was a type of Soviet reconnaissance satellite which supplemented and eventually replaced the Zenit spacecraft. It was the second satellite of the Yantar series and was managed by the Soviet military intelligence agency, the GRU. These satellites were in orbit for 45 days and photographed sites of interest using a film camera. It had its first test launch in May 1979. It was only in military service from 1982 to 1983, had the GRAU index 11F693 and was given the name Oktan (Russian: Октан), meaning octane.

Yantar-4K1 was a modification of Yantar-2K. It had a better camera, a Zhemchug-18, and was in orbit for 45 days rather than the 30 days of Yantar-2K. Other systems were the same as the Yantar-2K and both types of satellites were launched in the same period.

Launches from Plesetsk had an inclination of 67.1-67.2 degrees, one from Baikonur had 64.9 degree orbits and one launch in April 1983 (Kosmos 1457) had an orbit of 70.4 degrees.

Yantar-2K was replaced by the Yantar-4K2, named Kobalt. It had its first test launch on 21 August 1981 and had its first operational flight in 1984.
