= Kosmos 1375 =

Soviet satellite

- Mission type: ASAT target
- COSPAR ID: 1982-055A
- SATCAT no.: 13259

Spacecraft properties
- Spacecraft type: Lira
- Manufacturer: Yuzhnoye
- Launch mass: 650 kilograms (1,430 lb)

Start of mission
- Launch date: 6 June 1982, 17:10 UTC
- Rocket: Kosmos-3M
- Launch site: Plesetsk 132/2

Orbital parameters
- Reference system: Geocentric
- Regime: Low Earth
- Perigee altitude: 986 kilometres (613 mi)
- Apogee altitude: 1,003 kilometres (623 mi)
- Inclination: 65.8 degrees
- Period: 105 minutes

Kosmos 1375 (Russian: Космос 1375 meaning Cosmos 1375) was a target satellite which was used by the Soviet Union in the 1980s for tests of anti-satellite weapons as part of the "anti-satellite weapon" Istrebitel Sputnikov program. It was a product of the Dnepropetrovsk Sputnik satellite development program.

It was launched at 17:10 UTC on 6 June 1982, using a Kosmos-3M carrier rocket, flying from Site 132/2 at the Plesetsk Cosmodrome in Northwest Russia. This was the final launch of a Dnepropetrovsk Sputnik program satellite, a program that dated back to the early 1960s.

Kosmos 1375 was placed into a low Earth orbit with a perigee of 986 kilometres (613 mi), an apogee of 1,003 kilometres (623 mi), 65.8 degrees of inclination, and an orbital period of 105 minutes. On 18 June 1982, it was successfully intercepted and destroyed by Kosmos 1379 in the final Soviet anti-satellite weapons test to be conducted. As of 2022, debris is still in orbit.

Kosmos 1375 was the last of ten Lira satellites to be launched, of which all but the first were successful. Lira was derived from the earlier DS-P1-M satellite, which it replaced.

== See also ==
- 1982 in spaceflight
