= Prague-Kbely Airport =

Prague–Kbely Airport Letiště Praha–Kbely
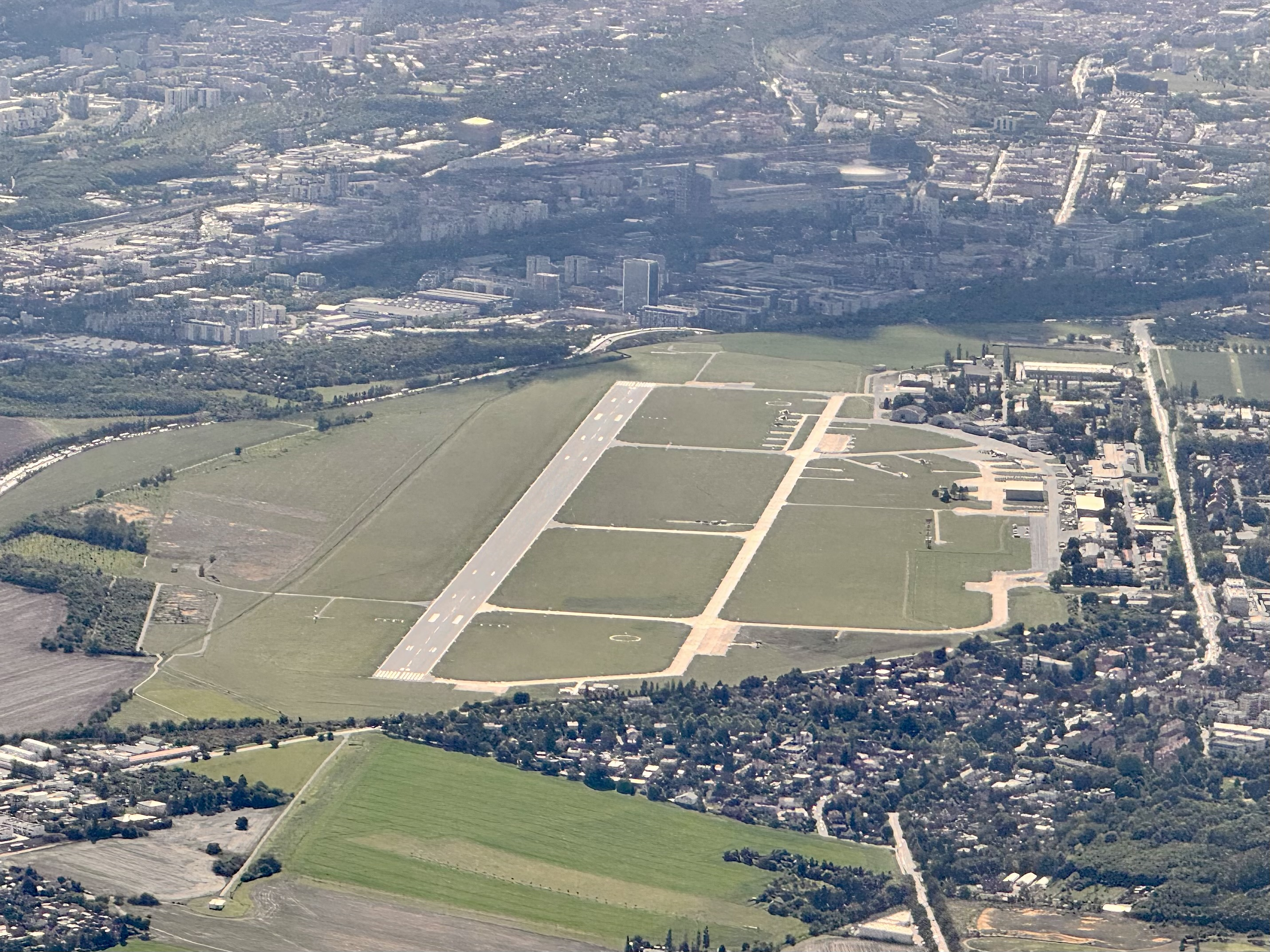
- Kbely Airport from above
- IATA: none; ICAO: LKKB

Summary
- Airport type: Military
- Location: Kbely, Prague, Czech Republic
- Opened: 1 December 1918
- Passenger services ceased: 5 April 1937
- Occupants: Czech Air Force
- Elevation AMSL: 939 ft (286 m)
- Coordinates: 50°07′16″N 014°32′35″E

Map
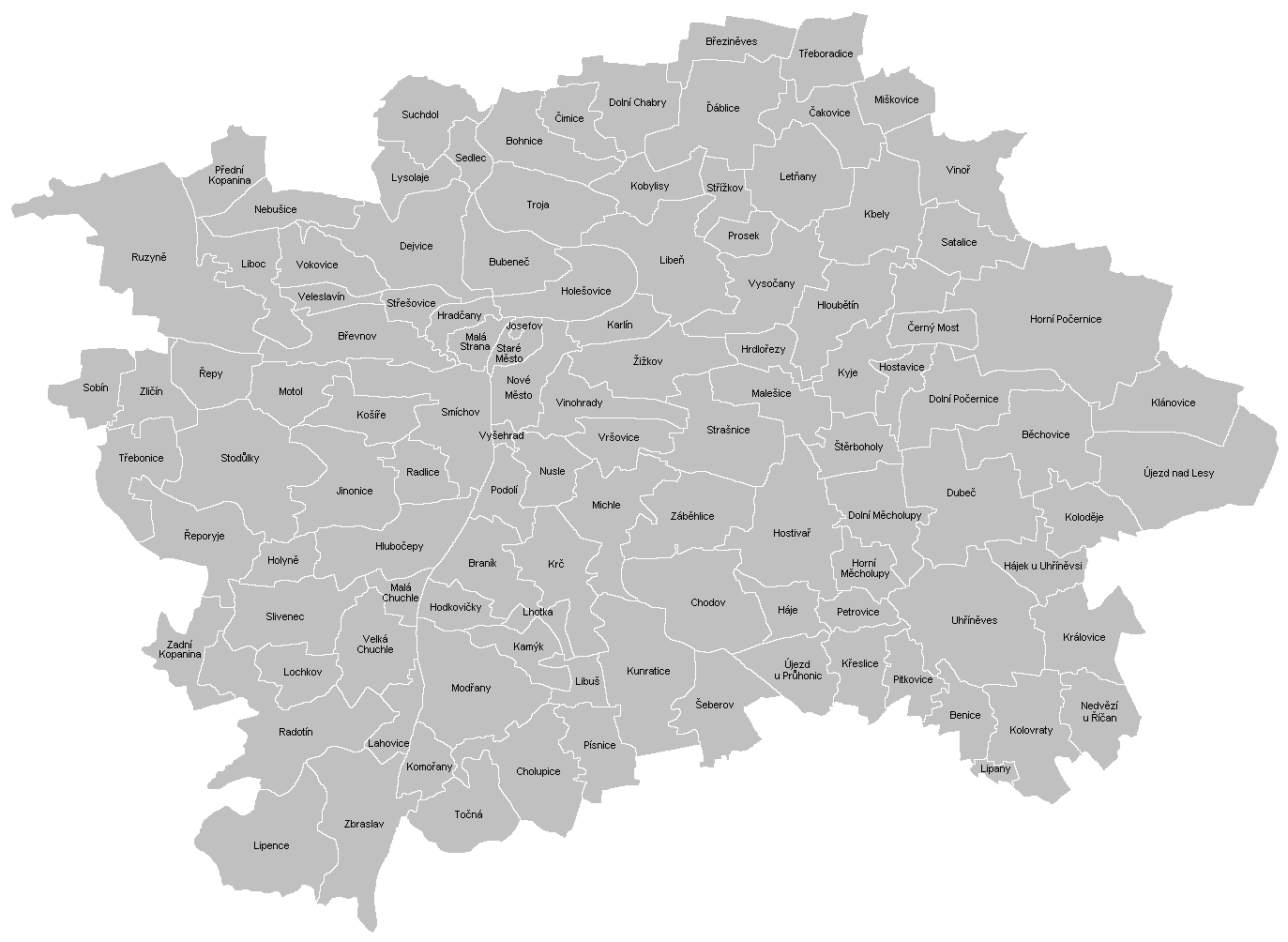
- Location within Greater Prague Location within Czech Republic

Runways
Direction	Length		Surface
Direction	ft	m	Surface
06/24	6 824	2,080	Asphalt

Prague–Kbely Airport (Czech: letiště Praha–Kbely) (ICAO: LKKB) is a military airport located in Kbely, in the northeast municipal district of Prague, Czech Republic. Once Prague's principal airport, it is now used mainly as a military base for the Czech Air Force. It is the Czech republic's first ever airport.

Kbely airfield is no longer used as a front-line Czech Air Force base, but it is utilised by military transport aircraft of the Czech Air Force, and the VIP aircraft which are used to transport Czech politicians. Kbely Aviation Museum is also located at this airport, with a collection that includes 275 aircraft.

Kbely Airport is very close to Letňany Airport, located 1 kilometre (0.62 mi) to the northwest, which has two grass runways and is currently used as a venue for air shows and other events.

== History ==
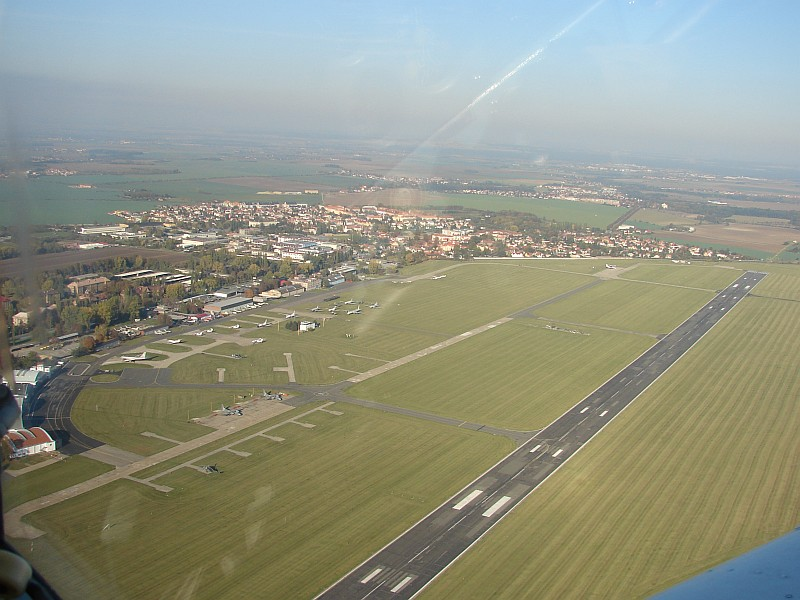
The airport in 2010

Kbely Airport was built in 1918 and was Prague's only airport until the construction of Ruzyně Airport in 1937, on the northwest side of the city. It was the first Czechoslovak military airfield, and during the inter-war period was the venue for several major public air shows. Between 1918 and 1937, it served commercial aviation and was home base of Czechoslovak Airline (ČLS) and Czechoslovak Airlines (ČSA; now Czech Airlines). The first scheduled flight operated by Czechoslovak Airlines departed from Kbely for Bratislava in October 1923.

== See also ==
- Prague Aviation Museum
