= Vladimír Remek =

Czech cosmonaut and politician (born 1948)

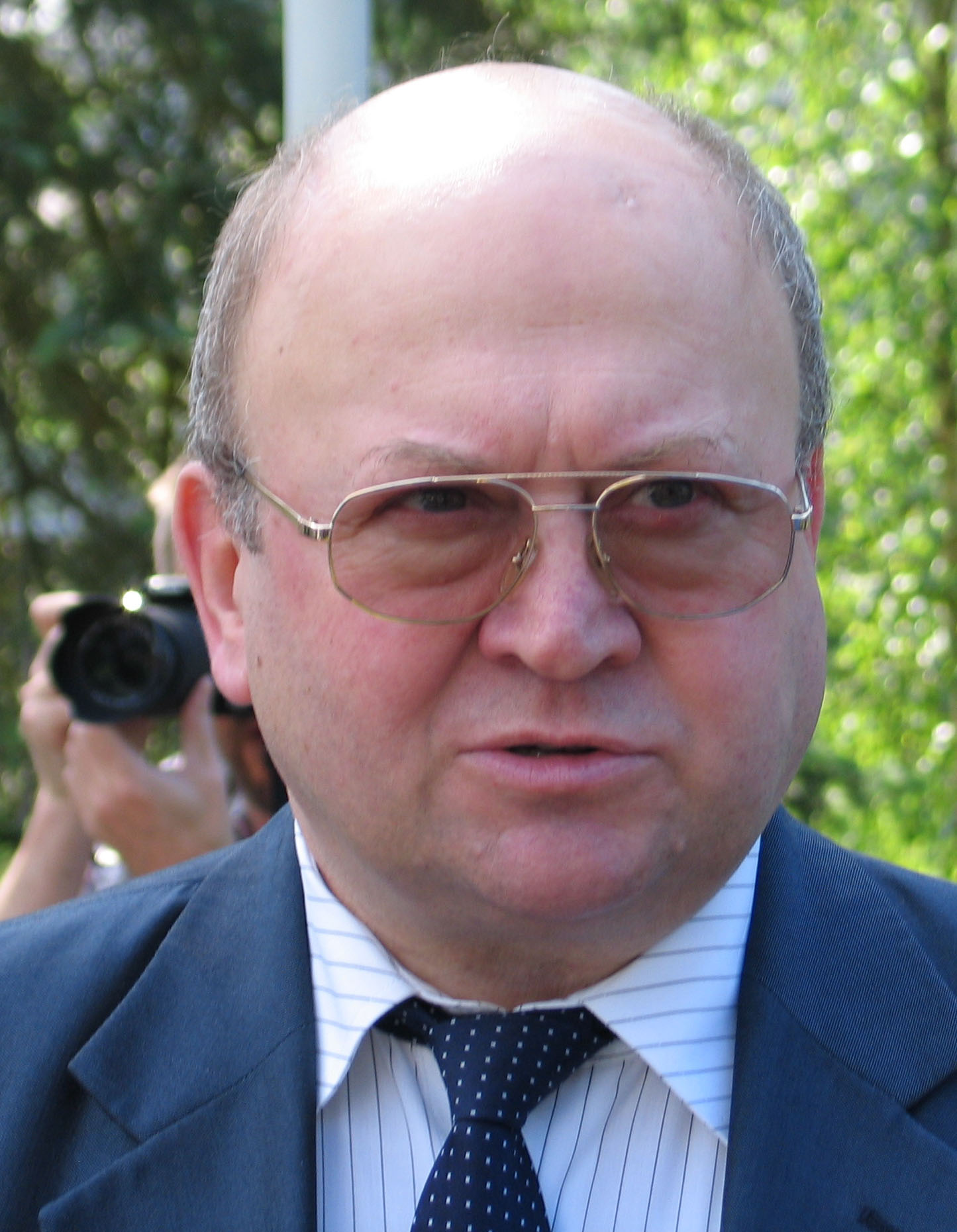

Czech Republic Ambassador to Russia
- In office 16 January 2014 – 31 January 2018
- President: Miloš Zeman
- Preceded by: Petr Kolář
- Succeeded by: Vladimír Pivoňka

Member of the European Parliament
- In office 20 July 2004 – 15 December 2013

Personal details
- Born: 26 September 1948 (age 78) České Budějovice, Czechoslovakia
- Party: Communist Party of Czechoslovakia (1967–1990); Independent (Note: Candidate for the Communist Party of Bohemia and Moravia, but not legally a party member) (2004–2013)
- Spouses: Hana Davidová (divorced): Jana Remková
- Children: 2
- Occupation: Pilot, cosmonaut, politician, ambassador
- Awards: Hero of the Czechoslovak Socialist Republic; Hero of the Soviet Union; Order of Klement Gottwald; Hero of Socialist Labor (Czechoslovakia); Order of Lenin; Medal for Service to the Fatherland; Gold Medal from Czechoslovak Academy of Sciences; Medal "For Merit in Space Exploration"
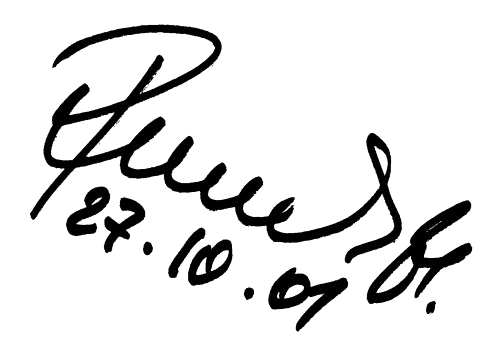
- Signature
- Website: vladimirremek.cz
- Nickname: Volodya
- Military career
- Branch: Czechoslovak Air Force
- Service years: 1970–1995
- Rank: Colonel
- Unit: 1st Fighter Air Regiment
- Commands: Deputy, 2nd Air Defense Division
- Space career

Intercosmos Cosmonaut
- Time in space: 7d 22h 17m
- Selection: Air Force Group 6
- Missions: Soyuz 28

Vladimír Remek (born 26 September 1948) is a Czech politician and diplomat, as well as a former cosmonaut and military pilot. He flew aboard Soyuz 28 from 2 to 10 March 1978, becoming the first and only Czechoslovak in space. As the first flight of the Soviet space program's Interkosmos, he was the first space traveller from a country other than the Soviet Union or the United States. The European Space Agency considers him the "first European in space". Remek is considered to be the first astronaut from the European Union. Remek was a member of the European Parliament between 2004 and 2013 for the Communist Party of Bohemia and Moravia. From 2014 to 2018, he was the Czech Ambassador to Russia.

== Early life and military career ==
Remek was born on 26 September 1948 in České Budějovice (now in the Czech Republic). He spent two years studying at the observatory in Kraví hora, Brno between 1962 and 1964. Remek was influenced by his father, Jozef Remek, himself a military pilot. Remek was an active member both in the Pioneers and the Czechoslovak Union of Youth. He studied mathematics and physics at middle school in Čáslav where he earned awards in track running the 400-meter, 800-meter, and 1,500-meter events. Remek graduated in 1966 and proceeded to Vyšší Letecké Učiliště, an aviation school in Košice, where he trained in an Aero L-29 Delfín. Remek graduated in 1970, and was commissioned as a lieutenant in the Czechoslovak Air Force. Remek served as a fighter pilot, flying MiG-21s in the 1st Fighter Air Regiment. In the 1970s Remek married his first wife, Czech actress Hana Davidová, the daughter of politician Václav David. They had a daughter together, Anna, in 1980. He had a second daughter, Jana, three years after the first, with his second wife, also called Jana.

From 1972 to 1976, Remek studied at the Gagarin Air Force Academy. Upon his return to Czechoslovakia in 1976, he was promoted to captain and appointed deputy commander of his fighter regiment, after which Remek went back to Russia to train for the Soviet-led space program. Following his return from space in March 1978, Remek spent time in the Czechoslovak People's Army (ČSLA) staff as the deputy director of the Flight Research Institute in Prague. In 1986, Remek became the deputy commander of a flight division based in Čáslav. In 1988, he graduated from Voroshilov-Staff Academy of Soviet Air Force and was appointed to his highest command, as deputy of the 2nd Air Defense Division stationed in Moravia. Following the Velvet Revolution in 1989, Remek was relegated to a role as Director of the Museum for Aviation and Astronautics in Prague. Following his retirement from the Czech Air Force in 1995, Remek represented Czech firm CZ Strakonice and joint venture CZ–Turbo-GAZ in Moscow.

== Interkosmos programme ==
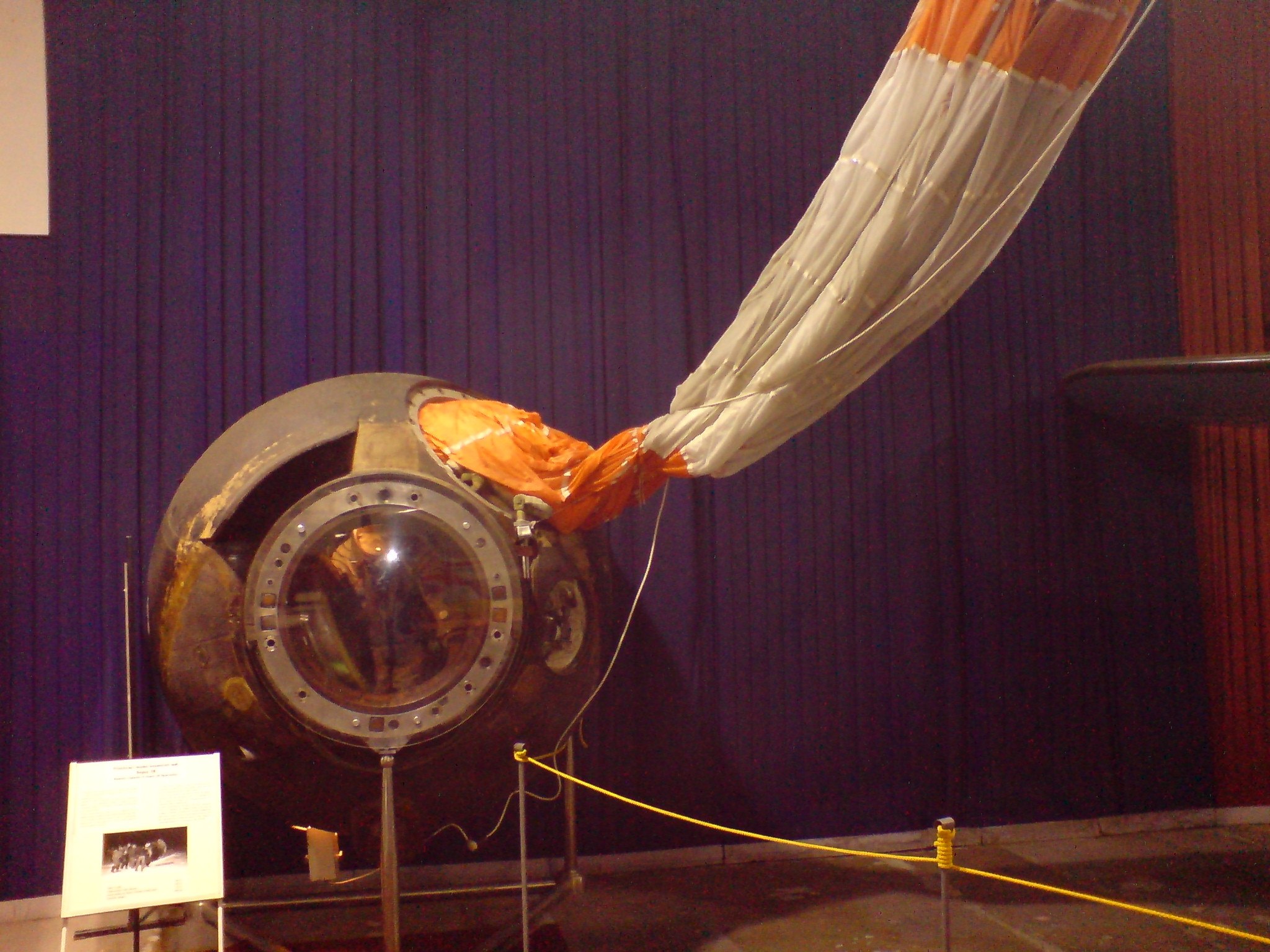
Module used by Remek to return to Earth at the Kbely Aviation Museum in Kbely, Prague

Remek (then a Captain) joined the Interkosmos program in 1976; his backup was Oldřich Pelčák, the other Czechoslovak cosmonaut selected to participate with the program. During the flight, Remek experimented with the Kristall furnace on board the capsule. The mission, coinciding with the 30th anniversary of the Soviet-backed 1948 Czechoslovak coup d'état, and including Remek, the son of a Czech mother and Slovak father, had propaganda value in stressing Czechoslovak-Soviet cooperation. Remek himself has not denied this although he retains pride in his voyage regardless of the circumstances. On the Soyuz 28 mission that launched 2 March 1978, he became the first space traveller from a country other than the Soviet Union or the United States. After Remek's flight, he was celebrated in his home country with a series of receptions at factories and other civil workplaces. He was also recognized at a ceremony at Prague Castle as a guest of Gustáv Husák, then the General Secretary of the Communist Party of Czechoslovakia. On 16 March, Remek and Aleksei Gubarev, the other member of the crew, were awarded the medal Hero of the Soviet Union. Czechoslovak reaction to Remek's flight included comments about the media's inundation focused on Remek and the fact that he was only able to journey with a Soviet cosmonaut as if Remek needed a minder. One joke went: "Why didn't the Soviets send up two Czechoslovak cosmonauts? Because they would've landed in West Germany." Remek himself joked that his Soviet counterpart would slap Remek's hands off of controls if he touched anything without permission. French astronaut Jean-Loup Chrétien experienced this same behavior onboard Soyuz TM-7 in 1988.

== Political career ==
Due in part to his previous business contacts in Russia, Remek was appointed to the Czech Embassy in Moscow as a Trade and Economic Counselor. During the 2004 European Parliament election, Remek was a candidate for the Communist Party of Bohemia and Moravia and, being second on the list behind Miloslav Ransdorf, was elected into the European Parliament. During his first term (20 July 2004 to 13 July 2009), Remek was a member of the Confederal Group of the European United Left–Nordic Green Left in the European Parliament. He was a vocal proponent of the EU's Galileo satellite constellation, warning that bureaucratic delay could cede opportunity to the BeiDou, a Chinese competitor. He was reelected in 2009. When Petr Kolář resigned as the Czech Ambassador to Russia in December 2012, the ambassadorship sat empty for a year until the President of the Czech Republic, Miloš Zeman, appointed Remek in January 2014. The appointment met with controversy as it was against the wishes of Zeman's Foreign Minister, Karel Schwarzenberg. Observers have noted Remek has a friendly history with the Russians and although his communist affiliations are a minority in Russia, his appointment represents Zeman's pragmatic and pro-Russia stance.

== In popular culture ==
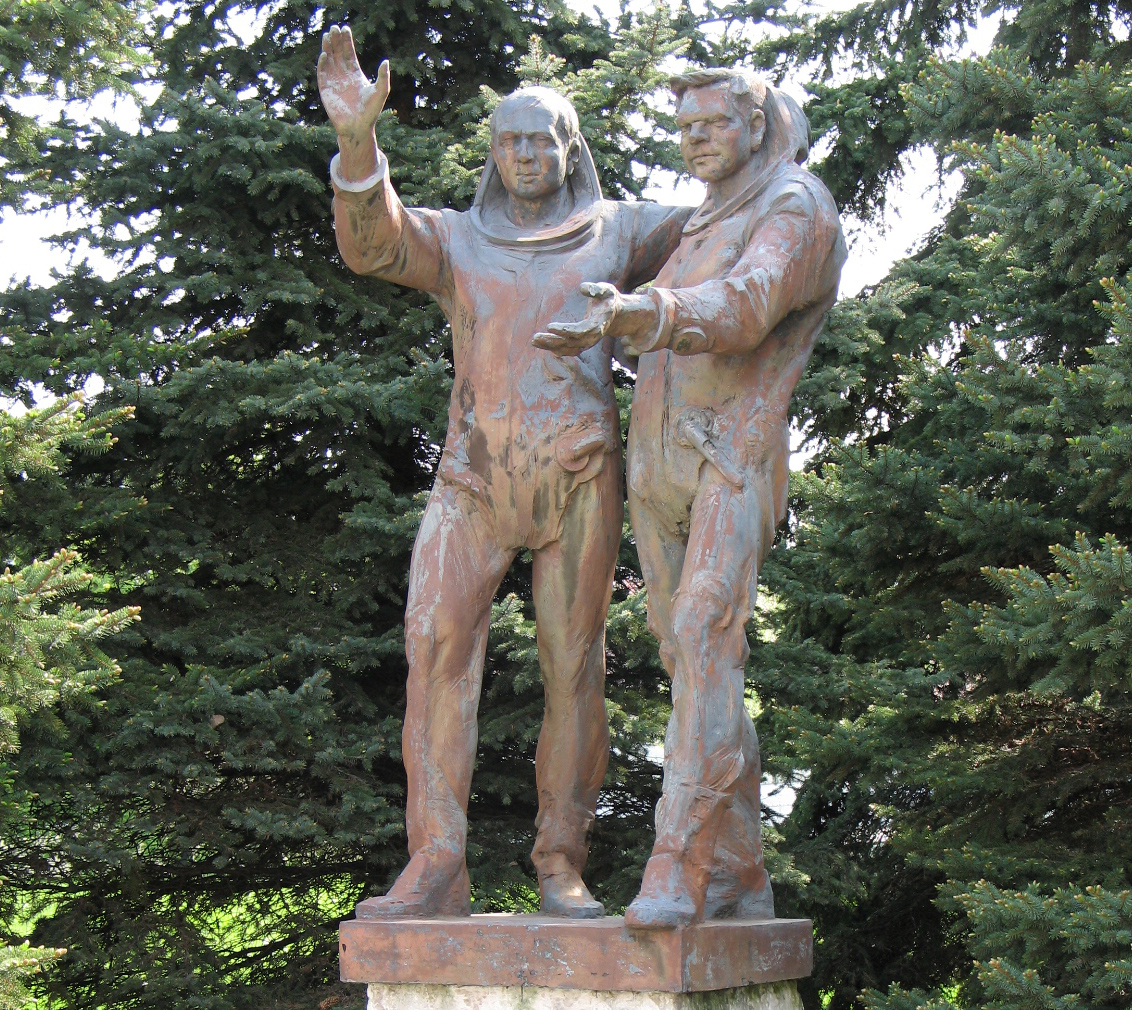
Statue of Remek and Gubarev in Košice

Czech astronomer Antonín Mrkos discovered an asteroid in September 1978 and named it 2552 Remek after the cosmonaut. Remek is featured in a 2009 independent comedy film called Osadne about three residents from Osadné that seek out Remek at his office in Brussels to help tourism in their town. Sculptor Jan Bartoš created a statue of Remek and Gubarev, which is located at Háje metro station, formerly known as Kosmonautů (meaning [station] of the cosmonauts) until 1990, in Prague. Another statue of Remek is located in Košice, Slovakia.

== Bibliography ==
- Splněné náděje. Panorama. 1979.
- Richter, Karel, ed. (1982). Pod námi planeta země. Prague: Naše Vojsko.
- Kosmická budoucnost lidstva: Města v kosmu. MF. 1986.

== See also ==
- Ivan Bella, the first Slovak in space (1999)
