= Petr Kolář =

Czech diplomat (born 1962)

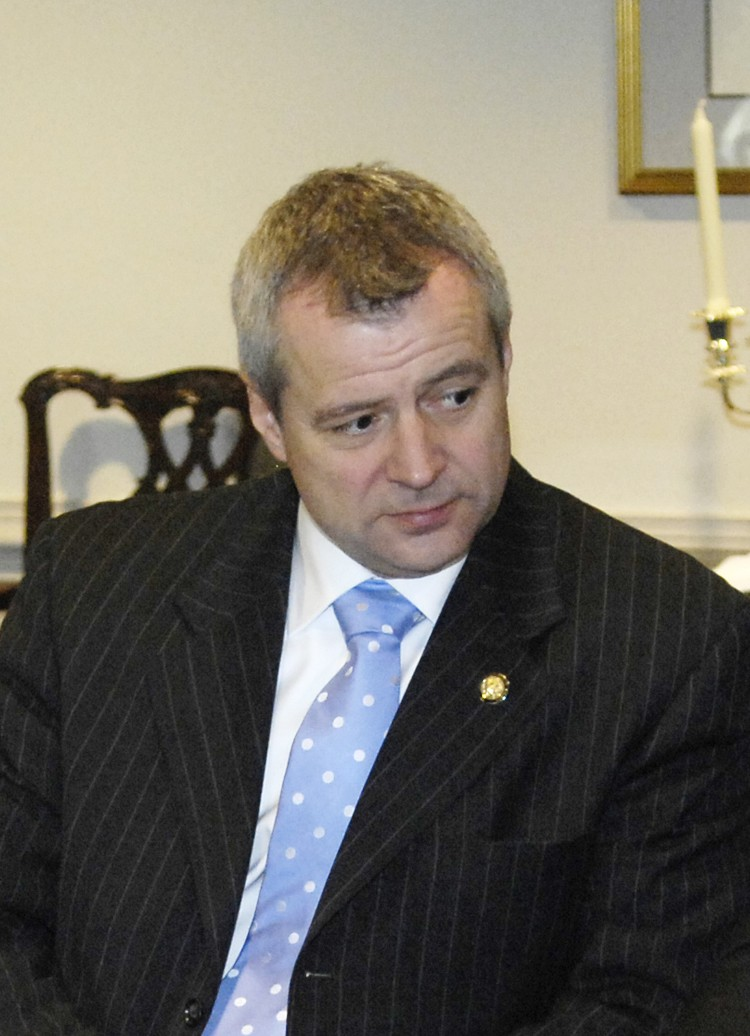

Czech Republic Ambassador to Sweden
- In office 5 September 1996 – 1998
- President: Václav Havel
- Preceded by: Václav Frýbert
- Succeeded by: Tomáš Husák

Czech Republic Ambassador to Ireland
- In office 13 September 1999 – 2003
- President: Václav Havel
- Preceded by: Luboš Nový
- Succeeded by: Josef Havlas

Czech Republic Ambassador to the United States
- In office 2 December 2005 – 30 June 2010
- President: Václav Klaus
- Preceded by: Martin Palouš
- Succeeded by: Petr Gandalovič

Czech Republic Ambassador to Russia
- In office 8 February 2011 – 31 December 2012
- President: Václav Klaus
- Preceded by: Miroslav Kostelka
- Succeeded by: Vladimír Remek

Personal details
- Born: 27 September 1962 (age 64) České Budějovice, Czechoslovakia
- Spouse: Jaroslava Kolářová (div.)
- Domestic partner: Světlana Witowská
- Children: 2, including Ondřej
- Education: Charles University
- Profession: Diplomat
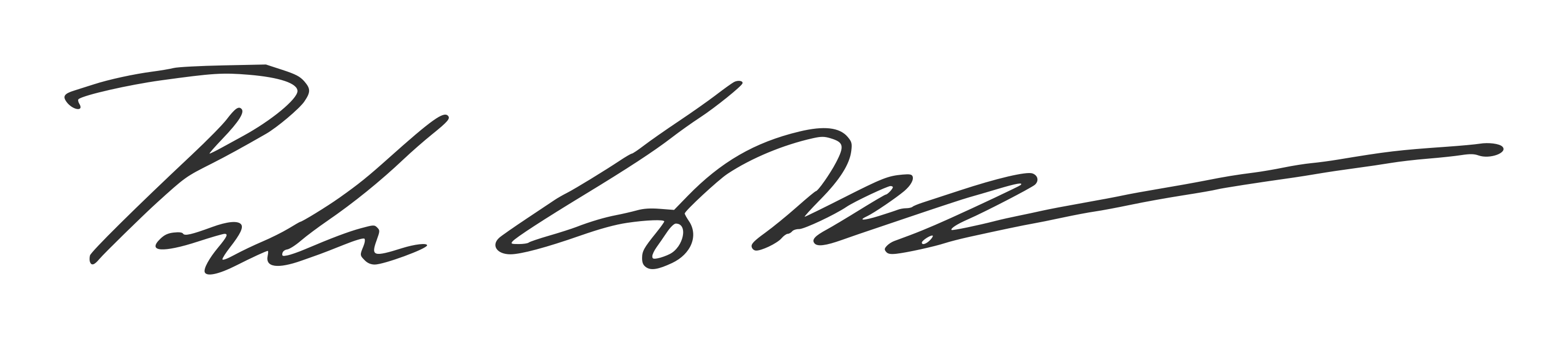
- Signature

Petr Kolář (born 27 September 1962) is a Czech politician and diplomat, who has served as the Czech ambassador to several countries, including Russia (2010–2012) and the United States (2005–2010).

== Diplomatic career ==
Kolář has held numerous positions at the Ministry of Foreign Affairs. He has served as the Czech Ambassador to Sweden (1996–1998), the Republic of Ireland (1999–2003), Russia (2010–2012), and the United States (2005–2010). From 1 September 2003 to 12 October 2005, he was Deputy Foreign Affairs Minister for Bilateral Relations.

He has been a senior advisor to the law firm Squire Patton Boggs in Prague since 2016.

== Personal life ==
Kolář was married to Jaroslava Kolářová and has two sons, including Ondřej, who served as mayor of the Prague 6 district from 2014 to 2022 before becoming an MEP in 2021. In January 2020, Kolář's wife died, and he subsequently entered into a relationship with TV presenter Světlana Witowská.
