= Soyuz 28 =

1978 Soviet crewed spaceflight to Salyut 6

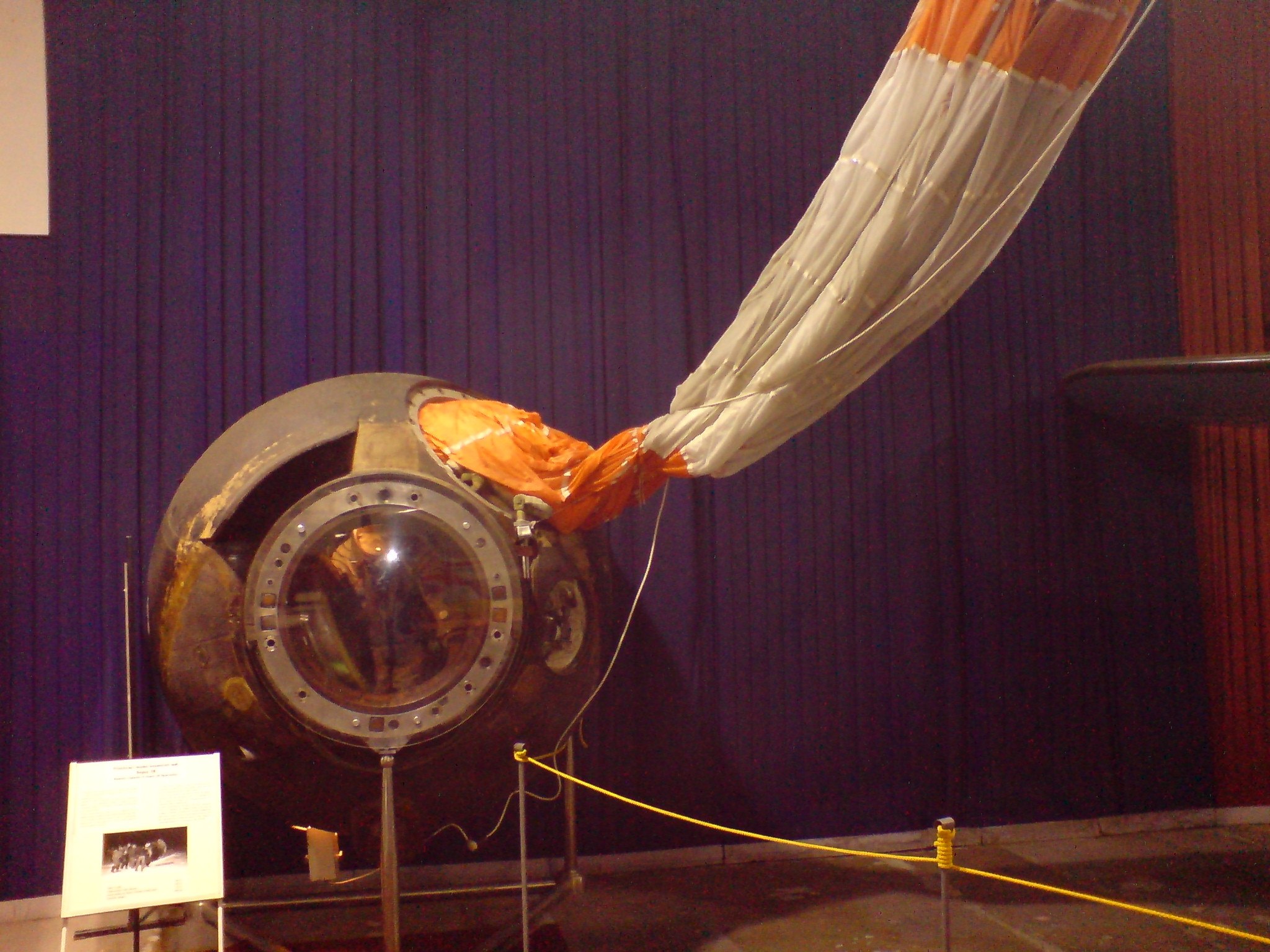
- The Soyuz 28 return capsule, on display at the Prague Aviation Museum, Kbely
- Operator: Soviet space program
- COSPAR ID: 1978-023A
- SATCAT no.: 10694
- Mission duration: 7 days, 22 hours and 16 minutes
- Orbits completed: 125

Spacecraft properties
- Spacecraft type: Soyuz 7K-T
- Manufacturer: NPO Energia
- Launch mass: 6,800 kg (15,000 lb)

Crew
- Crew size: 2
- Members: Aleksei Gubarev; Vladimír Remek
- Callsign: Зенит (Zenit – "Zenith")

Start of mission
- Launch date: 2 March 1978, 15:28:10 UTC
- Rocket: Soyuz-U
- Launch site: Baikonur 1/5

End of mission
- Landing date: 10 March 1978, 13:44:10 UTC
- Landing site: 51.05°N 66.7°E

Orbital parameters
- Reference system: Geocentric
- Regime: Low Earth
- Perigee altitude: 198.9 km (123.6 mi)
- Apogee altitude: 275.6 km (171.2 mi)
- Inclination: 51.65 degrees
- Period: 88.95 minutes

Docking with Salyut 6
- Docking port: Aft
- Docking date: 3 March 1978, 17:09:30 UTC
- Undocking date: 10 March 1978, 10:23:30 UTC
- Time docked: 6 days, 17 hours and 14 minutes
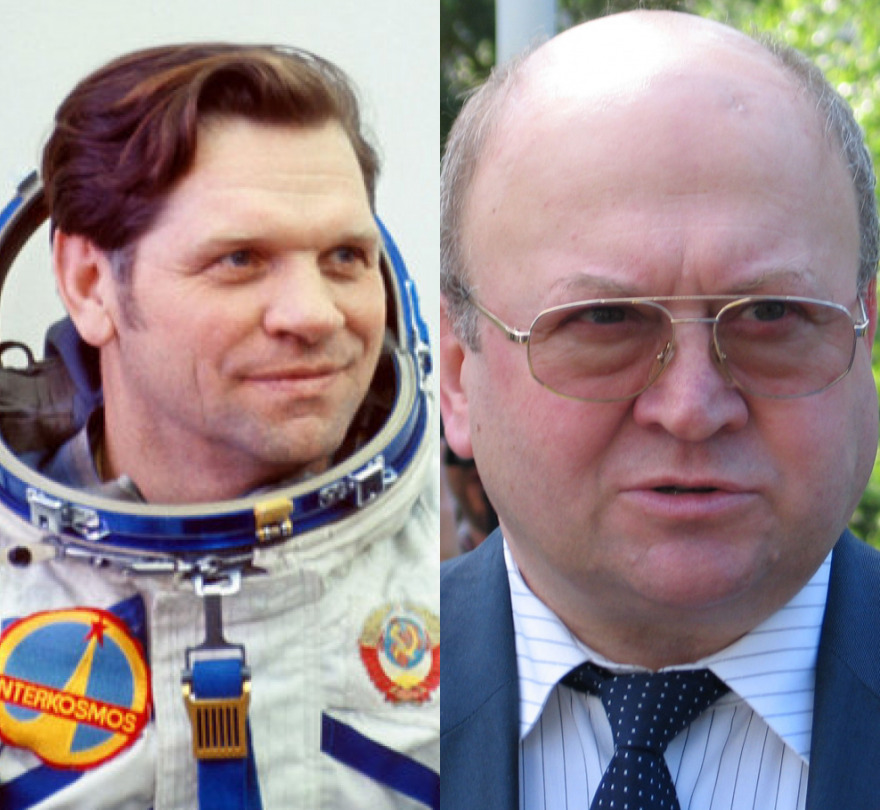
- Gubarev (left) and Remek (right) Soyuz programme

Soyuz 28 (Russian: Союз 28, Union 28) was a March 1978 Soviet crewed mission to the orbiting Salyut 6 space station. It was the fourth mission to the station, the third successful docking, and the second visit to the resident crew launched in Soyuz 26.

Cosmonaut Vladimír Remek from Czechoslovakia became the first person launched into space who was not a citizen of the United States or the Soviet Union. The other crew member was Aleksei Gubarev. The flight was the first mission in the Intercosmos program that gave Eastern Bloc and other communist states access to space through crewed and uncrewed launches.

== Crew ==
Prime crew
Position	Cosmonaut
Commander	Aleksei Gubarev; EP-2; Second and last spaceflight
Research cosmonaut	Vladimír Remek, Interkosmos; EP-2; Only spaceflight

Backup crew
Position	Cosmonaut
Commander	Nikolai Rukavishnikov
Research cosmonaut	Oldřich Pelčák, Interkosmos

== Mission parameters ==
- Mass: 6,800 kg (15,000 lb)
- Perigee: 198.9 km (123.6 mi)
- Apogee: 275.6 km (171.2 mi)
- Inclination: 51.65°
- Period: 88.95 minutes

== Mission highlights ==
The Soyuz 28 mission was the first Intercosmos flight, whereby military pilots from Soviet bloc nations were flown on flights of about eight days to a Soviet space station. Pilots from other nations would eventually also fly. The program was a reaction to American plans to fly Western Europeans on Space Shuttle missions.

Vladimir Remek, the first non-Soviet, non-American to travel to space, was launched aboard Soyuz 28 on 2 March 1978, after a three-day delay of unspecified cause. The Soyuz commander was Soviet cosmonaut Aleksei Gubarev. The crew docked with the orbiting Salyut 6 space station, and greeted the occupants Georgi Grechko and Yuri Romanenko who had arrived on Soyuz 26 in December. Gubarev and Grechko had previously flown together on Soyuz 17 to the Salyut 4 space station in 1975.

The day after the docking, the Soyuz 26 crew celebrated their breaking of the space endurance record of 84 days, set by the Skylab 4 crew in 1974.

While the mission had a political purpose, scientific experiments were carried out, including one which monitored the growth of chlorella algae in zero gravity, another which used the on-board Splav furnace to melt glass, lead, silver, and copper chlorides, and an experiment called Oxymeter which measured oxygen in human tissue.

On 10 March, the Soyuz 28 crew prepared for their return to Earth, packing experiments and testing systems. They undocked from the station and landed 310 km (190 mi) west of Tselinograd later that day.

A joke appeared soon after the mission that Remek's hand had mysteriously turned red. He informed the doctors, the joke goes, that this was because every time he went to touch something, the Soviet crewmembers would slap his hand and yell, "Don't touch that!"
