= Ondřej Kolář (politician) =

Czech politician and lawyer

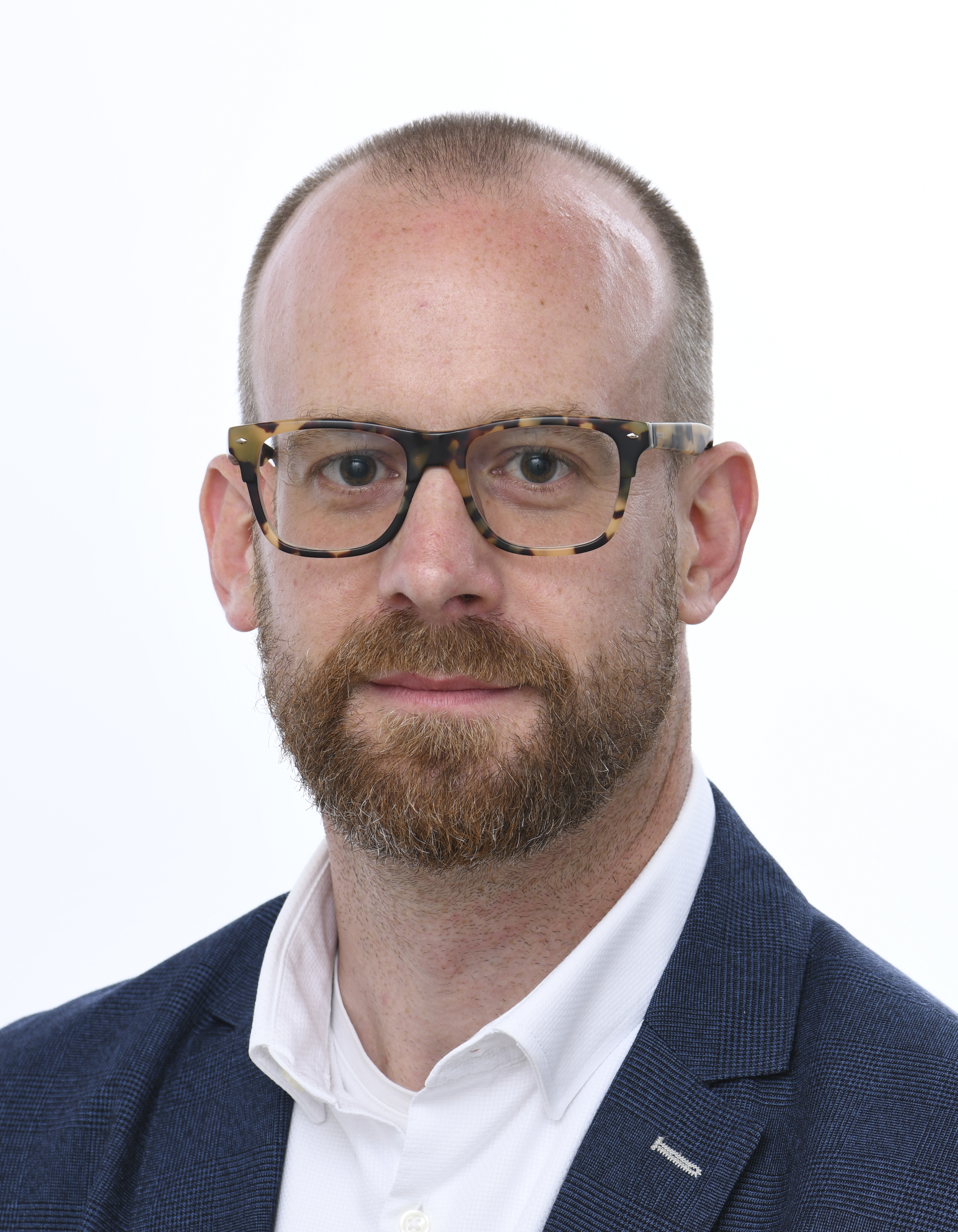
- Official portrait, 2024

Member of the European Parliament for the Czech Republic
- Incumbent
- Assumed office 16 July 2024

Member of the Chamber of Deputies
- In office 9 October 2021 – 14 June 2024

Mayor of Prague 6
- In office 21 November 2014 – 24 October 2022
- Preceded by: Marie Kousalíková
- Succeeded by: Jakub Stárek

Personal details
- Born: 13 March 1984 (age 42) Prague, Czechoslovakia
- Party: TOP 09 (2010–present)
- Parent: Petr Kolář (father)
- Education: Faculty of Social Sciences, Charles University; University of West Bohemia; American University Washington College of Law; Trinity College Dublin

Ondřej Kolář (born 13 March 1984) is a Czech politician and lawyer who has been a member of the European Parliament since July 2024, representing TOP 09. He was previously a member of the Chamber of Deputies of the Czech Republic from 2021 to 2024, and mayor of the Prague 6 district from 2014 until 2022.

== Early life ==
Kolář was born in Prague, the son of Czech diplomat Petr Kolář. In his childhood he lived in Norway, Sweden, and Ireland. After returning to the Czech Republic, Kolář studied media studies at the Faculty of Social Sciences, Charles University and law at the University of West Bohemia. He also completed the international legal theories program at American University Washington College of Law and one year of German studies at Trinity College Dublin. In 2011, Kolář started working as secretary to the Foreign Minister and TOP 09 leader Karel Schwarzenberg.

== Political career ==
=== Prague 6 ===
In 2013, Kolář became the chairman of the TOP 09 branch in Prague 6. In October 2014, he led TOP 09 to victory in the municipal elections, and was elected mayor of the district in November 2014.

In April 2017, Kolář received media attention after Prague City Hall paid 50,000 CZK for his interview in the men's magazine Playboy. The city hall attributed the payment to an employee error. Kolář resolved the situation by paying Prague 6 the amount for the article.

According to a survey by Phoenix Research, Kolář was the second-most popular district mayor in Prague in 2017.

On 13 May 2017, Kolář attended the unveiling of the foundation stone of the future monument to Maria Theresa in Hradčany, commissioned by Prague 6 at a cost of almost 4,000,000 CZK. Kolář stated that: "Marie Theresa is the only woman who ever sat on the Czech throne, and therefore she deserves such a monument."

On 18 April 2018, Kolář filed a criminal complaint against himself, stating: "As soon as we approved in the council in 2016, the termination of the disadvantageous contract by which Prague 6 releases Poliklinika Pod Marjánkou to a private individual, we were criticised that the termination was poorly-executed that we paid severance pay without authorization."

Kolář launched the initiative to add an information board to the monument to Soviet Marshal Konev in Prague 6, which explained his merits in liberating a large part of Bohemia from the Nazi occupation, but also noted his contribution to the suppression of the Hungarian Revolution of 1956 and his alleged patronage of the intelligence survey for the Warsaw Pact invasion of Czechoslovakia in 1968. The ambassadors of Russia, Belarus, Armenia, Azerbaijan, and Kazakhstan objected to the plaque. According to the Russian Embassy, Konev did not take part in the invasion in 1968 and had already left commanding positions in the Soviet armed forces due to his age.

In August 2019, Kolář expressed sympathy with the vandals who poured red paint on the Konev monument, and prevented the statue from being cleaned. In September 2019, the council of Prague 6 decided to remove the statue, which was removed from the pedestal on 3 April 2020 and taken into storage.

In the 2022 Czech municipal elections, Kolář ran for council in Prague 6 in the third place on the TOP 09 candidate list. He finished first due to preferential votes and thus defended his seat, but was replaced as mayor by Jakub Starek of ODS. Kolář served as an opposition representative in the Prague 6 council, but resigned his seat in November 2023.

=== National politics ===
In the 2021 Czech parliamentary election, Kolář ran for TOP 09 as the fourth placed candidate on the Spolu coalition list in Prague. With 27,259 preferential votes, he finally finished fifth and was elected as a member of parliament.

In the 2024 European Parliament election, Kolář ran as a member of TOP 09 as the sixth place candidate on the Spolu coalition list. He received 31,623 preferential votes and became an MEP. On 14 June, Kolář resigned as a member of the Chamber of Deputies and was replaced by his party colleague Martin Dlouhý.

== Political views ==
Kolář criticised the International Criminal Court in The Hague for issuing an arrest warrant for Israeli Prime Minister Benjamin Netanyahu on charges of war crimes during the Gaza war.

== Controversy ==
Although Kolář claimed before the elections that the municipal council of Prague 6 uses "mainly our in-house lawyers and we only need help from the outside in exceptional cases", the law office of Petr Kubíček, Kolář's classmate from the Faculty of Law in Plzeň, prepared a total of 12 legal opinions costing 844,035 CZK in August 2019. According to the lawyers, the legal analyses by several of Kolář's former classmates were overvalued. Aktuálně.cz reported in March 2020 that Kubíček's law office in Prague 6 received almost 340,000 CZK for two legal opinions which were plagiarised, and that Kubíček's analysis was created almost two months before the official order from the town hall. Kolář refused to comment.

Kolář tried to legally force opposition representative Jiří Hoskovec to delete a Facebook comment accusing him of taking lucrative city properties to Cyprus through the company SNEO. Ondřej Chrást, Pirate Party group leader on Prague 6 council, demanded Kolář's resignation in December 2019, accusing Kolář of behaving "like a Russian governor" and intimidating the opposition.

In March 2024, in an interview with CNN Prima News, Kolář called former Czech Foreign Minister Lubomír Zaorálek "vulgar". Zaorálek later demanded an apology from him.
