= Oldřich Pelčák =

Czech cosmonaut and engineer (1943–2023)

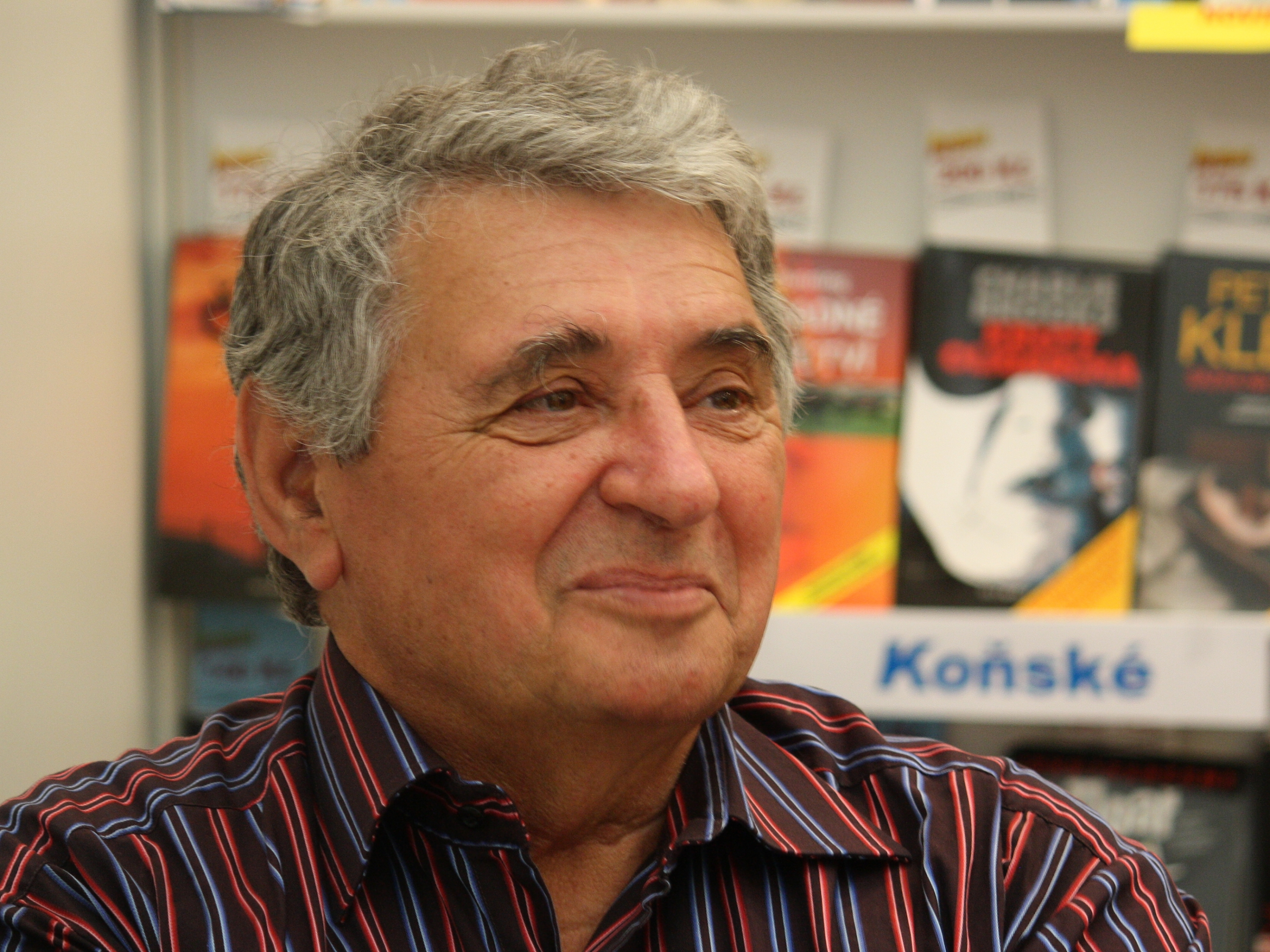
- Pelčák in 2011
- Born: 2 November 1943; Zlín, Protectorate of Bohemia and Moravia
- Died: 7 October 2023 (aged 79)
- Space career
- Selection: Air Force Group 6
- Missions: Soyuz 28 (backup)

Oldřich Pelčák (2 November 1943 – 7 October 2023) was a Czech cosmonaut and engineer. He graduated from Gagarin Air Force Academy. In 1976, Pelčák was selected as backup for fellow Czech Vladimír Remek for the Soyuz 28 mission. Remek was the first man in space who was neither American nor Soviet. Pelčák, who did not fly in space, died on 7 October 2023, at the age of 79.
