= Kbely Aviation Museum =

- Letecké Muzeum Kbely
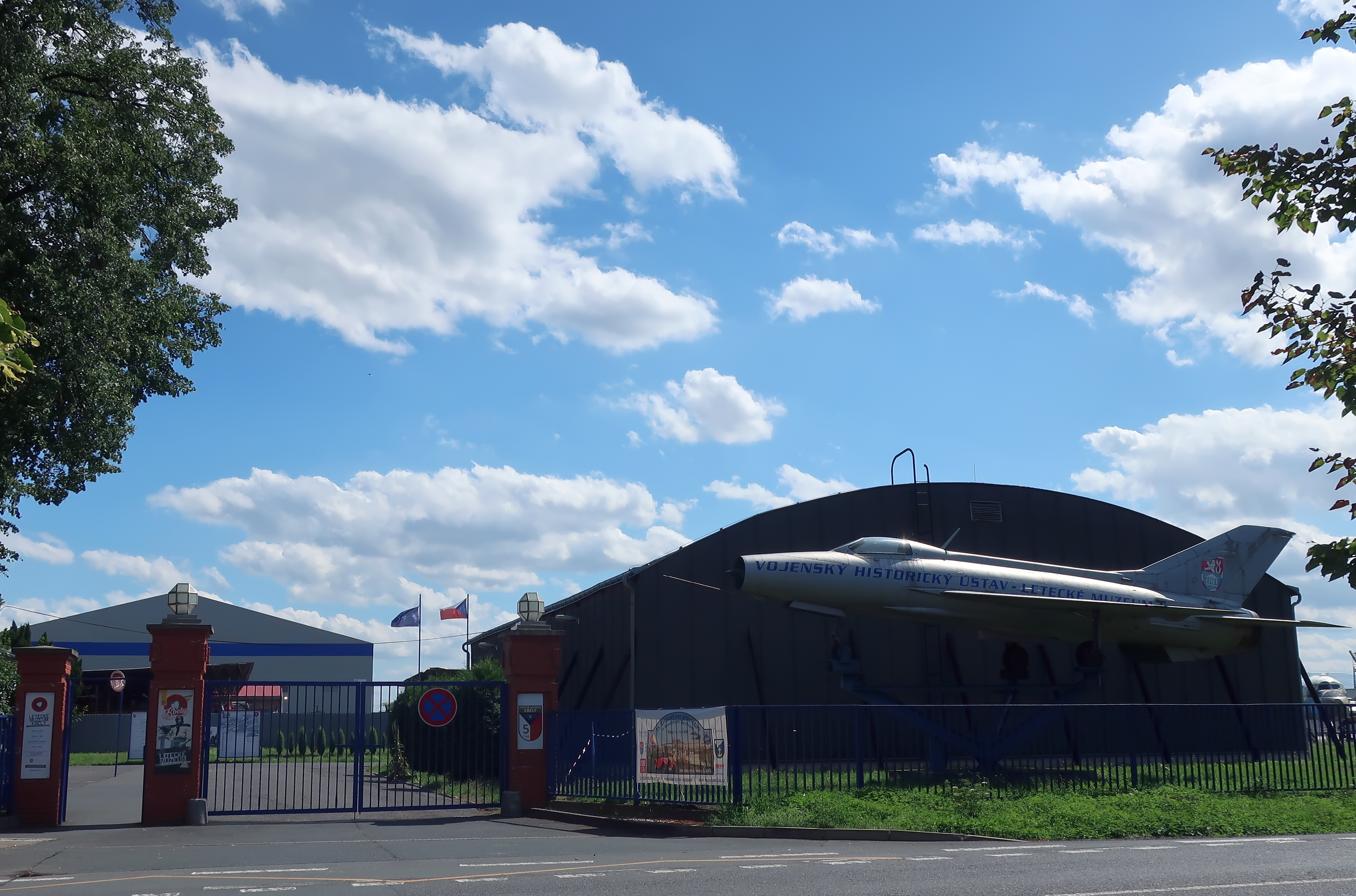
- Main entrance with a Mig-21 fighter bearing the name of the museum
- Interactive fullscreen map
- Established: 1968
- Location: Kbely Airport, Kbely, Czech Republic
- Coordinates: 50°07′32″N 14°32′07″E
- Type: Aviation museum
- Website: http://www.vhu.cz/muzea/zakladni-informace-o-lm-kbely/

Kbely Aviation Museum (Czech: Letecké Muzeum Kbely) is the largest aviation museum in the Czech Republic and one of the largest of its kind in Europe. It is located to the north-east of Prague, at the military airport Kbely.

== History ==
During the mid-1960s, the Prague Military Museum commenced a programme to recover, restore and preserve historic aircraft from around the country for eventual display at Kbely. Initially, one hangar was used, and about fifty aircraft were placed on public display. The aircraft collection continued to grow, and one of the original Wagner-type hangars on the airfield was brought into use, and now contains the earliest aircraft types on display. Another Picha-type hangar has also been added to bring the number of hangars housing the large and varied collection to four.

== Collection ==
The collection at Kbely now includes 275 aircraft, of which approximately 110 are on public display at any given time. The museum contains many Czech designed and Czech built aircraft dating from World War I through World War II and up to 1960's with a collection of supersonic jet fighters. Several unique types are on display, including the early 1920s-built Avia BH-11C L-BONK. The period before World War II is represented with aircraft such as the Avia B-534. World War II models include a Soviet-built Ilyushin Il-2 Shturmovik, Avia S-92 (Czech version of Messerschmitt Me-262A Schwalbe in typical Czech colour), Avia CS-92 (Messerschmitt Me-262B Schwalbe in typical German camouflage), Lavochkin La-7. The formerly displayed fully authentic Supermarine Spitfire LF.IX flown by a Czech squadron of the Royal Air Force was transferred to the National Technical Museum in Prague in 2008. The post-World War II period is represented by aircraft such as the Avia S-199 and double seated Avia CS-199 (Messerschmitt Bf 109G with Jumo engine) and the Aero C3A (Siebel Si-204).

In addition to the many military aircraft and helicopters on display, there are several Soviet-designed airliners, some of which were built under licence in Czechoslovakia. Airliners on display include the Avia 14M (Ilyushin Il-14), an Avia 14T, an ex-CSA Ilyushin Il-18 and a CSA Tupolev Tu-104. Light aircraft exhibited include the Czech-built Praga E-114 Air Baby of 1936, a Mraz Sokol, an Aero 45, an Orlican L-40 Meta Sokol and a Zlin 22 Junak. Helicopters on display include a HC-2 Heli-Baby designed by VZLU (Výzkumný a zkušební letecký ústav).

After 1 January 1993, when Czechoslovakia was divided, several aircraft were transferred from the collection to the Slovak Republic for inclusion in that country's aviation museums. Also, in recent years, the museum has exchanged several Czech, and Soviet-designed aircraft for aircraft from the US, UK, Sweden, Switzerland and other countries.

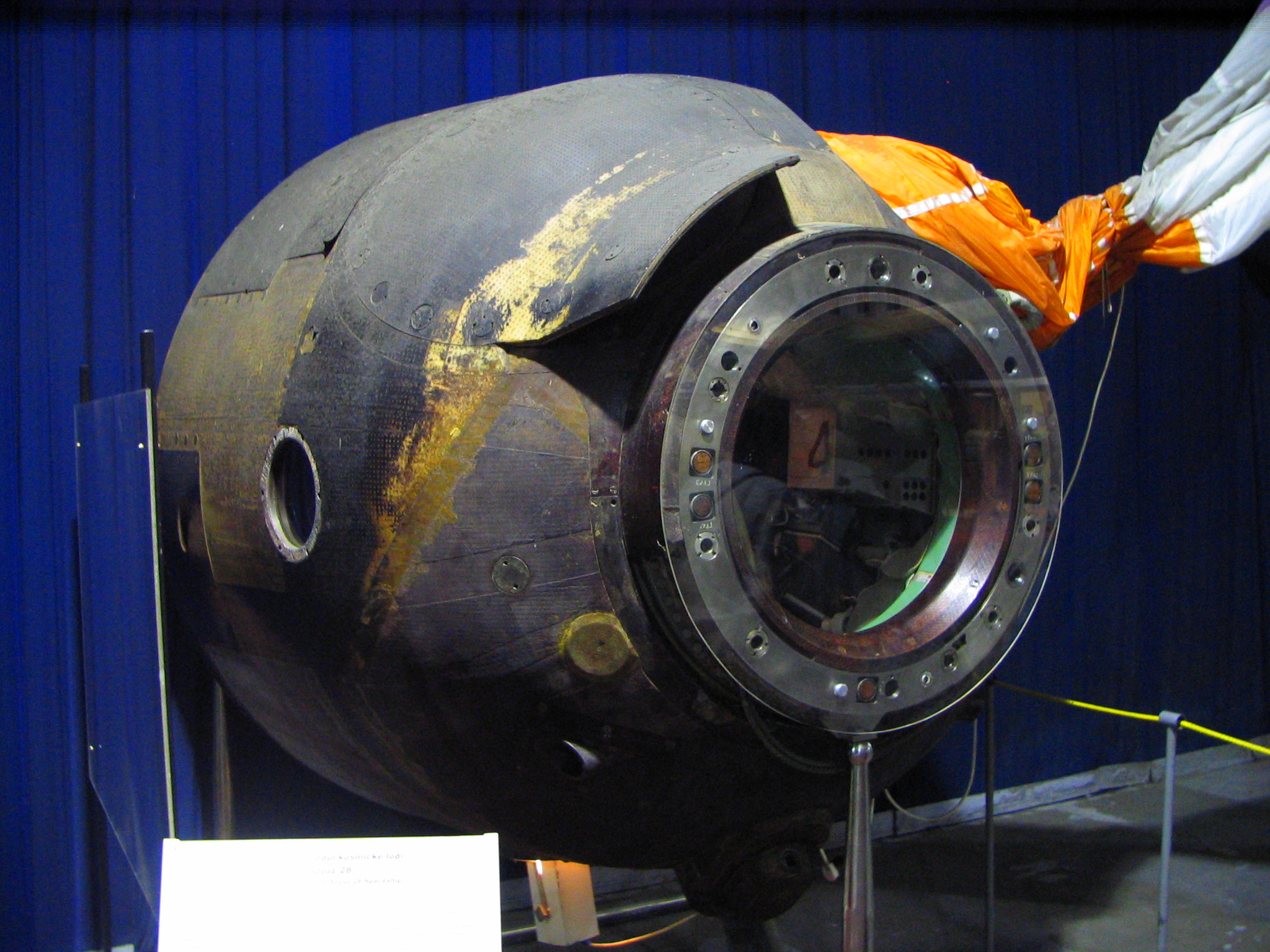
Soyuz 28 return capsule that Vladimír Remek returned to Earth in 1978 as the first non-American and non-Soviet cosmonaut in space

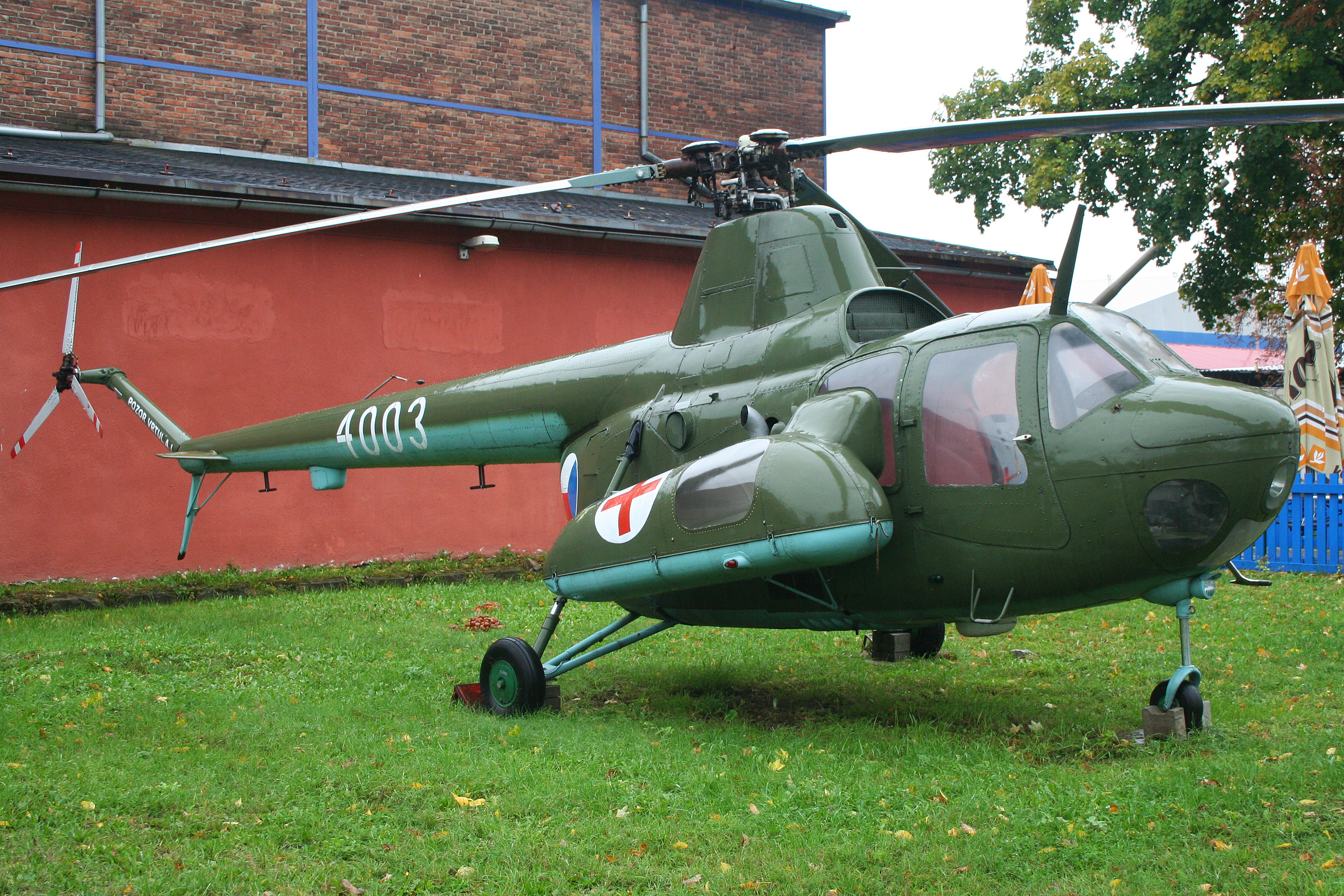
Mil Mi-1

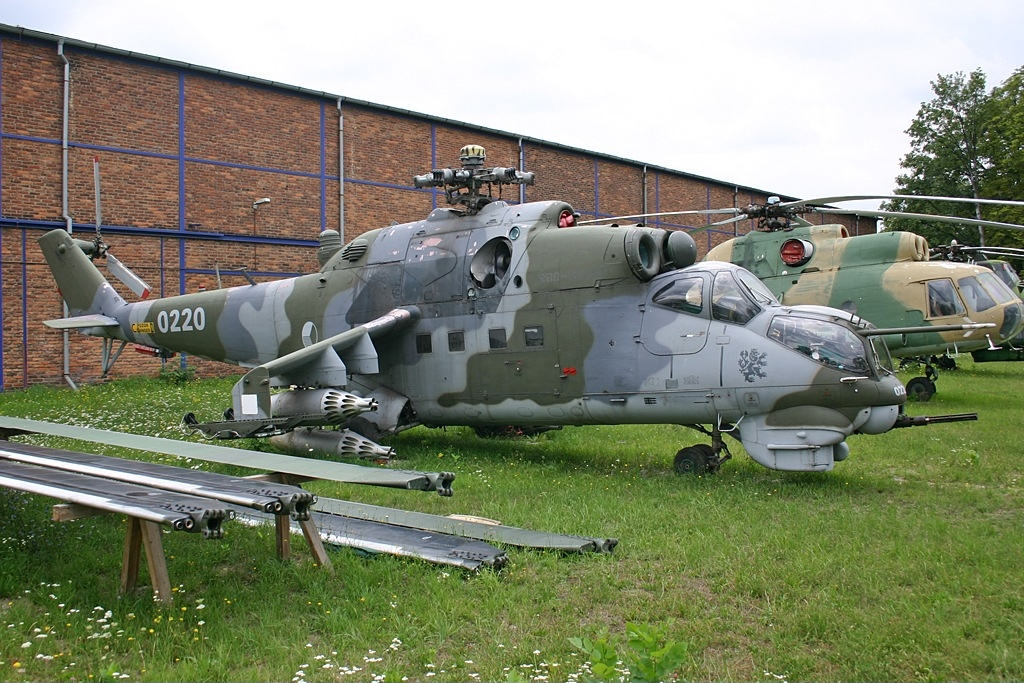
Mil Mi-24

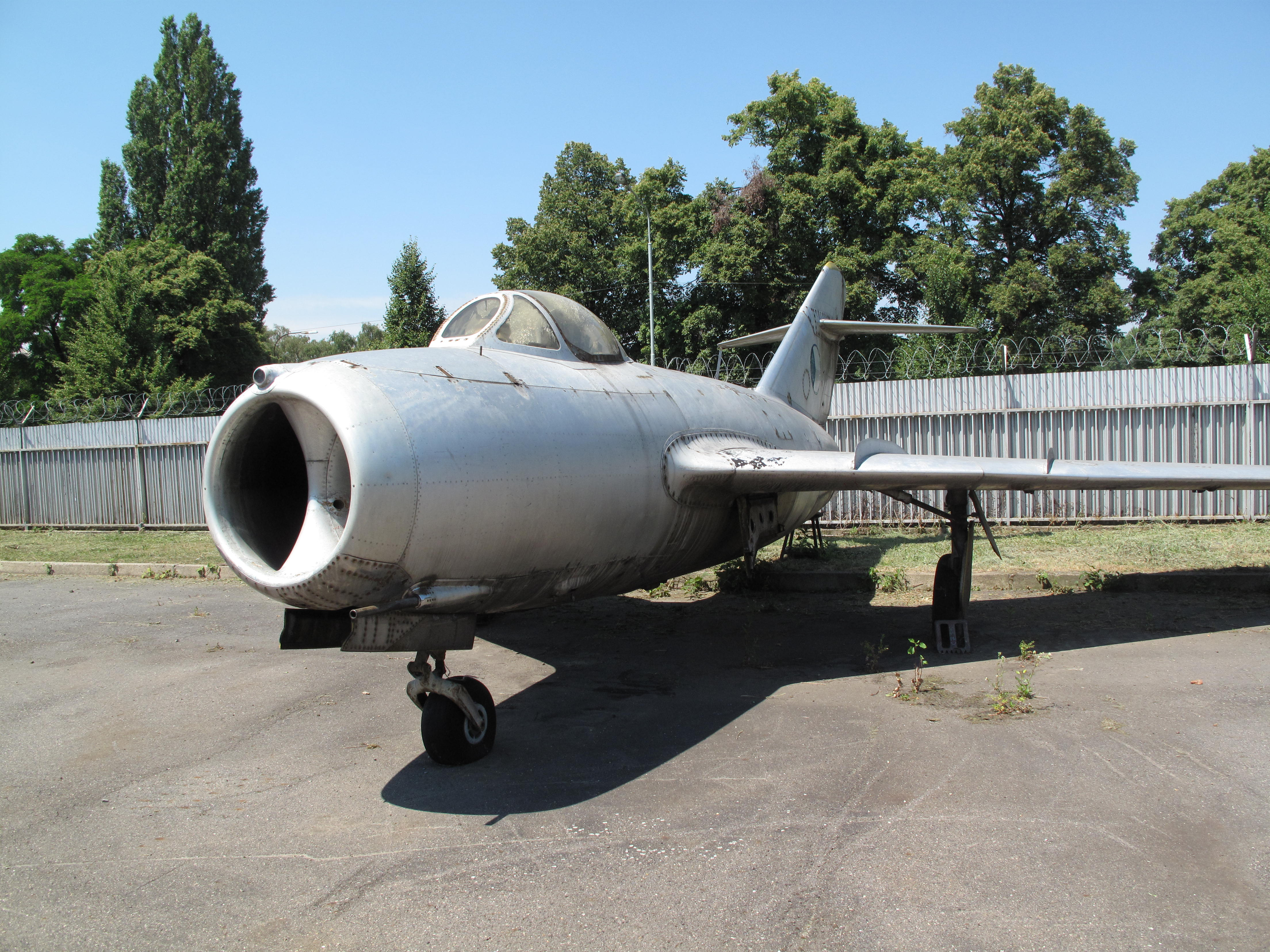
Mig-15

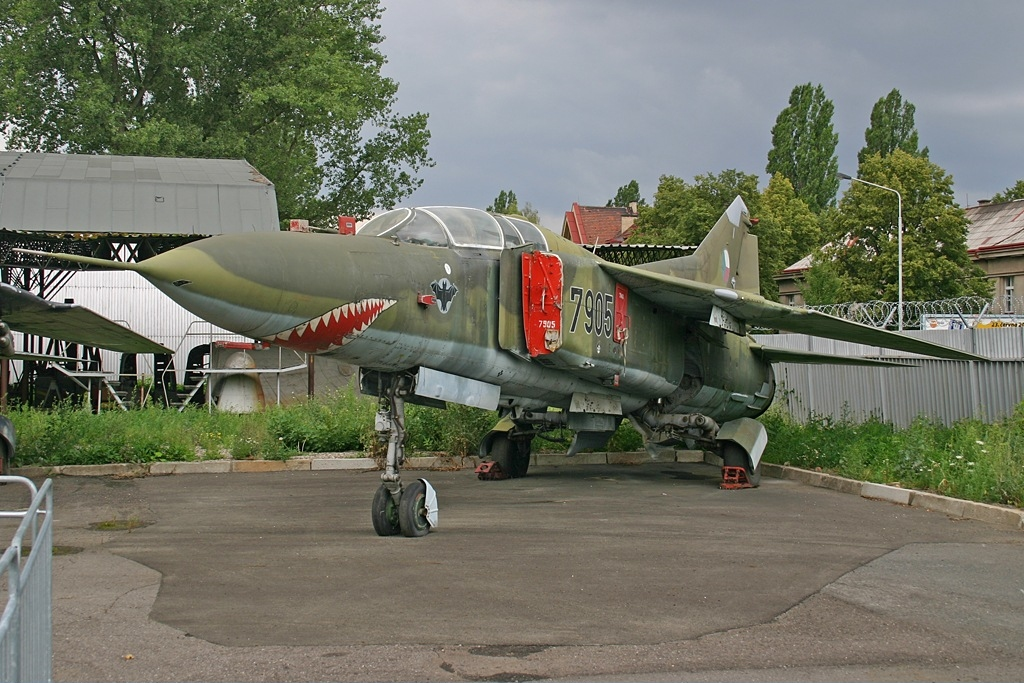
Mig-23

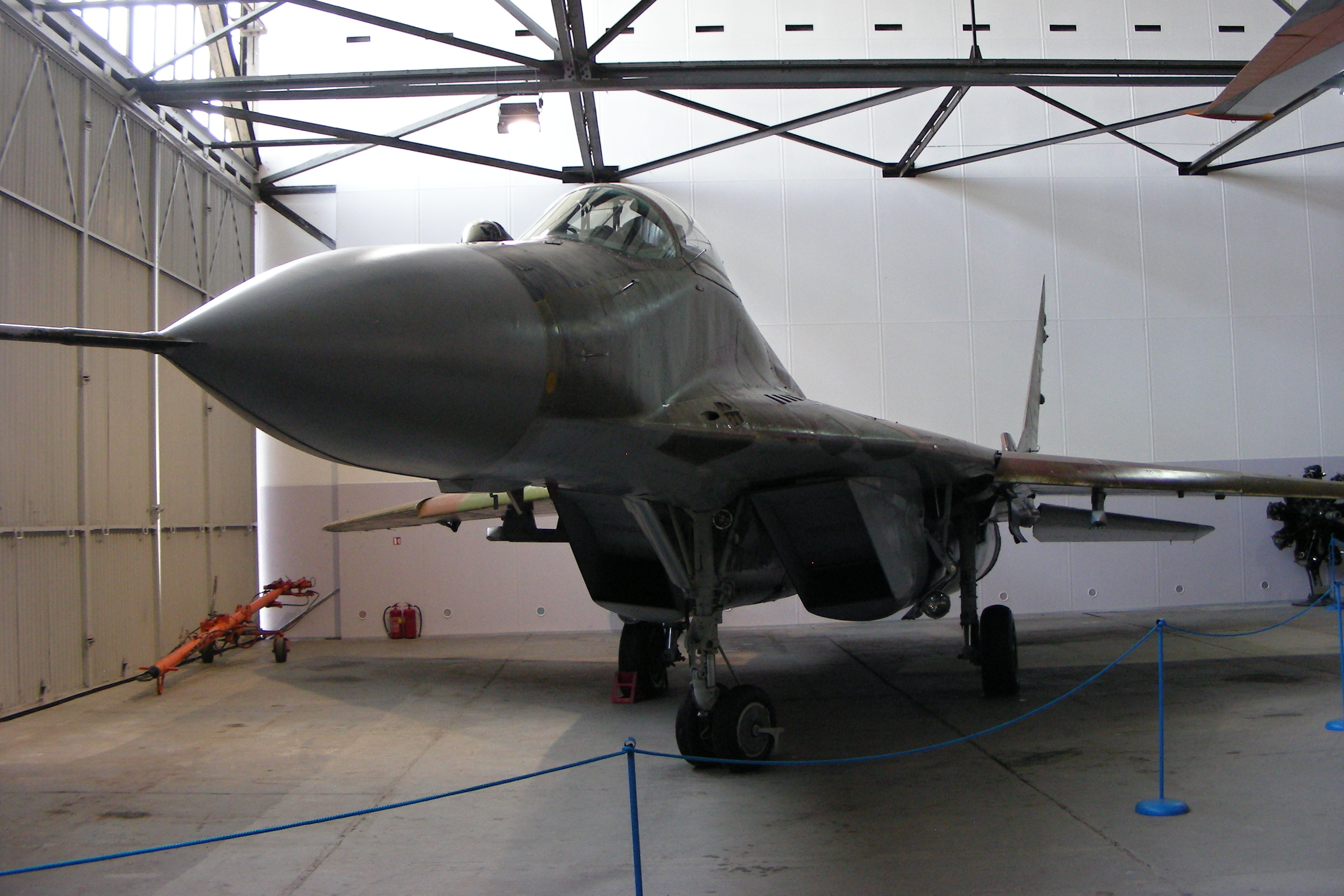
Mig-29

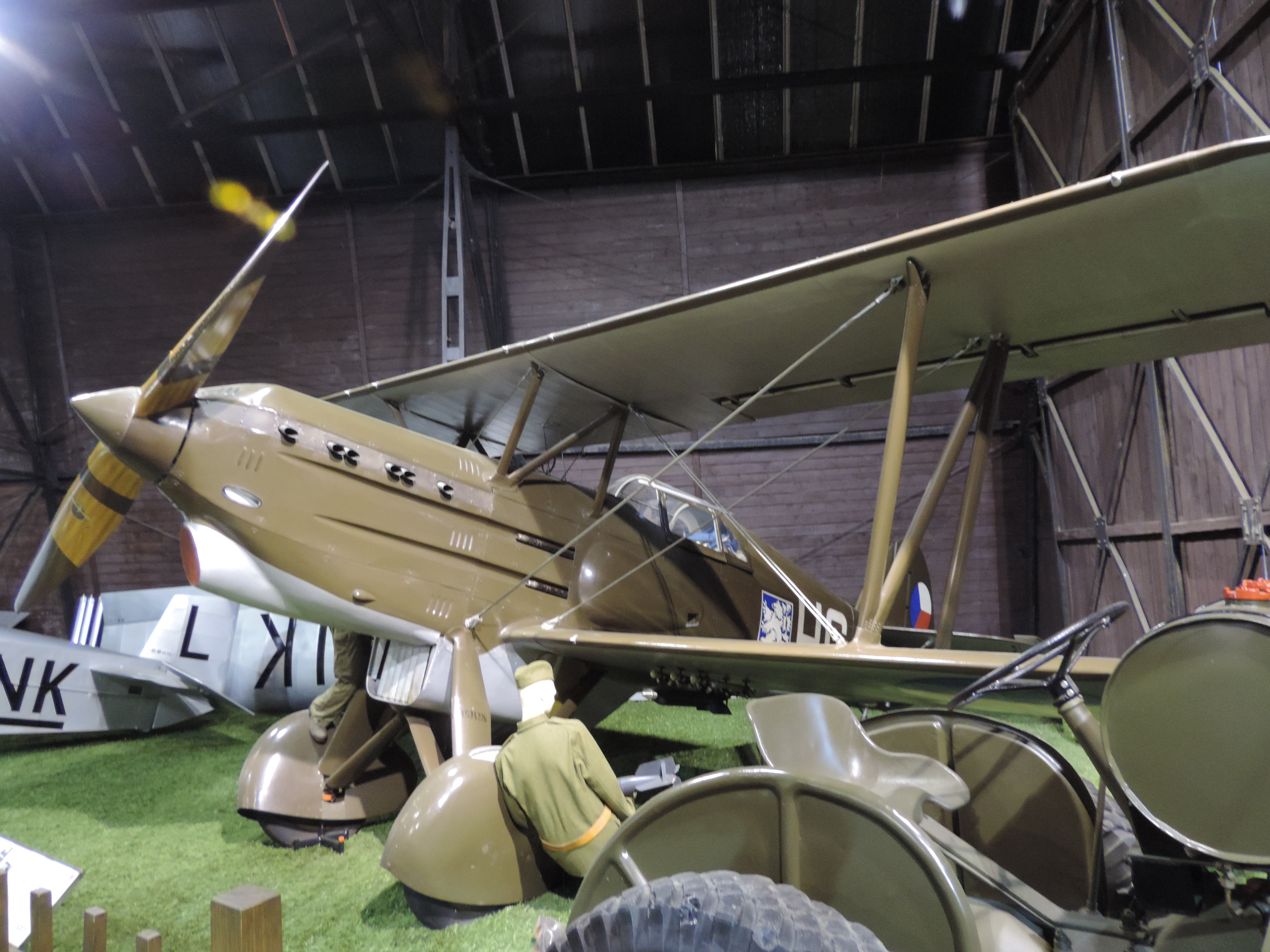
Czech Avia B-534

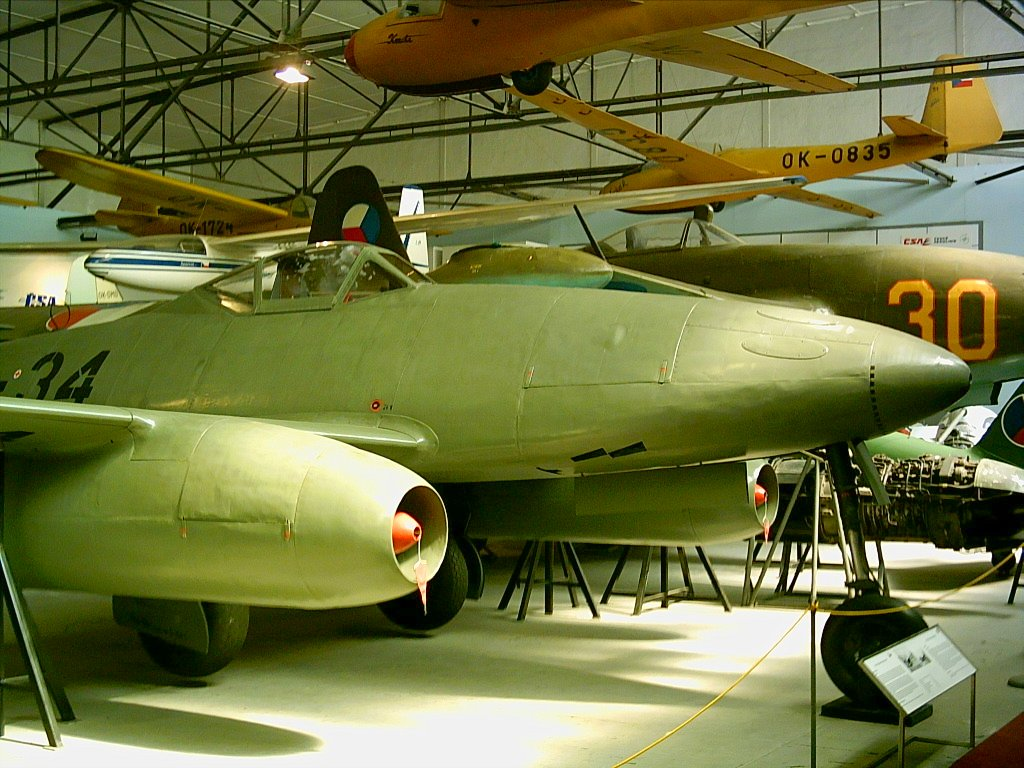
Czech Avia S-92

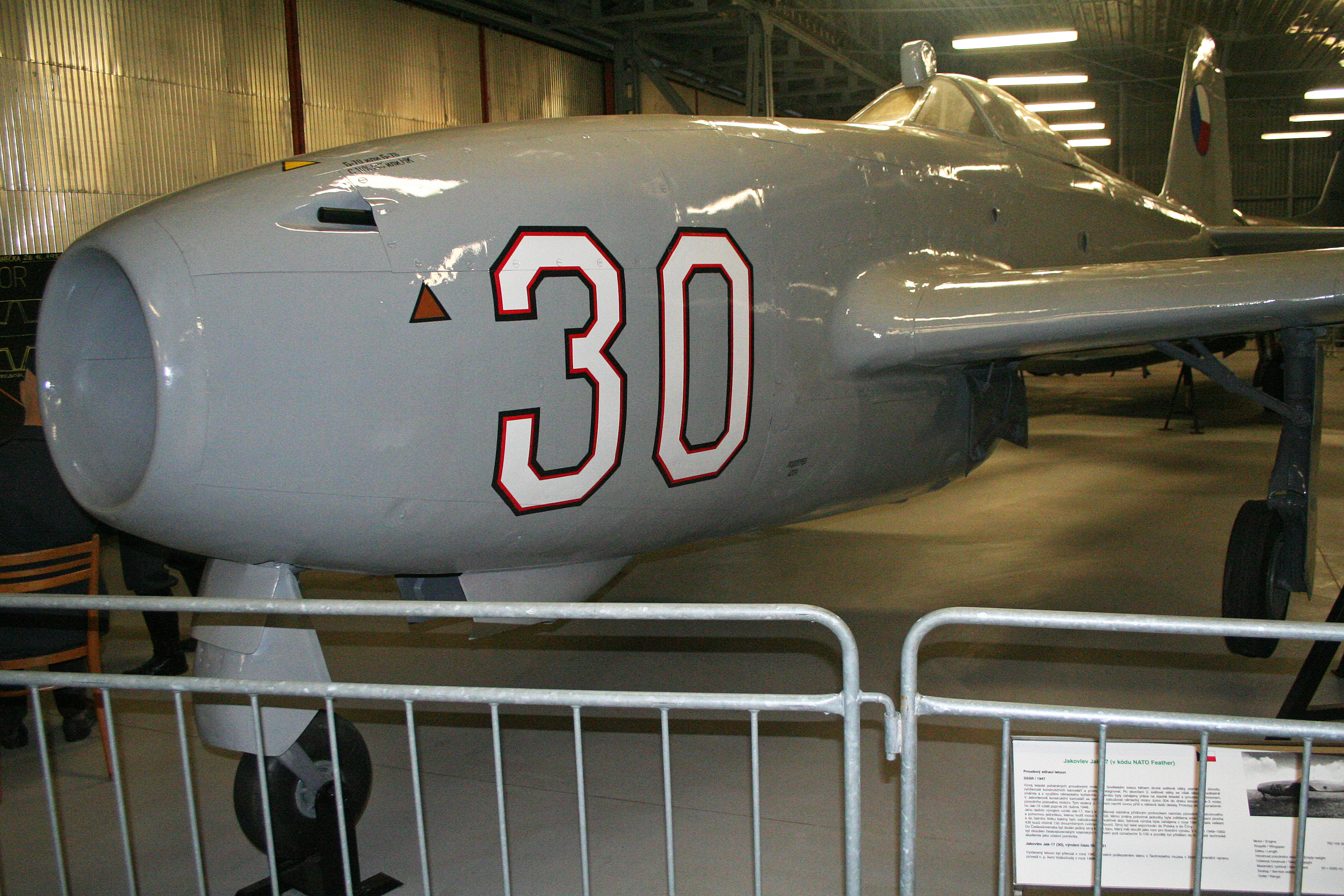
Yakovlev Yak-17

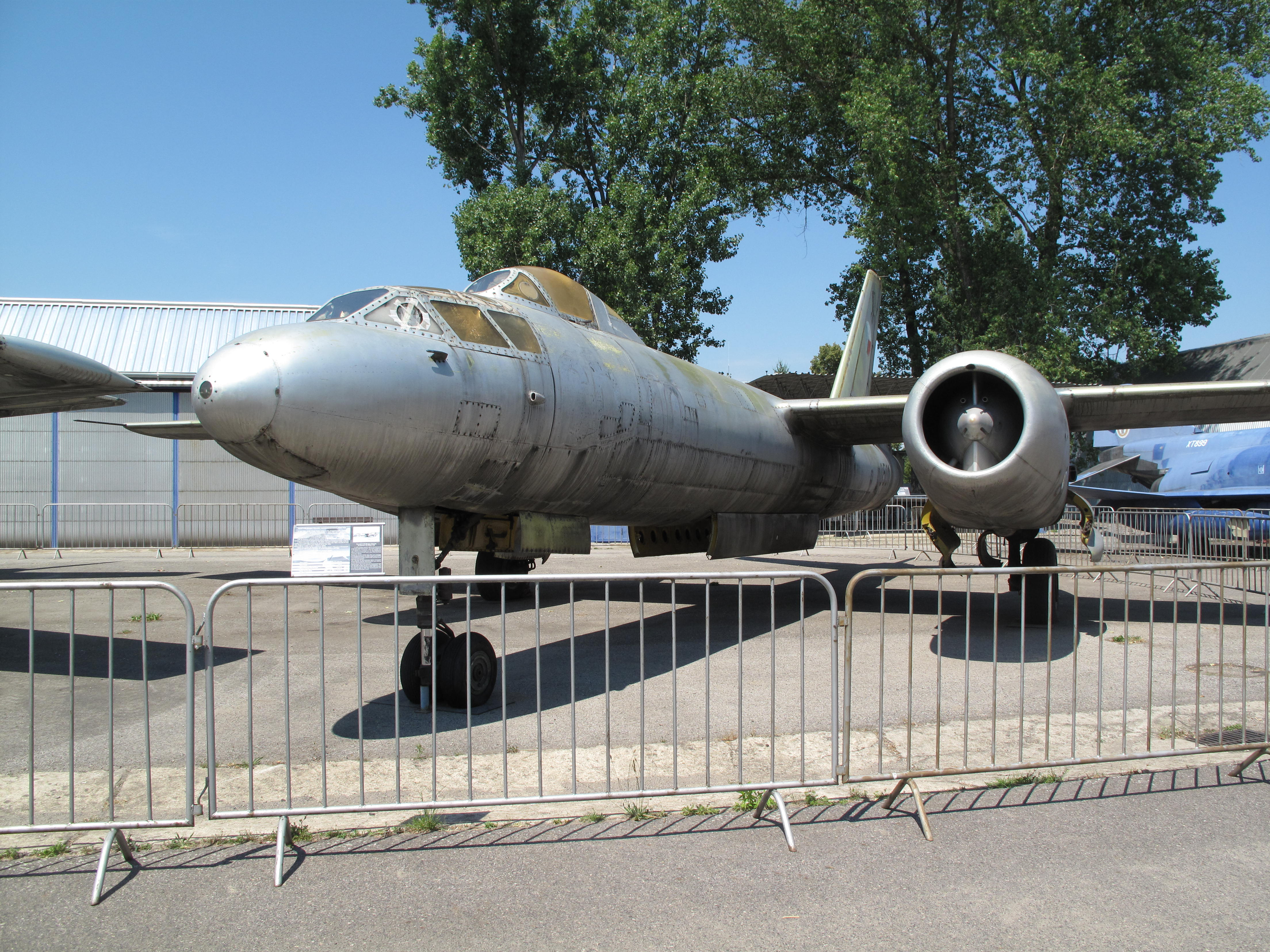
Bomber Ilyushin Il-28 Beagle

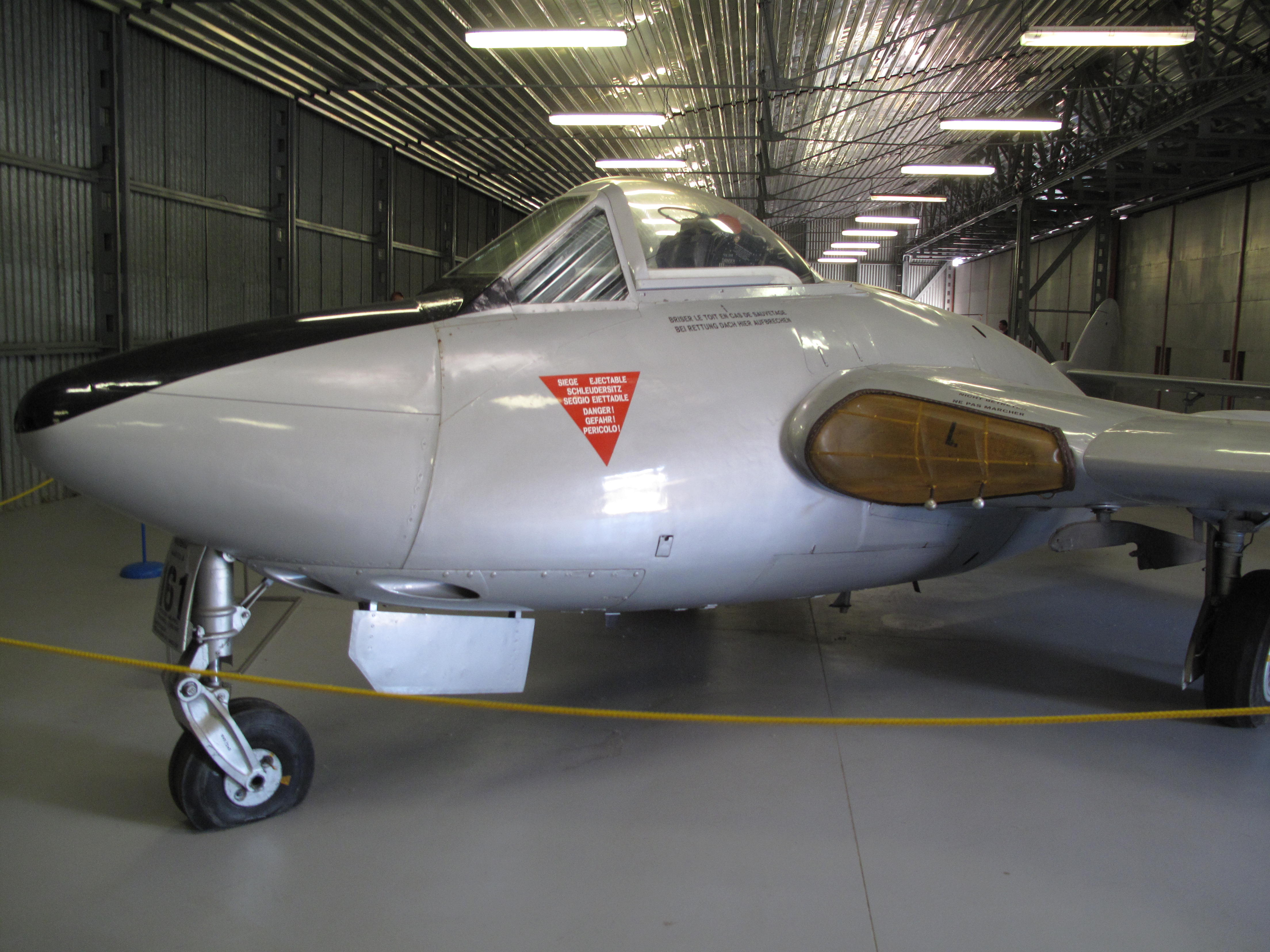
de Havilland Vampire

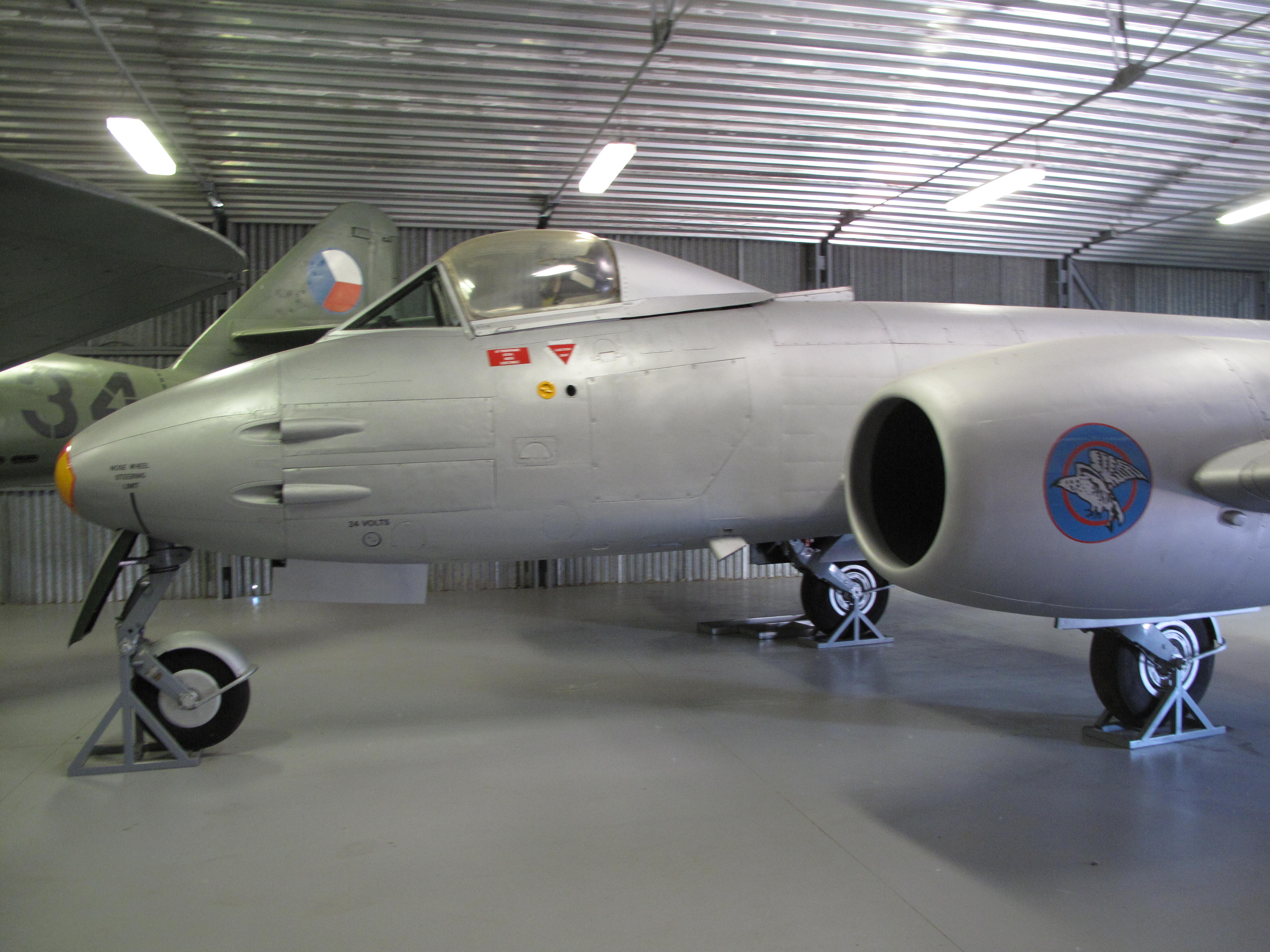
Gloster Meteor F Mk.8

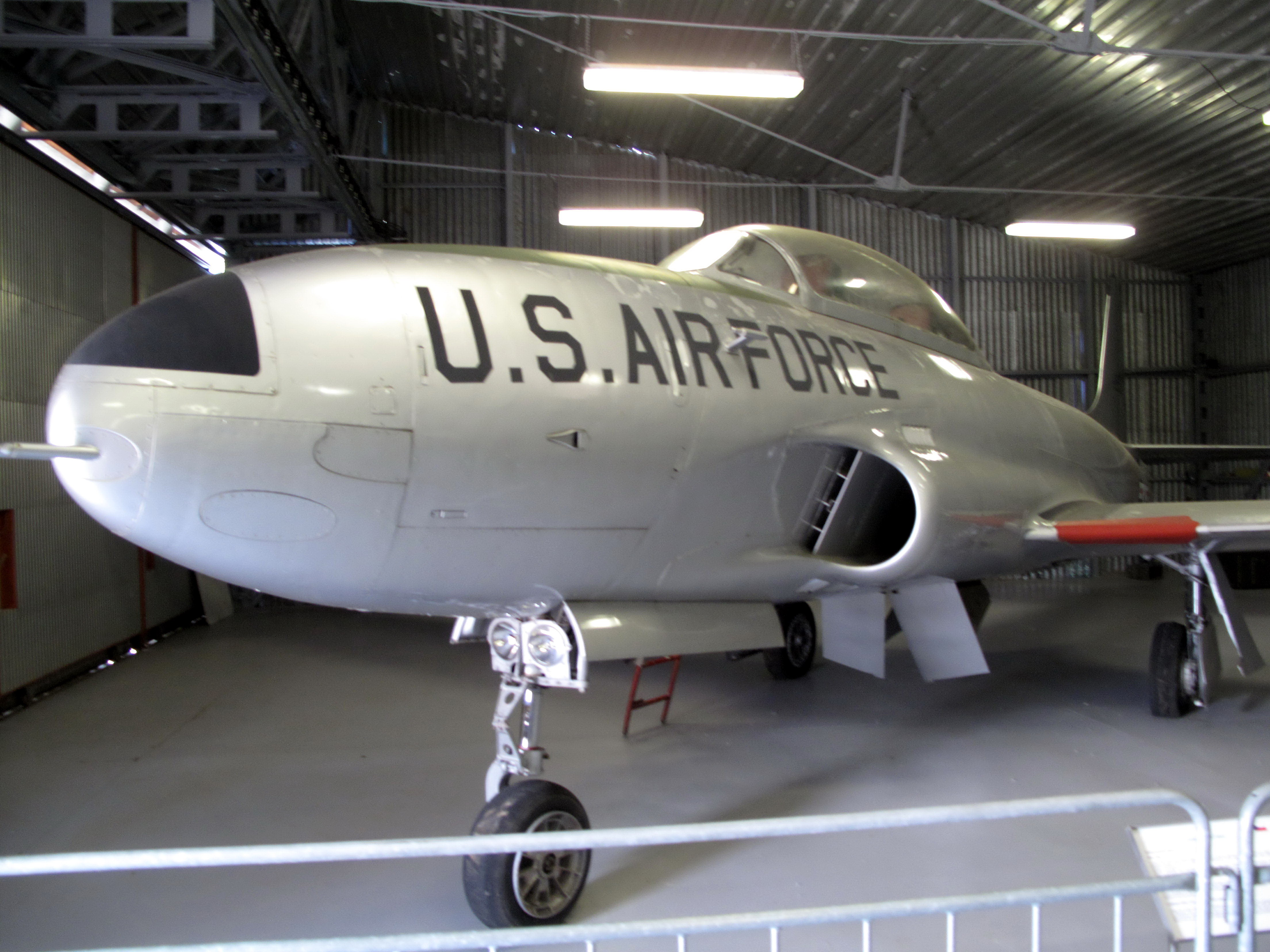
Lockheed T-33

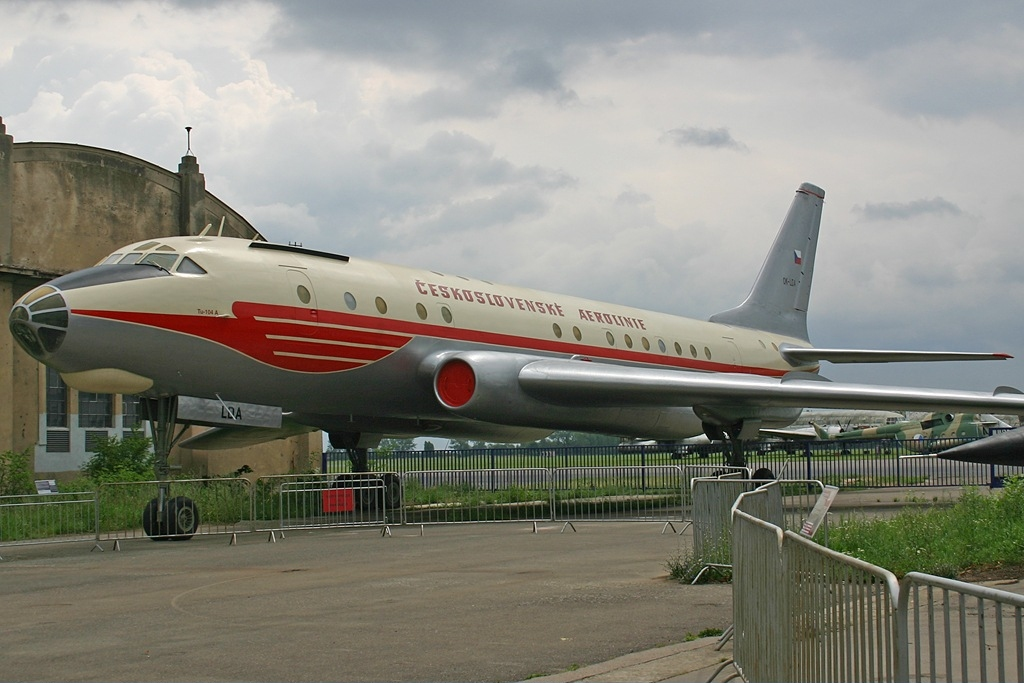
Tupolev Tu-104

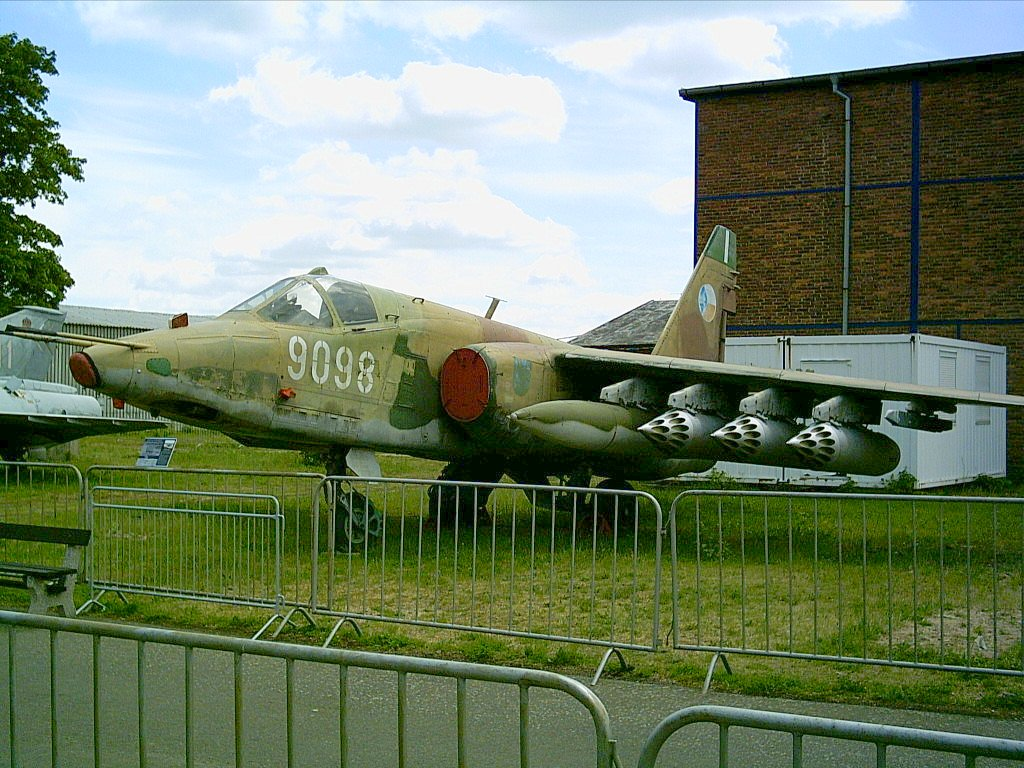
Sukhoi Su-25

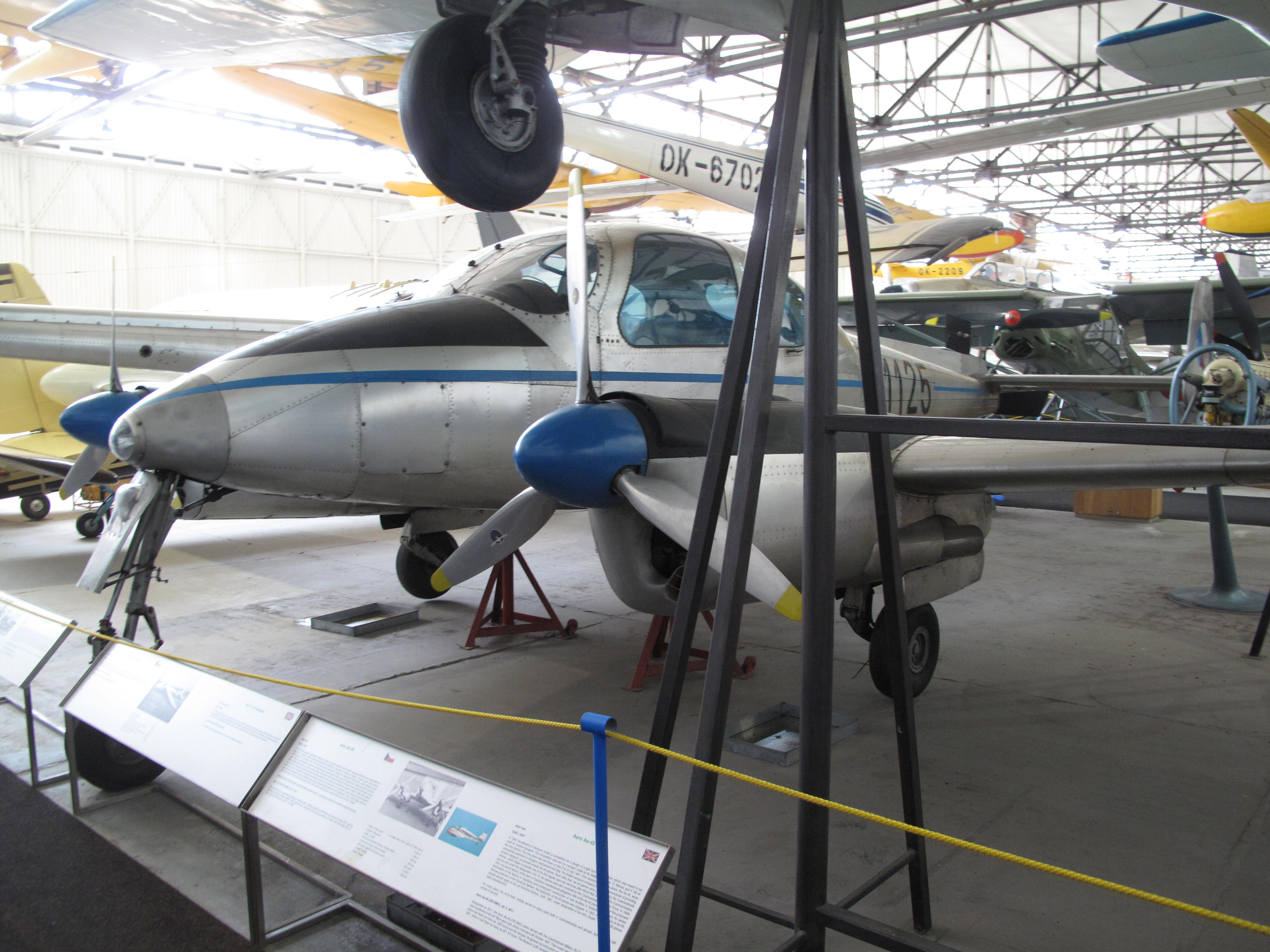
Let L-200 Morava

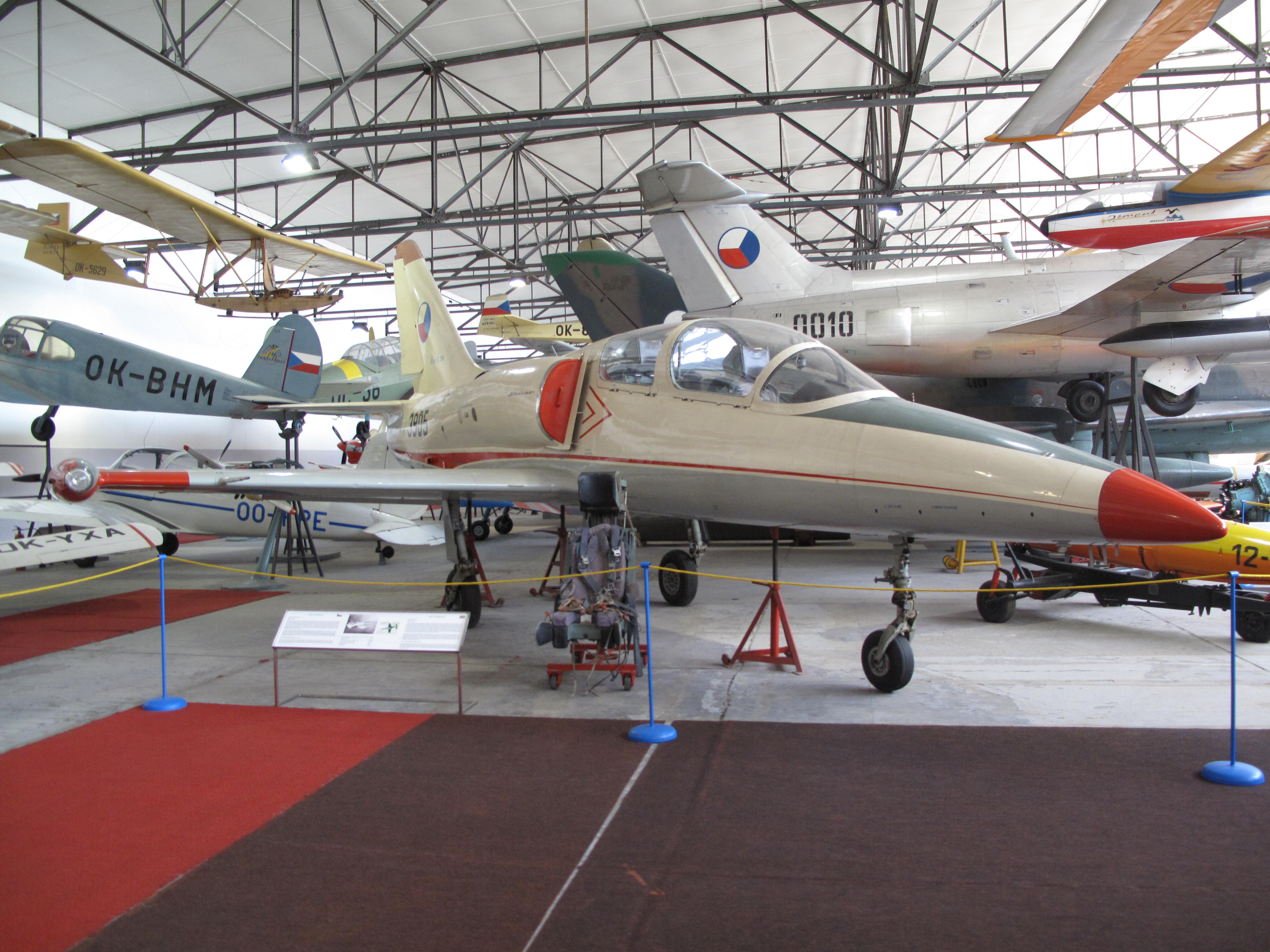
Aero L-39 Albatros

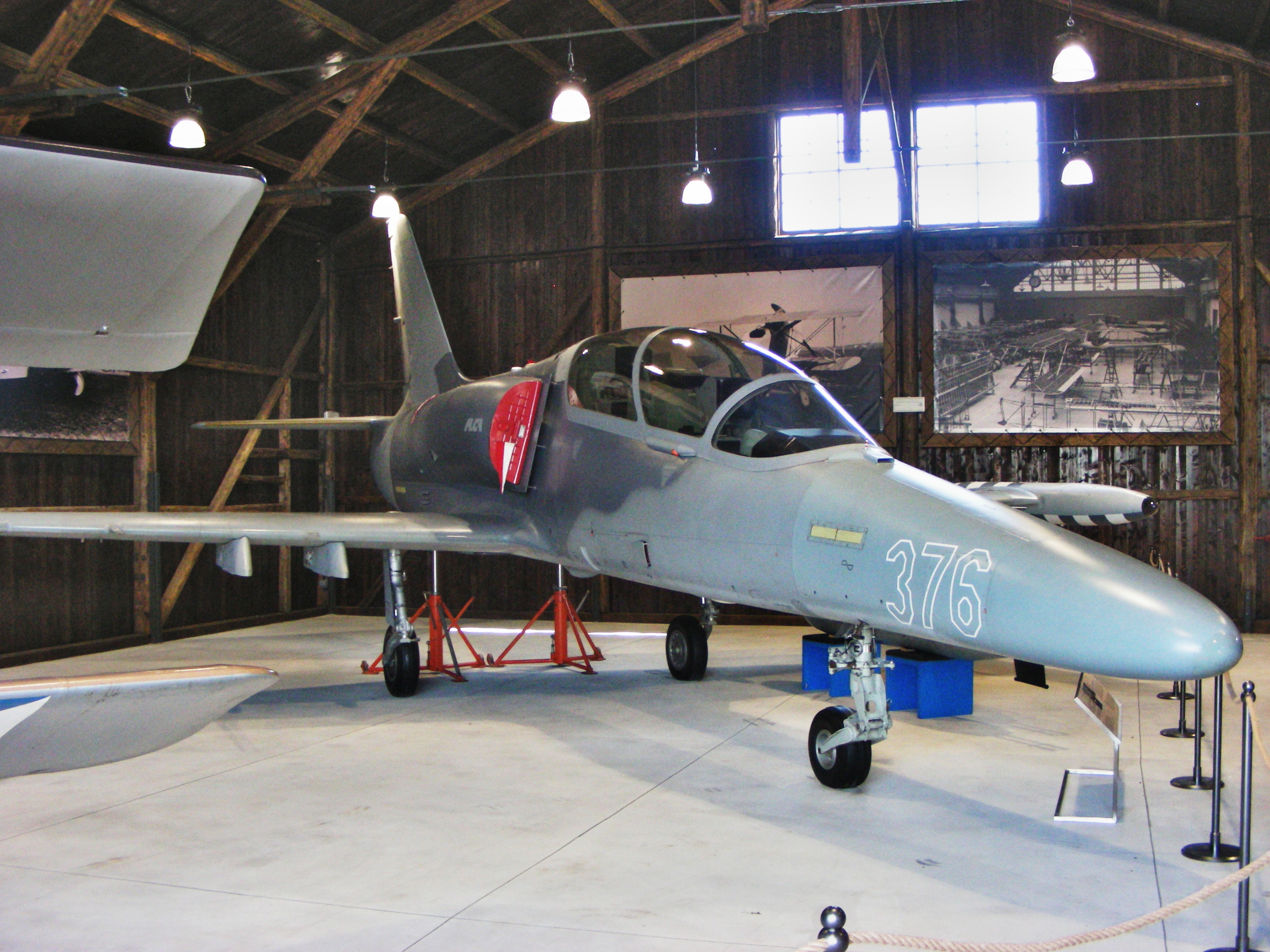
Aero L-159 Alca

== See also ==
- List of aerospace museums
- Kbely Airport
- National Technical Museum (Prague)
