= Miroslav Kostelka =

Czech diplomat and politician

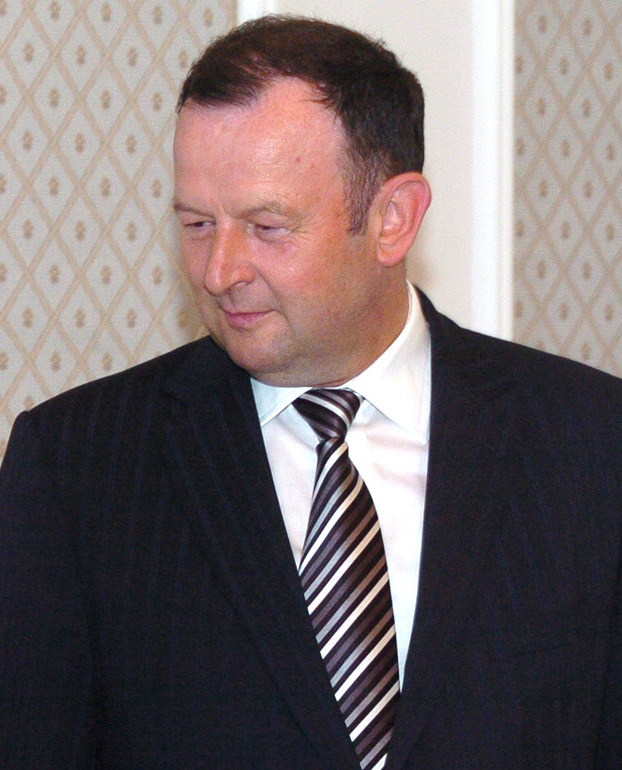

Minister of Defence
- In office 9 June 2003 – 4 August 2004
- Prime Minister: Vladimír Špidla
- Preceded by: Jaroslav Tvrdík
- Succeeded by: Karel Kühnl

Czech Republic Ambassador to Russia
- In office 2005–2009
- President: Václav Klaus
- Preceded by: Jaroslav Bašta
- Succeeded by: Petr Kolář

Personal details
- Born: 31 January 1951 (age 75) Františkovy Lázně, Czechoslovakia

Miroslav Kostelka (born 31 January 1951) is a Czech diplomat and politician.

== Career ==
He served as the Ambassador Extraordinary and Plenipotentiary of the Czech Republic to the Russian Federation in 2005–2009. In 2003–2004 he served in the cabinet of Vladimír Špidla as a Minister of Defence.

== See also ==
- List of Ambassadors of the Czech Republic to Russia
