= Jaroslav Bašta =

Czech politician and diplomat (1948–2024)

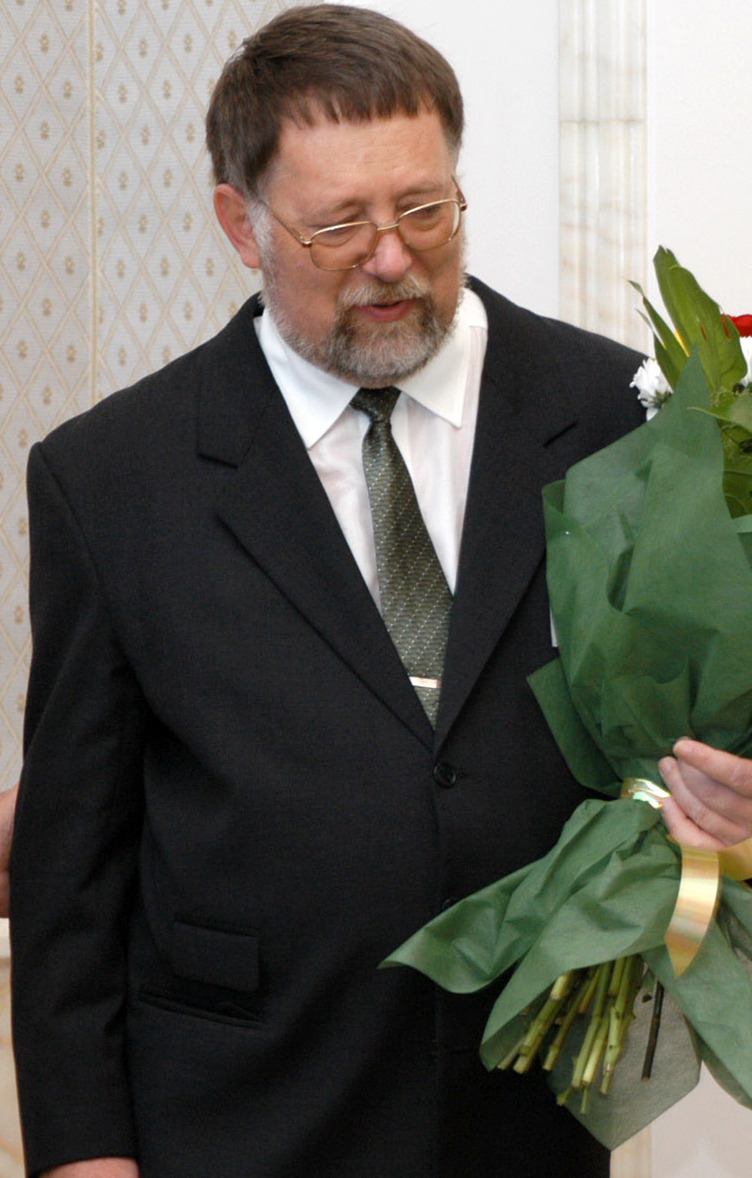
- Bašta in 2003

Minister without Portfolio
- In office 22 July 1998 – 23 March 2000
- Prime Minister: Miloš Zeman
- Preceded by: Vladimír Mlynář
- Succeeded by: Karel Březina

Czech Republic Ambassador to Russia
- In office 19 September 2000 – 2005
- President: Václav Havel; Václav Klaus
- Preceded by: Luboš Dobrovský
- Succeeded by: Miroslav Kostelka

Czech Republic Ambassador to Ukraine
- In office December 2007 – March 2010
- President: Václav Klaus
- Preceded by: Karel Štindl
- Succeeded by: Ivan Počuch

Member of the Chamber of Deputies
- In office 9 October 2021 – 7 April 2024
- In office 1 June 1996 – 14 September 2000

Personal details
- Born: 15 May 1948 Plzeň, Czechoslovakia
- Died: 8 April 2024 (aged 75)
- Party: Freedom and Direct Democracy (2021–2024)
- Other political affiliations: ČSSD (1994–2019)
- Spouse: Dara Baštová
- Children: 1
- Education: Charles University

Jaroslav Bašta (15 May 1948 – 7 April 2024) was a Czech politician and diplomat. He was a signatory of Charter 77. Between 1998 and 2000 he served in the cabinet of Miloš Zeman as Minister without portfolio. Bašta became the Ambassador of the Czech Republic to Russia in September 2000. He served for five years in Russia, later becoming Ambassador of the Czech Republic to Ukraine, where he worked for three years until stepping down for health reasons in 2010.

In 2021, he was elected to the Chamber of Deputies for Freedom and Direct Democracy (SPD).

On 10 September 2022, SPD announced it would nominate Bašta for the 2023 Czech presidential election. He was also endorsed by the Tricolour Citizens' Movement and the Workers' Party of Social Justice (DSSS). He finished fifth of eight candidates in the first round on 14 January 2023, with 4.45% of the vote.

Bašta died after a long illness on 7 April 2024, aged 75.

== See also ==
- List of ambassadors of the Czech Republic to Russia
