= Luboš Dobrovský =

Czech journalist (1932–2020)

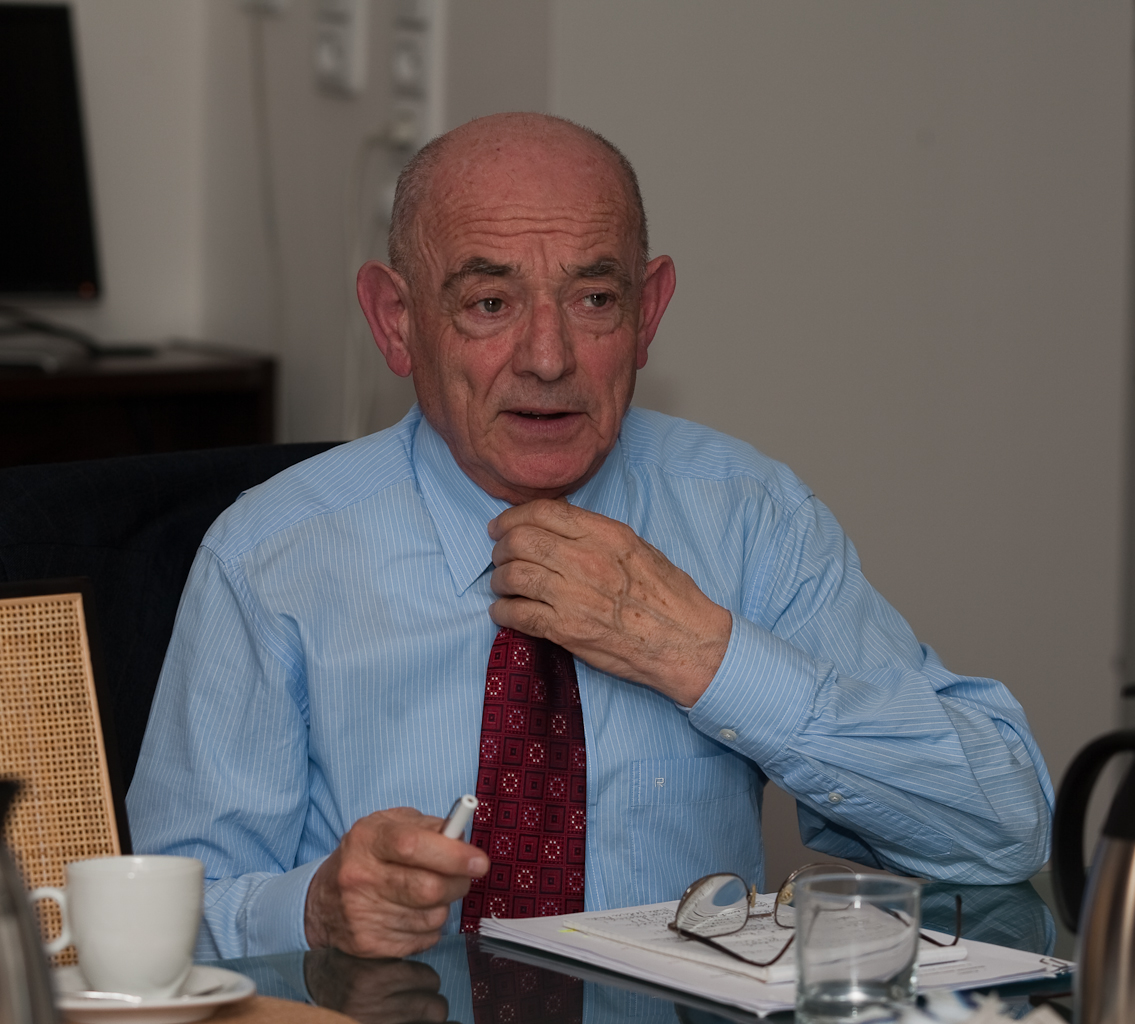

Minister of Defence of Czechoslovakia
- In office 18 October 1990 – 2 July 1992
- Prime Minister: Marián Čalfa
- Preceded by: Miroslav Vacek
- Succeeded by: Imrich Andrejčák

Czech Republic Ambassador to Russia
- In office 1996–2000
- President: Václav Havel
- Preceded by: Rudolf Slánský Jr.
- Succeeded by: Jaroslav Bašta

Personal details
- Born: Luboš Hamerschlag; 3 February 1932 Kolín, Czechoslovakia
- Died: 30 January 2020 (aged 87) Prague, Czech Republic

Luboš Dobrovský (born Luboš Hamerschlag, 3 February 1932 – 30 January 2020) was a Czech journalist and politician, who served as Czechoslovak Minister of Defence.

== Biography ==
Dobrovsky's father Ludvík Hamerschlag was Jewish. Deported to Auschwitz concentration camp in September 1943, he did not survive the war. Dobrovský and his mother spent the war on a farm in Ohrada, whilst she remarried the officer Josef Dobrovský afterwards.

Dobrovský was member of Communist Party of Czechoslovakia and journalist of the Czechoslovak Radio between 1959 and 1968. He signed Charta 77 in the 1970s and served as a spokesman of the Civic Forum in 1989. Between October 1990 and June 1992, Dobrovský was the Czechoslovak minister of defence, after which he served as director of the Office of the Czech President Václav Havel. Between 1996 and 2000, Dobrovský was the Czech Ambassador in Moscow.

Dobrovský died on 30 January 2020 at the age of 87. His cause of death was unknown.

Government offices
| Preceded by Miroslav Vacek | Minister of Defence of Czechoslovakia; 1990–1992 | Succeeded by Imrich Andrejčák |
