= List of ambassadors of the Czech Republic to Russia =

The following is a list of ambassadors of the Czech Republic to Russia.

- 1993–1996 Rudolf Slánský Jr.
- 1996–2000 Luboš Dobrovský
- 2000–2005 Jaroslav Bašta
- 2005–2009 Miroslav Kostelka
- 2010–2012 Petr Kolář
- 2014–2018 Vladimír Remek
- 2018–present Vítězslav Pivoňka

== See also ==
- Czech Republic–Russia relations
