= Prague 19 =

Prague 19 Praha 19
- Municipal District of Prague; Administrative District of Prague
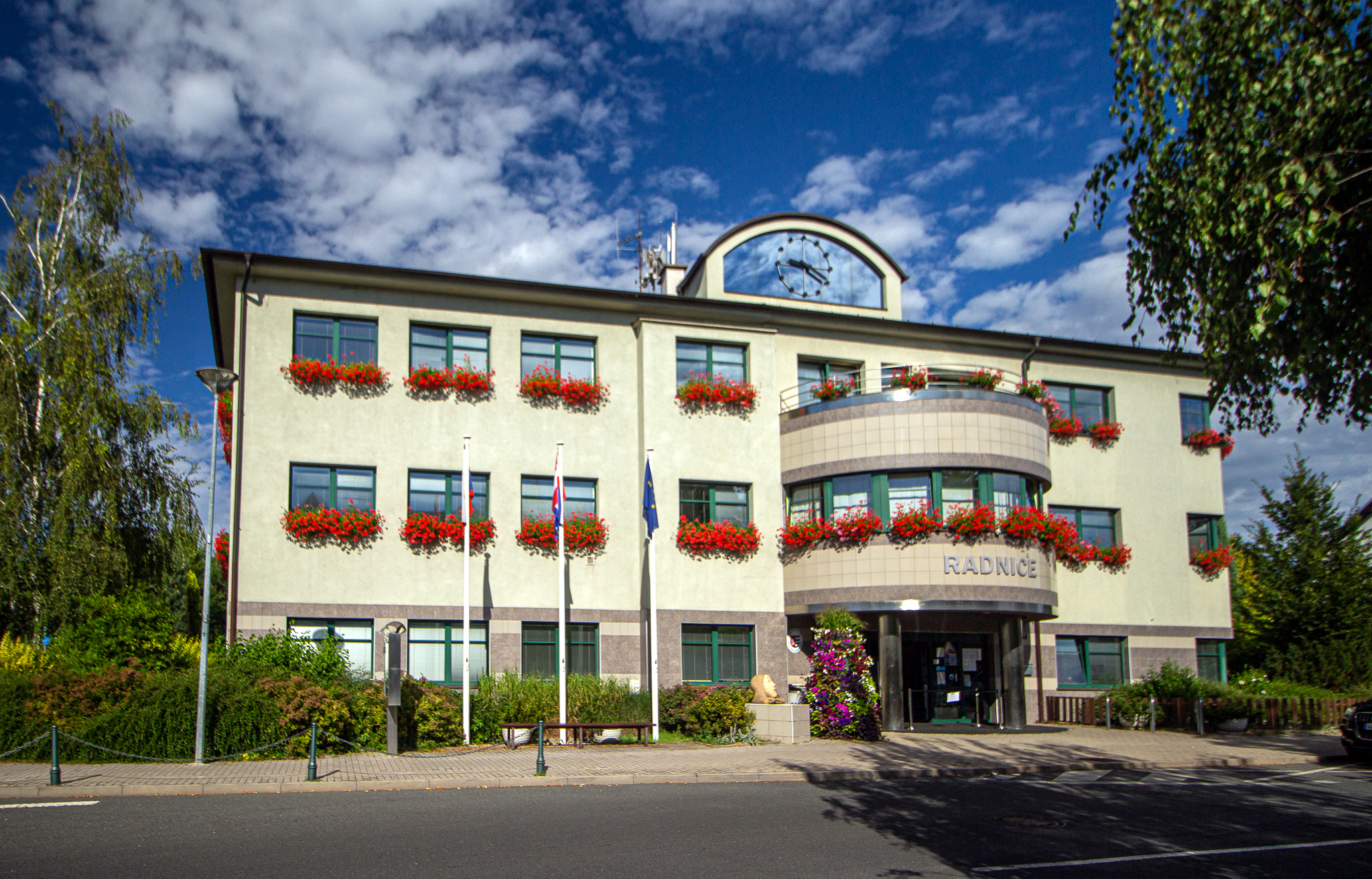
- Prague 19 town hall

- Flag Coat of arms

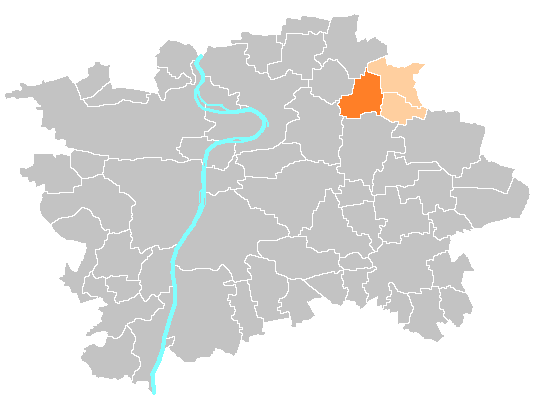
- Location of Prague 19 in Prague
- Coordinates: 50°8′0″N 14°32′58″E
- Country: Czech Republic
- Region: Prague

Government
  - Mayor: Pavel Žďárský

Area
  - Total: 5.99 km^{2} (2.31 sq mi)

Population (2021)
  - Total: 7,216
  - Density: 1,200/km^{2} (3,120/sq mi)
- Time zone: UTC+1 (CET)
  - Summer (DST): UTC+2 (CEST)
- Postal code: 197 00
- Website: https://www.praha19.cz

Prague 19, also known as Kbely (German: Gbel), is a municipal district (městská část) in Prague. It is located in the north-eastern part of the city. It is formed by one cadastre, Kbely. As of 2008, there were 6,149 inhabitants living in Prague 19.

The administrative district (správní obvod) of the same name consists of municipal districts Prague 19, Satalice and Vinoř.

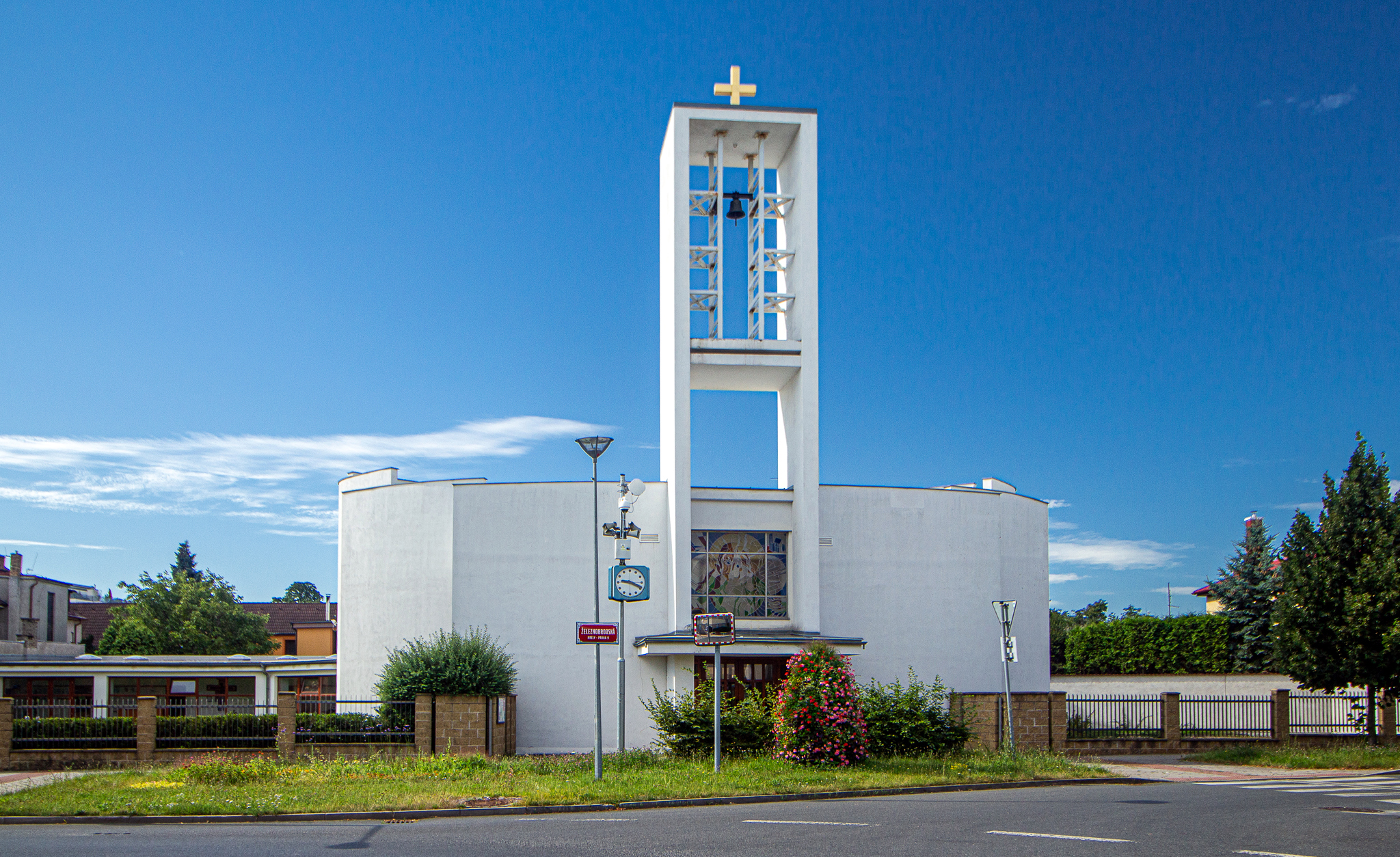
Church of Saint Elisabeth in Kbely

== Climate ==
Climate data for Kbely (1991−2020)
Month	Jan	Feb	Mar	Apr	May	Jun	Jul	Aug	Sep	Oct	Nov	Dec	Year
Record high °C (°F)	17.0 (62.6)	18.5 (65.3)	22.4 (72.3)	30.2 (86.4)	31.2 (88.2)	37.0 (98.6)	36.7 (98.1)	38.0 (100.4)	32.9 (91.2)	26.1 (79.0)	18.9 (66.0)	14.1 (57.4)	38.0 (100.4)
Mean daily maximum °C (°F)	2.3 (36.1)	4.1 (39.4)	8.7 (47.7)	14.9 (58.8)	19.4 (66.9)	22.5 (72.5)	24.8 (76.6)	24.8 (76.6)	19.4 (66.9)	13.2 (55.8)	7.0 (44.6)	3.2 (37.8)	13.7 (56.6)
Daily mean °C (°F)	−0.1 (31.8)	1.0 (33.8)	4.6 (40.3)	9.9 (49.8)	14.3 (57.7)	17.8 (64.0)	19.8 (67.6)	19.4 (66.9)	14.6 (58.3)	9.3 (48.7)	4.4 (39.9)	0.9 (33.6)	9.7 (49.4)
Mean daily minimum °C (°F)	−3.0 (26.6)	−2.5 (27.5)	0.4 (32.7)	4.3 (39.7)	8.8 (47.8)	12.4 (54.3)	14.3 (57.7)	13.9 (57.0)	9.7 (49.5)	5.4 (41.7)	1.5 (34.7)	−1.8 (28.8)	5.3 (41.5)
Record low °C (°F)	−23.1 (−9.6)	−20.9 (−5.6)	−15.7 (3.7)	−7.2 (19.0)	−2.1 (28.2)	2.6 (36.7)	7.0 (44.6)	5.1 (41.2)	0.5 (32.9)	−7.5 (18.5)	−11.7 (10.9)	−22.8 (−9.0)	−23.1 (−9.6)
Average precipitation mm (inches)	22.3 (0.88)	21.3 (0.84)	31.3 (1.23)	26.7 (1.05)	59.5 (2.34)	70.5 (2.78)	70.1 (2.76)	64.9 (2.56)	45.1 (1.78)	34.2 (1.35)	30.8 (1.21)	29.0 (1.14)	505.7 (19.92)
Average precipitation days (≥ 1.0 mm)	6.8	5.8	7.8	6.5	9.2	9.5	9.2	8.8	6.9	7.3	7.2	6.7	91.7
Mean monthly sunshine hours	47.3	77.9	120.9	187.8	224	232.3	242.4	231	161.7	104.1	49.6	41.8	1,720.8
Source: NOAA

== Demographics ==
Historical population
Year	Pop.	±%
1869	677	—
1880	898	+32.6%
1890	1,054	+17.4%
1900	1,322	+25.4%
1910	1,518	+14.8%
1921	1,765	+16.3%
1930	5,546	+214.2%
1950	5,884	+6.1%
1961	6,929	+17.8%
1970	6,698	−3.3%
1980	5,688	−15.1%
1991	4,669	−17.9%
2001	4,592	−1.6%
2011	6,768	+47.4%
2021	7,216	+6.6%
Source: Censuses

== See also ==
- Prague Aviation Museum, Kbely
