= Hero of the German Democratic Republic =

State award of the German Democratic Republic

Hero of the German Democratic Republic Held der Deutschen Demokratischen Republik (German)
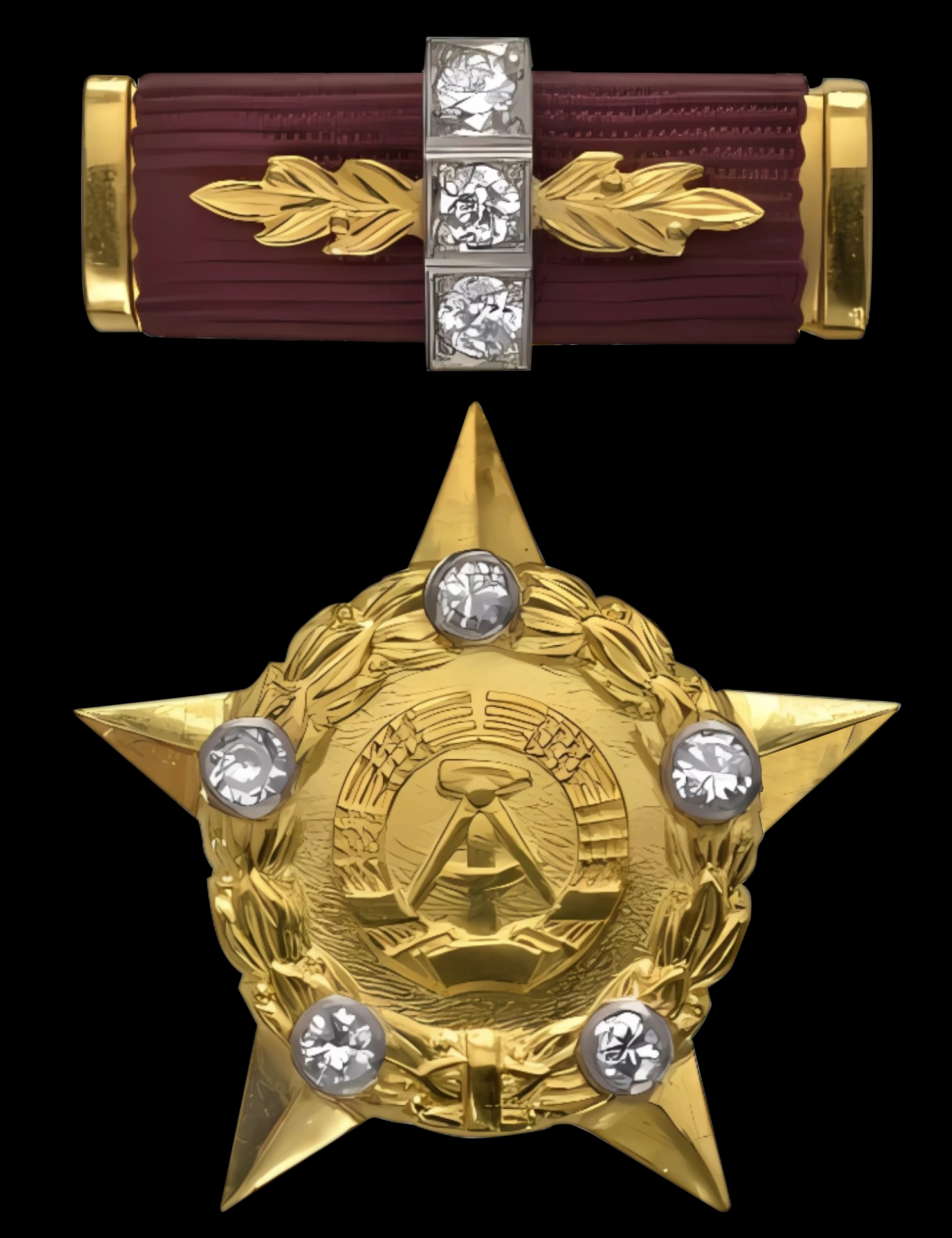
- 1977 – 1987 pattern

Awarded by the Socialist Unity Party
- Type: State
- Established: 29 October 1975
- Country: East Germany
- Eligibility: Personnel of the National People's Army, East German civilians, or foreign nationals under extraordinary circumstances
- Criteria: Extraordinary service or heroism on behalf of the German Democratic Republic
- Status: Defunct

Statistics
- First induction: 28 November 1975
- Last induction: 1987
- Total inductees: 11

Precedence
- Next (lower): Order of Karl Marx

Hero of the German Democratic Republic (GDR) was an honorific title awarded by the former East German state, accompanied by a certificate and medal. The title was instituted by the politburo of the Socialist Unity Party on 29 October 1975 as the most prestigious award of the GDR and first awarded on 28 November 1975.

In total, it was awarded on 17 occasions to 11 recipients. Due to the fact that East Germany was never at war during its 40 years of existence, the award was never presented for extraordinary heroism in combat.

One of the most prominent recipients was cosmonaut and East German air force officer Sigmund Jähn, the first German ever to fly into space, and the last living Hero of the GDR by the time of his death in September 2019. Jähn also received the award and title of Hero of the Soviet Union, which Hero of the GDR was modeled after.

== Award criteria ==
The title could be awarded to people who had—by rendering extraordinary service or acts of heroism—contributed to the development and strengthening of the German Democratic Republic, its international standing and authority, or its military security. A demonstration of commitment to duty and the willingness to make personal sacrifice were required, as were proven bravery and audacity. The following categories of person were generally eligible to receive the award:

- Combatants who had been engaged in military opposition or unlawful civilian resistance against fascism
- Servicemen of the National People's Army and the other armed services of the GDR
- Civilians working in cooperation with the armed services of the GDR
- Foreign nationals in exceptional circumstances
- Cosmonauts, who received the honour at the same time as being awarded the special honorific title Cosmonaut of the German Democratic Republic

== Medal and privileges ==
Following the example of the Soviet honorific title Hero of the Soviet Union, the award Hero of the GDR entitled the holder to wear a five-pointed gold star medal, be presented with a certificate, and receive a financial reward. Both the medal and the certificate were to be returned to the state upon the death of the recipient.

After 1978, recipients were also required to be awarded the Order of Karl Marx., in similar fashion to how Heroes of the Soviet Union were also awarded the Order of Lenin, a Hero of the People's Republic of Bulgaria was also awarded the Order of Georgi Dimitrov, and a Hero of the Czechoslovak Socialist Republic was always also awarded the Order of Klement Gottwald.

Originally, an annual quota of 10 awards was envisaged. Recipients could receive the award multiple times, resulting in some being honoured as 'twice Hero', or—solely in the case of Leader of the Soviet Union, Leonid Brezhnev—'three times Hero' of the GDR.

== History ==
The new title was first awarded on 28 November 1975 to General of the National People's Army, Heinz Hoffmann, on the occasion of his 65th birthday.

The first foreign national to be honoured as a Hero of the GDR was Leonid Brezhnev, on 13 December 1976. Brezhnev also received the award in 1979 and again in 1981.

Only two of the original 11 recipients are still alive: the cosmonauts Vladimir Kovalyonok and Aleksander Ivanchenkov, who crewed EO-2 of the Soviet orbital space station Salyut 6. Sigmund Jähn (d. 2019) was the last citizen of the former GDR to bear the title, as both Kovalyonok and Ivanchenkov are Russian (formerly USSR) citizens.

== Recipients ==
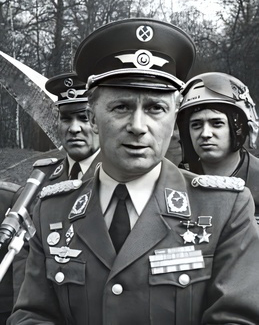
Cosmonaut Col. Sigmund Jähn wearing the medals of a Hero of the GDR (left on upper left breast) and a Hero of the Soviet Union (right on upper left breast) in April 1981 at Trollenhagen Air Base in Neubrandenburg, GDR.

=== Members of the GDR Government ===
- 1975 & 1980: Heinz Hoffmann (National Defence Minister)
- 1975 & 1982: Erich Mielke (State Security Minister)
- 1975 & 1983: Friedrich Dickel (Interior Minister)
- 1982 & 1987: Erich Honecker (Head of Party & State)
- 1984: Willi Stoph (Prime Minister & Head of State)

=== Members of the USSR Government ===
- 1976, 1979 & 1981: Leonid Brezhnev
- 1985: Nikolai Tikhonov

=== Cosmonauts ===
- 1978: Sigmund Jähn
- 1978: Valery Bykovsky
- 1978: Vladimir Kovalyonok
- 1978: Alexander Ivanchenkov

== Order of precedence of awards of the GDR ==
There was a specific order of precedence laid down in its gazette for the wearing of the some 195 GDR medals and awards, devised according to the relative prestige of each honour. The following senior distinctions were to be worn on the upper left breast (top left to bottom right as viewed) in this order:

1. Hero of the GDR
2. Order of Karl Marx
3. Hero of Labour
4. Star of People's Friendship
5. Patriotic Order of Merit
6. Banner of Labour
7. Scharnhorst Order
8. Blücher Order
9. Combat Order of Merit for the People & Fatherland

== See also ==
- Orders, decorations, and medals of East Germany
