= Progress 2 =

Soviet cargo spacecraft

- Mission type: Salyut 6 resupply
- Operator: OKB-1
- COSPAR ID: 1978-070A
- SATCAT no.: 10979
- Mission duration: 27 days, 14 hours and 49 minutes

Spacecraft properties
- Spacecraft: Progress s/n 101
- Spacecraft type: Progress 7K-TG
- Manufacturer: NPO Energia
- Launch mass: 7020 kg
- Dry mass: 6520 kg
- Payload mass: 2500 kg
- Dimensions: 7.48 m in length and 2.72 m in diameter

Start of mission
- Launch date: 7 July 1978, 11:26:16 UTC
- Rocket: Soyuz-U s/n S15000-128
- Launch site: Baikonur, Site 31/6
- Contractor: OKB-1

End of mission
- Disposal: Deorbited
- Decay date: 4 August 1978, 02:15 UTC

Orbital parameters
- Reference system: Geocentric
- Regime: Low Earth
- Perigee altitude: 193 km
- Apogee altitude: 262 km
- Inclination: 51.66°
- Period: 88.7 minutes
- Epoch: 7 July 1978

Docking with Salyut 6
- Docking port: Aft
- Docking date: 9 July 1978, 12:58:59 UTC
- Undocking date: 2 August 1978, 04:57:44 UTC
- Time docked: 23 days, 15 hours and 59 minutes

Cargo
- Mass: 2500 kg
- Fuel: 600 kg

Progress 2 (Russian: Прогресс 2) was an unmanned Progress cargo spacecraft launched by the Soviet Union in 1978 to resupply the Salyut 6 space station. It used the Progress 7K-TG configuration, and was the second Progress mission to Salyut 6. It carried supplies for the EO-2 crew aboard Salyut 6, as well as equipment for conducting scientific research, and fuel for adjusting the station's orbit and performing manoeuvres.

== Spacecraft ==
Progress 2 was a Progress 7K-TG spacecraft. The second of forty three to be launched, it had the serial number 101. The Progress 7K-TG spacecraft was the first generation Progress, derived from the Soyuz 7K-T and intended for unmanned logistics missions to space stations in support of the Salyut programme. On some missions the spacecraft were also used to adjust the orbit of the space station.

The Progress spacecraft had a dry mass of 6,520 kilograms (14,370 lb), which increased to around 7,020 kilograms (15,480 lb) when fully fuelled. It measured 7.48 metres (24.5 ft) in length, and 2.72 metres (8 ft 11 in) in diameter. Each spacecraft could accommodate up to 2,500 kilograms (5,500 lb) of payload, consisting of dry cargo and propellant. The spacecraft were powered by chemical batteries, and could operate in free flight for up to three days, remaining docked to the station for up to thirty.

== Launch and docking ==
Progress 2 was launched at 11:26:16 UTC on 7 July 1978, atop a Soyuz-U 11A511U carrier rocket flying from Site 31/6 at the Baikonur Cosmodrome in the Kazakh Soviet Socialist Republic. The rocket that launched it had the serial number S15000-128. Following launch, Progress 2 was given the COSPAR designation 1978-070A, whilst NORAD assigned it the Satellite Catalog Number 10979.

Following launch, Progress 2 began two days of free flight. It subsequently docked with the aft port of the Salyut 6 space station at 12:58:59 UTC on 9 July. At the time of its docking, Soyuz 29 was docked to the forward port of the station. Soyuz 29 remained docked throughout the time Progress 2 was docked.

== Mission ==
Progress 2 was the second of twelve Progress spacecraft used to supply the Salyut 6 space station between 1978 and 1981. It delivered cargo to the station, including Kristall a kiln used for experiments aboard the outpost. Progress 2 also transferred 600 kilograms (1,300 lb) of propellant into Salyut 6's tanks. Whilst Progress 2 was docked, Salyut 6 was manned by the EO-2 crew, consisting of cosmonauts Vladimir Kovalyonok and Aleksandr Ivanchenkov.

On 29 July 1978, whilst docked to Salyut 6, Progress 2 was catalogued in a low Earth orbit with a perigee of 327 kilometres (203 mi) and an apogee of 330 kilometres (210 mi), inclined at 51.66° and with a period of 91.1 minutes. Progress 2 undocked from Salyut 6 at 04:57:44 UTC on 2 August. It remained in orbit until the early morning of 4 August 1978, when it was deorbited. The deorbit burn occurred at 01:31:07 UTC, with the spacecraft undergoing a destructive reentry at around 02:15 UTC. Less than four days after Progress 2 had been deorbited, Progress 3 was launched to replace it.

== See also ==
- 1978 in spaceflight
- List of Progress missions
- List of uncrewed spaceflights to Salyut space stations
