= Progress 3 =

Soviet unmanned Progress cargo spacecraft

- A Progress 7K-TG spacecraft
- Mission type: Salyut 6 resupply
- Operator: OKB-1
- COSPAR ID: 1978-077A
- SATCAT no.: 10999
- Mission duration: 16 days

Spacecraft properties
- Spacecraft: Progress s/n 103
- Spacecraft type: Progress 7K-TG
- Manufacturer: NPO Energia
- Launch mass: 7020 kg
- Dry mass: 6520 kg
- Payload mass: 2500 kg
- Dimensions: 7.48 m in length and 2.72 m in diameter

Start of mission
- Launch date: 7 August 1978, 22:31:22 UTC
- Rocket: Soyuz-U s/n Ye15000-138
- Launch site: Baikonur, Site 31/6
- Contractor: OKB-1

End of mission
- Disposal: Deorbited
- Decay date: 23 August 1978, 17:30 UTC

Orbital parameters
- Reference system: Geocentric
- Regime: Low Earth
- Perigee altitude: 195 km
- Apogee altitude: 249 km
- Inclination: 51.66°
- Period: 88.7 minutes
- Epoch: 7 August 1978

Docking with Salyut 6
- Docking port: Aft
- Docking date: 9 August 1978, 23:59:30 UTC
- Undocking date: 21 August 1978, 15:42:50 UTC
- Time docked: 15.18 days

Cargo
- Mass: 2500 kg

Progress 3 (Russian: Прогресс 3) was an unmanned Progress cargo spacecraft launched by the Soviet Union in 1978 to resupply the Salyut 6 space station. It used the Progress 7K-TG configuration, and was the third Progress mission to Salyut 6. It carried supplies for the EO-2 crew aboard Salyut 6, as well as equipment for conducting scientific research, and fuel for adjusting the station's orbit and performing manoeuvres.

== Spacecraft ==
Progress 3 was a Progress 7K-TG spacecraft. The third of forty three to be launched, it had the serial number 103. The Progress 7K-TG spacecraft was the first generation Progress, derived from the Soyuz 7K-T and intended for unmanned logistics missions to space stations in support of the Salyut programme. On some missions the spacecraft were also used to adjust the orbit of the space station.

The Progress spacecraft had a dry mass of 6,520 kilograms (14,370 lb), which increased to around 7,020 kilograms (15,480 lb) when fully fuelled. It measured 7.48 metres (24.5 ft) in length, and 2.72 metres (8 ft 11 in) in diameter. Each spacecraft could accommodate up to 2,500 kilograms (5,500 lb) of payload, consisting of dry cargo and propellant. The spacecraft were powered by chemical batteries, and could operate in free flight for up to three days, remaining docked to the station for up to thirty.

== Launch and docking ==
Progress 3 was launched at 22:31:22 UTC on 7 August 1978, atop a Soyuz-U 11A511U carrier rocket flying from Site 31/6 at the Baikonur Cosmodrome in the Kazakh Soviet Socialist Republic. The rocket that launched it had the serial number Ye15000-138. Following launch, Progress 3 was given the COSPAR designation 1978-077A, whilst NORAD assigned it the Satellite Catalog Number 10999.

Following launch, Progress 3 began two days of free flight. It subsequently docked with the aft port of the Salyut 6 space station at 23:59:30 UTC on 9 August 1978. At the time of its docking, Soyuz 29 was docked to the forward port of the station.

== Mission ==
Progress 3 was the third of twelve Progress spacecraft used to supply the Salyut 6 space station between 1978 and 1981. It delivered cargo to the station, including food, fur boots, and Kovalyonok's guitar. Whilst Progress 3 was docked, Salyut 6 was manned by the EO-2 crew, consisting of cosmonauts Vladimir Kovalyonok and Aleksandr Ivanchenkov.

On 9 August 1978, whilst docked to Salyut 6, Progress 3 was catalogued in a low Earth orbit with a perigee of 195 kilometres (121 mi) and an apogee of 249 kilometres (155 mi), inclined at 51.66° and with a period of 88.7 minutes. Progress 3 undocked from Salyut 6 at 15:42:50 UTC on 21 August 1978. It remained in orbit until the late afternoon of 23 August 1978, when it was deorbited. The deorbit burn occurred at 16:45:00 UTC, with the spacecraft undergoing a destructive reentry at around 17:30 UTC. Less than a few weeks after Progress 3 had been deorbited, Progress 4 was launched to replace it.

== See also ==
- 1978 in spaceflight
- List of Progress missions
- List of uncrewed spaceflights to Salyut space stations
