= Sigmund Jähn =

East German cosmonaut, 1st German in space (1937–2019)

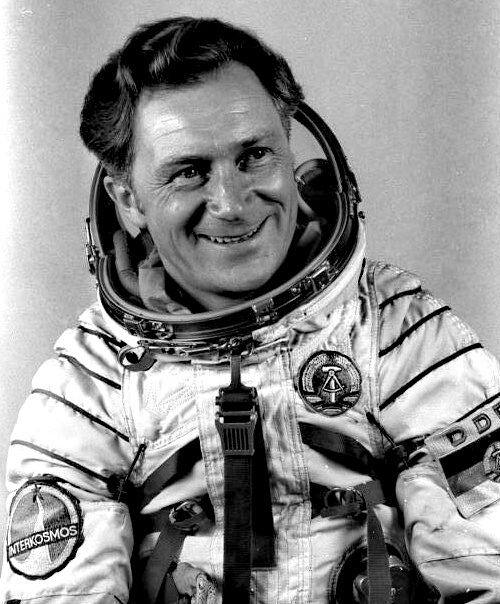
- Sigmund Jähn, 1978
- Born: Sigmund Werner Paul Jähn; 13 February 1937; Morgenröthe-Rautenkranz, Saxony, Third Reich
- Died: 21 September 2019 (aged 82); Strausberg, Brandenburg, Germany
- Occupation: Pilot
- Awards: Hero of the German Democratic Republic; Hero of the Soviet Union; Fliegerkosmonaut der Deutschen Demokratischen Republik
- Space career

Interkosmos Cosmonaut
- Rank: Generalmajor, Air Forces of the National People's Army
- Time in space: 7d 20h 49m
- Selection: 1976 Intercosmos Group
- Mission: Soyuz 31/Soyuz 29

Sigmund Werner Paul Jähn (German: [jɛ:n]; 13 February 1937 – 21 September 2019) was a German pilot, cosmonaut, and Generalmajor (equivalent to a Brigadier General in Western armies) in the National People's Army of the GDR. He was the first German to fly into space as part of the Soviet Union's Interkosmos program in 1978.

He was the very last living East German holder of the title Hero of the German Democratic Republic when he died in 2019.

== Early life ==
Jähn was born on 13 February 1937, in the town of Morgenröthe-Rautenkranz, located within the Vogtland region of Saxony, Nazi Germany. His father, Paul Jähn, was a sawmill worker, and his mother, Dora Jähn, was a housewife. Sigmund attended primary school from 1943 to 1951 and then trained in an apprenticeship program as a book printer from 1951 to 1954. Shortly after the apprenticeship, he worked as a Pioneer Leader at the Hammerbrücke Central School. Jähn (via his father's stories and memorabilia) and his father were impressed by the early rocketry pioneers of the 1920s around Fritz von Opel and the first manned rockets on land and in the air, igniting his enthusiasm for aviation, rocketry and spaceflight.

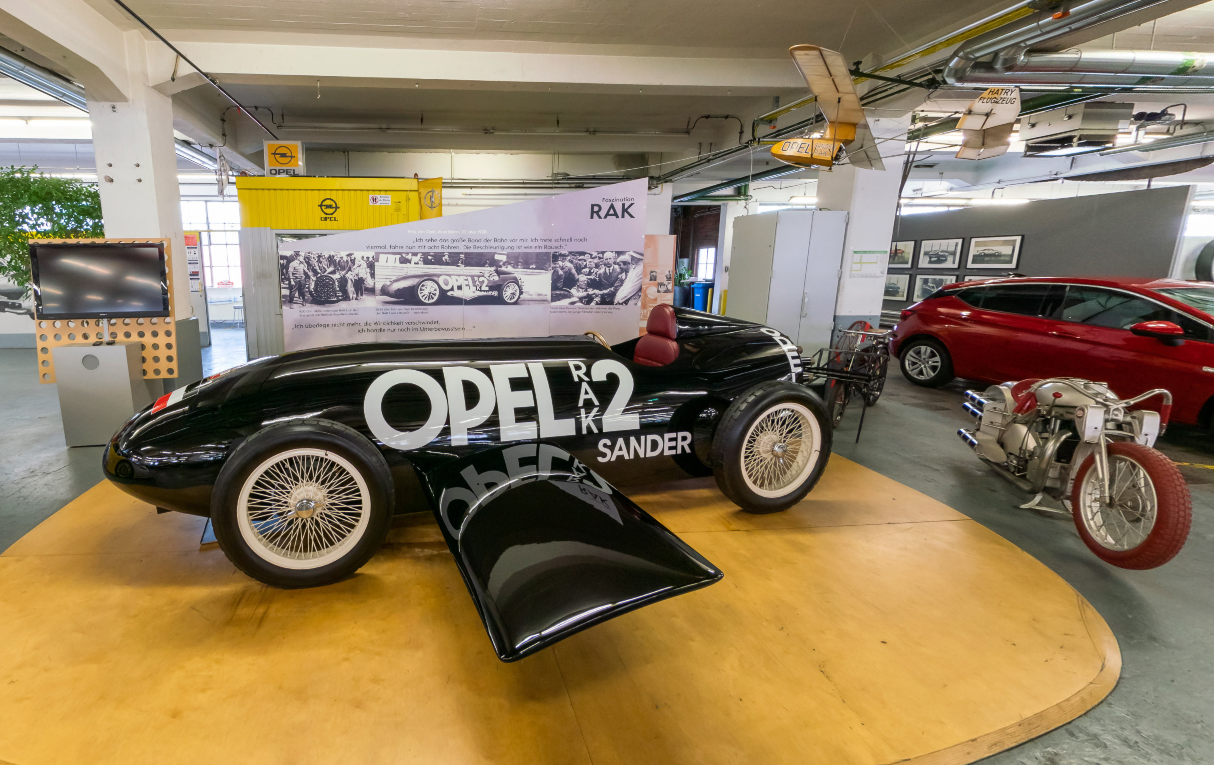
Replica of Opel RAK rocket cars, bikes, and aircraft, originally demonstrated in the 1920s

On 26 April 1955, Jähn enlisted into the predecessor of the East German Army in the town of Preschen and eventually worked his way into the East German Air Force. He finished basic training in 1956, enrolling at the officer's school in Kamenz, and was sent to flight school in the town of Bautzen, which would later become its own officer's school for military pilots. Jähn returned to his squadron, the Jagdfliegergeschwader 8, or Fighter Aviation Squad 8, two years later and remained there until 1960, when he and his team were relocated one last time to Marxwalde. During his flight career, he saved himself from crashing by ejecting from the MiG-17 he was piloting. He worked as the Deputy Commander for Political Affairs in his squadron from 1961 to 1963, then headed the Air Tactics/Air Combat division until 1965. At the same time, Jähn passed his Abitur and was sent to the J.A. Gagarin Air Force Academy in Monino, just outside of Moscow, Russia. Between 1970 and 1976, he was an inspector for fighter-pilot training and flight safety under the Deputy Head of the LSK/LV for Air Force Training of the Kommando LSK/LV.

Jähn achieved the rank of Lieutenant Colonel and was selected for the Soviet Union's Interkosmos cosmonaut training program in November 1976, alongside three other candidates (Eberhard Köllner, Rolf Berger, and Eberhard Golbs). Jähn and Köllner were selected out of the three candidates to be included in the first Interkosmos group. In addition to Jähn's previous flying experience and expertise with the Russian language, he was selected for his early entry into the SED program and his success coming from a blue-collar background.

== Space career ==
=== Training ===
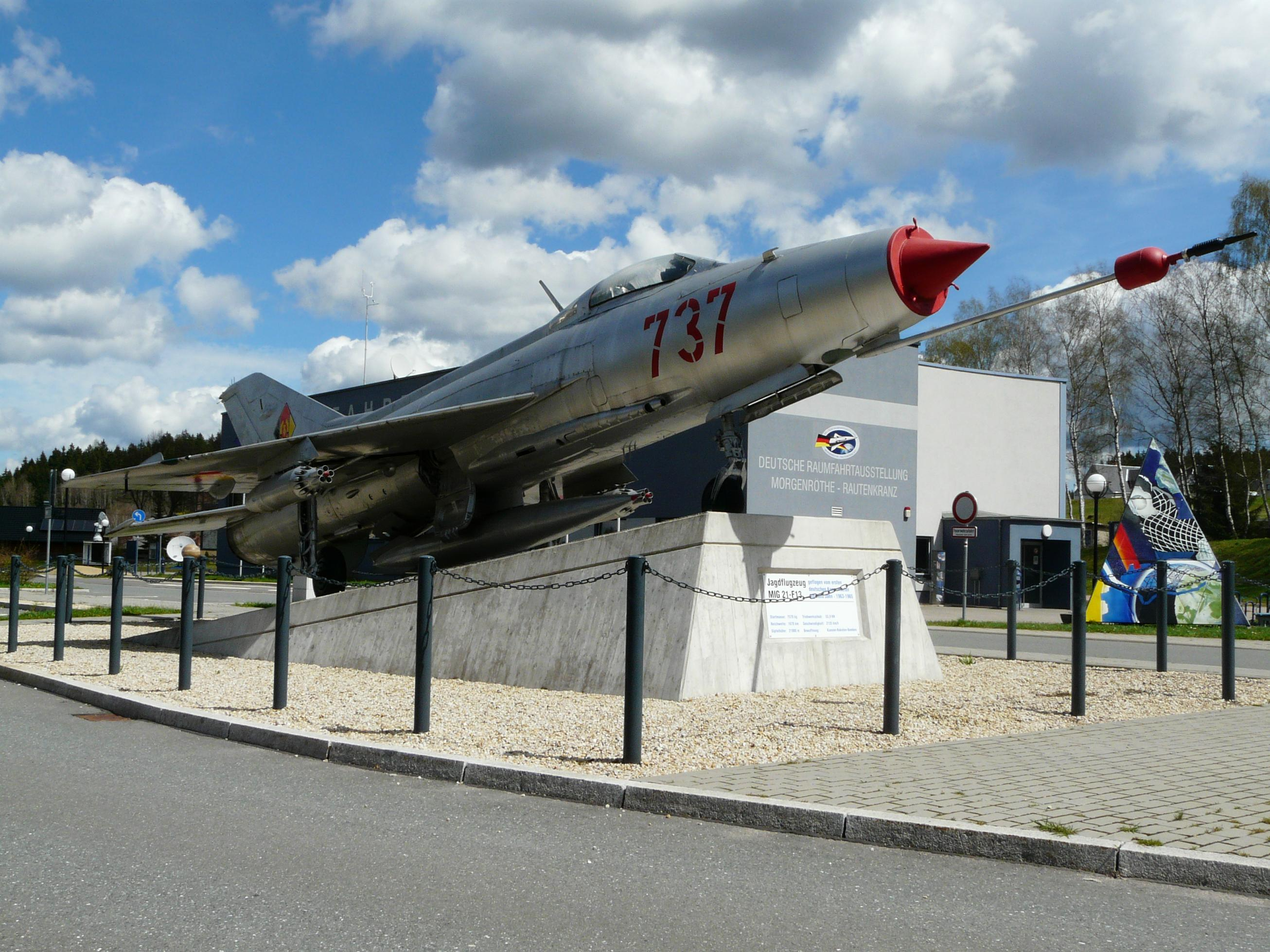
MiG-21 fighter plane, which was also flown by Jähn, in front of the German Space Travel Exhibition in Morgenröthe-Rautenkranz (2015)

Jähn and Köllner began training together in 1976, with Köllner serving as his backup pilot. The two candidates spent the next two years conducting mission-specific training and their physical health was closely monitored by physicians at the NVA's Institute for Aviation Medicine in preparation for their upcoming flight.

=== Soyuz 31 mission ===
On 26 August 1978, Jähn and his co-pilot, Valery Bykovsky flew aboard the Soyuz 31 to the Soviet space station Salyut 6. The two men were greeted by resident cosmonauts Vladimir Kovalyonok and Aleksandr Ivanchenkov who arrived during the Soyuz 29 mission. Jähn's flight lasted 7 days, 20 hours, 49 minutes, and 4 seconds - orbiting Earth 124 times. During the mission, he conducted numerous scientific experiments. These included technical experiments with the MKF-6 multispectral camera for remote sensing of the Earth's surface, material science experiments on crystallization, like the formation, recrystallization, and the cultivation of a monocrystal. He also conducted medical experiments on how weightlessness affects speech, occupational psychological studies, testing the hearing sensitivity of regular crew members, biological experiments on cellular growth under weightlessness, and the connection between microorganisms with organic polymers and inorganic substances.

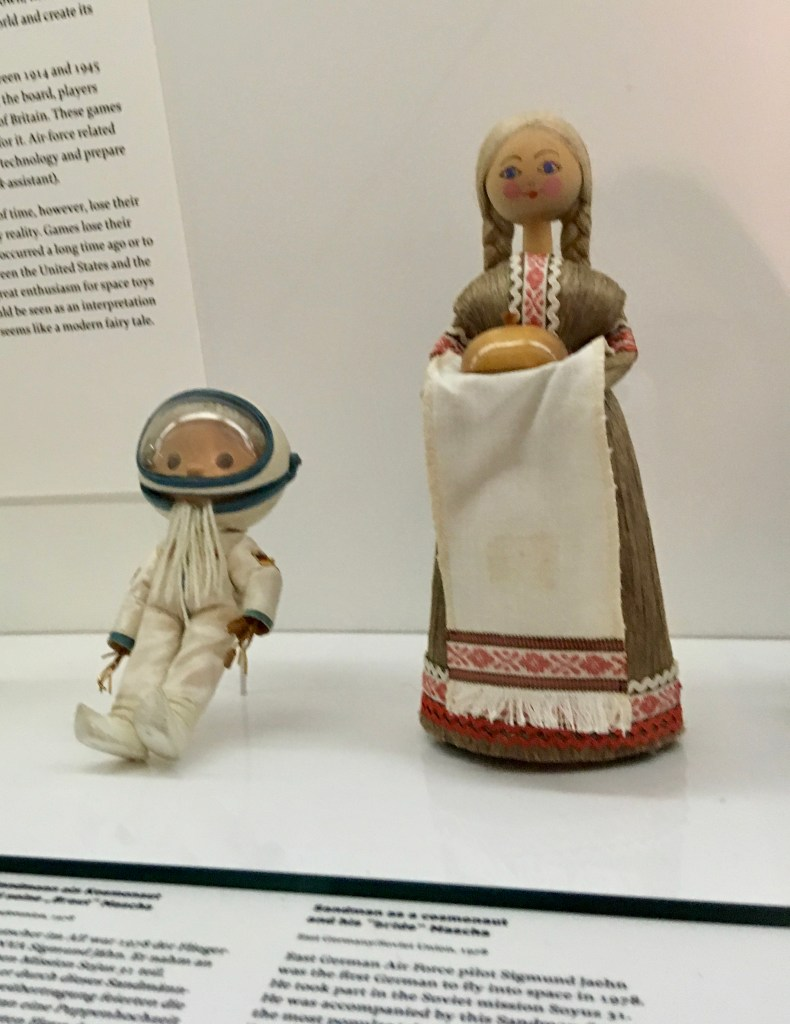
The Sandmännchen and his wife Masha in the permanent exhibition of the Bundeswehr Military History Museum in Dresden.

Among the advanced scientific equipment on board, the two cosmonauts carried mementos from home. Jähn brought a figurine of Sandmännchen, a beloved East German children's television character, and Bykovsky the straw-braided doll Masha in Belarusian garbs. They improvised a "cosmic wedding" which was live broadcast in Jähn's greeting to the East German children in Sandmännchen's evening show. The original bride and groom figures found their retirement residence in the Bundeswehr Military History Museum in Dresden.

The Soyuz 31 remained docked to the Salyut 6 station until the custom-made seats were transferred between both Soyuz craft, where it was then used as a return vessel for Kovalyonok and Ivanchenkov. Jähn and Bykovsky later returned in the Soyuz 29 craft.

Jähn received permanent injuries to his spinal cord after an unexpectedly rough landing. Just a few yards from the ground, a gust of wind thrust the capsule back into the air, causing it hit the ground with increased momentum. Jähn couldn't reach the capsule's parachute-release switch in time and was consequently dragged across the steppes where it landed, rolling over itself several times before coming to a stop.

Jähn's national space patch from the air force of the National People's Army

=== Media reception ===
The report on the space flight was prepared like a general staffing brief: on the morning of 26 August 1978, the editors in chief of the GDR radio stations and newspapers all received three sealed and numbered letters. Each one contained a different announcement depending on the outcome of the flight, whether it was successful, resulted in a fatal accident, or an emergency landing in enemy territory. The corresponding letter was only to be opened and published following a telephone call with specific instructions. After the mission was a success, the letters with the negative outcomes were then collected from the organizations.

Jähn's space flight was celebrated and covered extensively by GDR media outlets, since one of the smaller German states was home to the first German in space. On Sunday, 27 August 1978, Neues Deutschland published a special edition newspaper with the headline "The First German in Space - A Citizen of the GDR". Specifically using the word "German" in reference to a citizen of Germany was not usually used in the GDR media. Aktuelle Kamera broadcast several special programs about the mission.

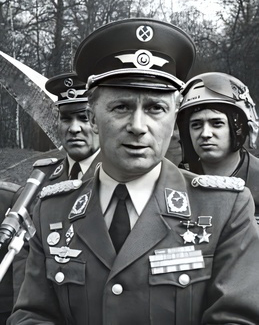
Sigmund Jähn with the Hero of the GDR and Hero of the Soviet Union medals, April 1981

Jähn was awarded the Hero of the GDR and the Hero of the Soviet Union medals in April 1981, and a bust of the cosmonaut was unveiled in the Hain der Kosmonauten (trans. Hall of Cosmonauts) in front of the Archenhold Observatory in East Berlin. It was removed in 1990, though was later replaced with a new version in the Saxony State Statistical Office on 22 February 2008. Some schools, recreational centers, street names, and the cargo ship Neptun 421 were named in honor of Jähn throughout his lifetime. The observatory in Rodewisch, Germany, where Sputnik 1 was first observed from Earth, was also renamed after Jähn in 1979.

An exhibition dedicated to space flight and aeronautics was constructed in the former train station of his home town Morgenröthe-Rautenkranz. This exhibit received multiple additions between 1991 and 1992, and the name was formally changed to The German Space Exhibition. Since 2007, the expanded sections have been housed in a newer building not far from the original location. Furthermore, a 4.5m (~14.8 ft.) memorial was erected in the same town to commemorate the first German cosmonaut in space.

In the 2003 German film Good Bye, Lenin!, Jähn is the boyhood hero of the film's protagonist, Alex Kerner. As part of an effort to prevent his mother from learning that the Berlin Wall came down while she was in a coma and that East Germany no longer exists as a separate nation, Kerner locates a taxi driver (played by Swiss actor Stefan Walz), who resembles the cosmonaut, to appear in a fake newscast as the successor of Communist Party Secretary Erich Honecker. "Comrade Jähn" gives a speech proclaiming that he will open the East German borders to welcome West German refugees.

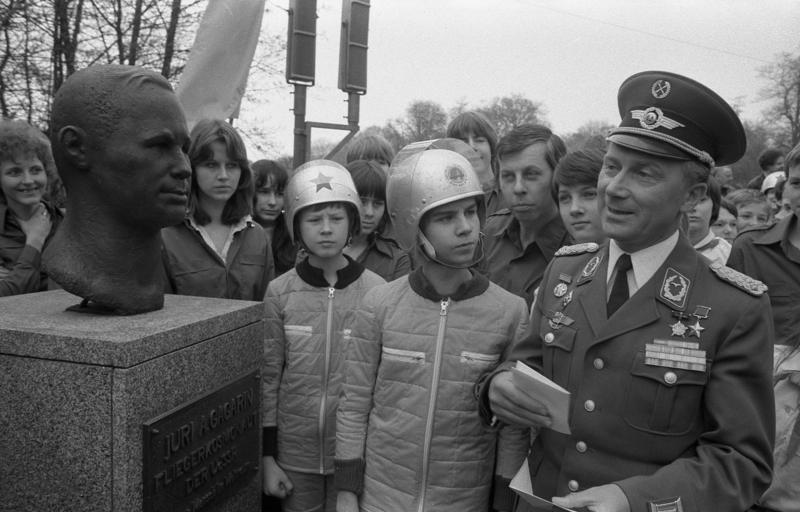
Sigmund Jähn in front of the bust of Yuri Gagarin in the Hain der Kosmonauten at the Archenhold Observatory, 1981

The German public broadcaster Mitteldeutscher Rundfunk organized a themed event for his 80th birthday. It aired as part of a special television program "Sigmund Jähn and the Heroes of the Stars" on the nights of 12 and 13 February 2017.

In an interview with Der Spiegel 30 years after his space flight, Jähn commented: "But the celebratory reports weren't music to my ears; I didn't want to be made into a folk hero ... I found the spotlight more strenuous than traveling in space."

Die Zeit wrote in 2018: "To this day, many West Germans do not know the first German in space ... Conversely, all former GDR citizens know who Sigmund Jähn is."

== Later career ==
Jähn was promoted to colonel in 1978 following the success of the Soyuz 31 space flight and was subsequently promoted to Deputy Head of the Center for Cosmic Training within the Kommando LSK/LV. He remained deputy head of the training center until 1990.

In 1983, Jähn received his doctorate of science in remote sensing of the Earth at the Zentralinstitut für Physik der Erde in Potsdam. He studied under the leadership of Karl-Heinz Marek, the department head for remote sensing at that time. Jähn's doctoral thesis, among other topics, was based on the scientific preparations and evaluations of various kinds of flight missions.

Jähn became one of the founding members of the Association of Space Explorers in 1985.

On 1 March 1986, Jähn was promoted to major general. Following the dissolution of the GDR on 2 October 1990, he was relieved from duty alongside the last remaining command staff of the NVA, like Major General Lothar Engelhardt and Admiral Theodor Hoffmann.

Jähn became a freelance consultant for the German Aerospace Center until 1993. He then worked for the European Space Agency, or ESA following their ongoing projects with the Russian space agency Roscosmos in Zvyozdny Gorodok. He obtained this position with the support of his West German colleague Ulf Merbold and remained there for the following 15 years. The two had met in 1984 during a conference held in Salzburg.

He retired in 2002. In 2011, on the 50th anniversary of the first human space flight by Yuri Gagarin, he explained to Der Spiegel that taking the Das Sandmännchen toy on his flight was not a personal choice, but rather he took the figurine in order to film material for the show.

== Private life ==
Jähn lived in Strausberg with his wife, Erika Hänsel, and two daughters, Marina and Grit. He and his wife lived there until his passing on 21 September 2019, and was buried in the St. Mary's Protestant Cemetery in Strausberg.

When Jähn returned from his space flight, he was greeted by his family with a picture of his grandson. This was ultimately concealed by GDR news stations because his role as a grandfather would not have conformed to the desired image the space agency wanted to promote: one of youth and virility.

== Commendations ==
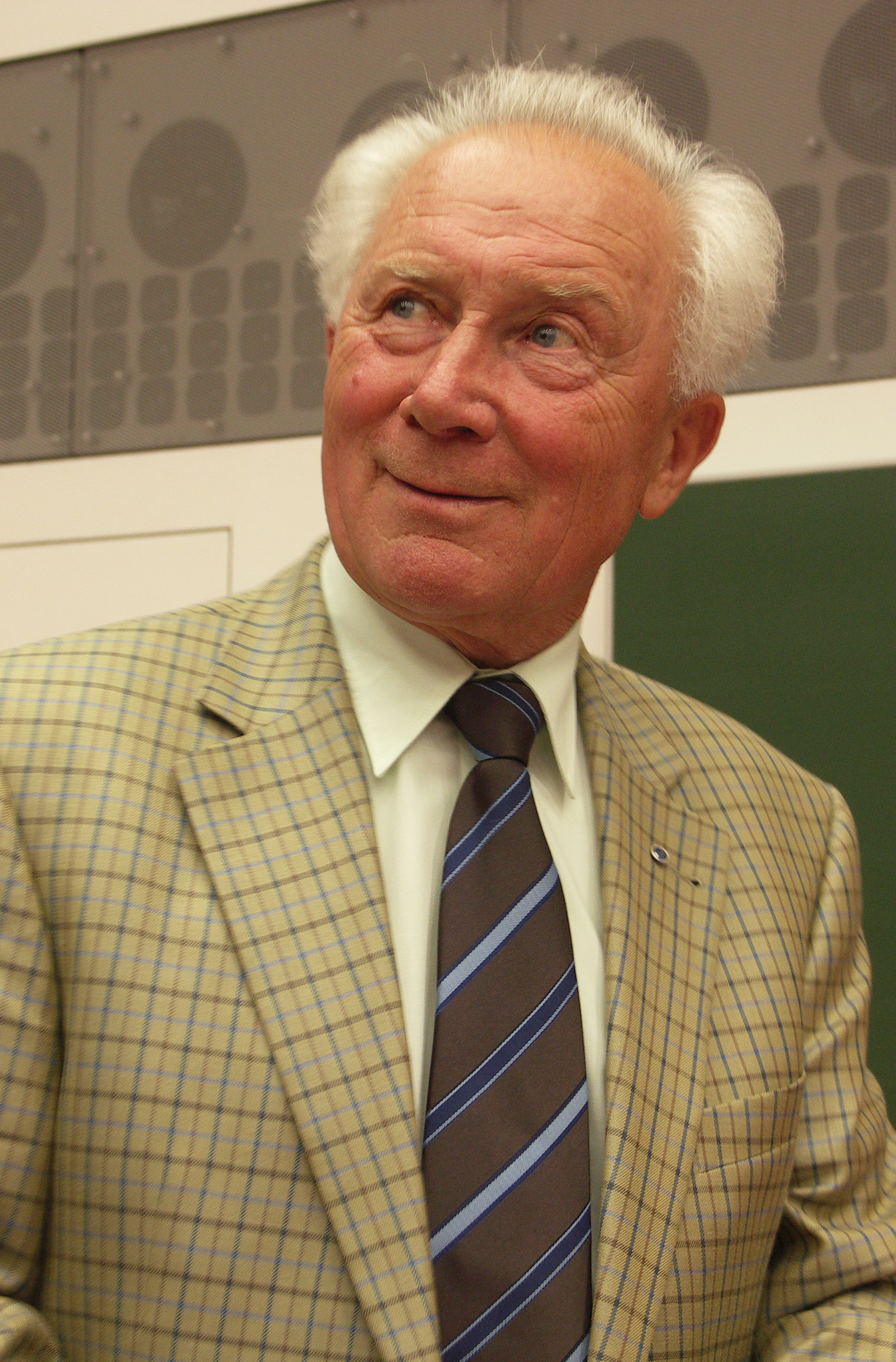
Jähn in 2009

- 1977: Meritorious Military Pilot of the German Democratic Republic
- 1978: Hero of the Soviet Union
- 1978: Hero of the GDR
- 1978: Order of Karl Marx (according to award regulations, Hero of the GDR)
- 1978: Leibniz Medal from the Academy of Sciences of the GDR
- Sigmund Jähn was the only recipient of the honorary title of Fliegerkosmonaut der Deutschen Demokratischen Republik
- The space flight planetarium on Peißnitzinsel in Halle (Saale), opened 1978, was named after him. After the building was demolished due to flood damage, the name Planetarium Halle (Saale) was chosen for the site built in 2021.
- 1978: Honorary citizen of East Berlin. The picture of the cosmonauts Jähn and Bykowski hangs in the Gallery of Honor of the Berlin House of Representatives.
- The Deutsche Seereederei Rostock named its second cargo ship the Fliegerkosmonaut der DDR Sigmund Jähn and was put into service on March 30, 1979; the ship was part of the series "Freighter 'Cam Doussié' (Type Neptun, 4th modification)", NEPTUN-421 (DSR).
  - This was not only the longest DSR ship name of all time, but also the longest in the world at the time, which is said to have even been included in the Guinness Book of Records. Sigmund Jähn was embarrassed by this.
- September 25, 1979: Elementary school in Fürstenwalde/Spree named after Sigmund Jähn.
- In 1979, the cosmonaut center in the Küchwald recreational area in Karl-Marx-Stadt (now Chemnitz) was given the honorary name “Sigmund Jähn”, which still remains today.
- 1979: The observatory Sternwarte und Planetarium in Rodewisch are named after Jähn.
- In 1982, the GST flight school in Jahnsdorf was given the honorary name of the GST Fliegerkosmonaut Sigmund Jähn flight school and a monument was constructed.
- On October 5, 1982: Honorary citizen of his home town of Strausberg near Berlin.
- 1998: Dr. Friedrich Joseph Haass-Preis of the German-Russian Forum.
- 1999: Golden Hen Media Prize. The pop group Die Prinzen released their song “Wer ist Sigmund Jähn?” (Who is Sigmund Jähn?) that year on their album "So viel Spaß für wenig Geld".
- In 2001, the asteroid 1998 BF14, discovered on January 27, 1998, at the Drebach public observatory in the Ore Mountains, was named after Jähn and is designated (17737) Sigmundjähn.
- 2002: Honorary citizen of Morgenröthe-Rautenkranz.
- January 20, 2007: Honorary citizen of Neuhardenberg. A memorial plaque was unveiled there in Jähn's former home (in Marxwalde).
- 2011: Honorary member of the Leibniz Society of Sciences in Berlin.
- May 3, 2012: (for the second time) honorary citizen of his home town of Strausberg.
- The German astronaut Alexander Gerst took a badge with pictures of Bykowski and Jähn on his first flight to the ISS in 2014 and sent Jähn a photo of it.
- On September 29, 2017, a primary school in Dommitzsch, Saxony, was named after the cosmonaut.
- Since January 1, 2020, the former "Bahnhofstrasse" street in Morgenröthe-Rautenkranz has been called "Dr.-Sigmund-Jähn-Strasse".

== Publications ==
- Erlebnis Weltraum. Military Publishing House of the GDR, Berlin 1983, ISBN 3-327-00710-1, 3rd unchanged edition, Berlin 1985.
- Fickers, Andreas, Frieß, Peter, ed. (1993). Ulf Merbold und Sigmund Jähn sprechen über die Entwicklung der Raumfahrt in beiden Teilen Deutschlands während des Kalten Kriegs und nach der Vereinigung [Ulf Merbold and Sigmund Jähn Talk About the Development of Space Travel in Both Parts of Germany During the Cold War and After Reunification]. TechnikDialog (in German). Bonn: Deutsches Museum. OCLC 907718673.

== Literature ==
- Jähn, Sigmund (1985). Erlebnis Weltraum (in German). East Berlin: Militärverlag der DDR.
- Hoffmann, Horst. Sigmund Jähn. Der fliegende Vogtländer (in German). Berlin: Das Neue Berlin. 1999. ISBN 3-360-00848-0. (biography).
- Hoffmann, Horst. Hoffmann, Horst (1998). Die Deutschen im Weltraum. Zur Geschichte der Kosmosforschung und Raumfahrt in der DDR Vorwort von Sigmund Jähn (in German) (Ost ed.). Edition Ost. ISBN 3-932180-49-6..
- Hoffmann, Horst. Sigmund Jähn. Rückblick ins All: Die Biografie des ersten deutschen Kosmonauten (in German). Berlin: Das Neue Berlin. 2008. ISBN 978-3-360-01947-9.
