= Soyuz 29 =

1978 Soviet crewed spaceflight to Salyut 6

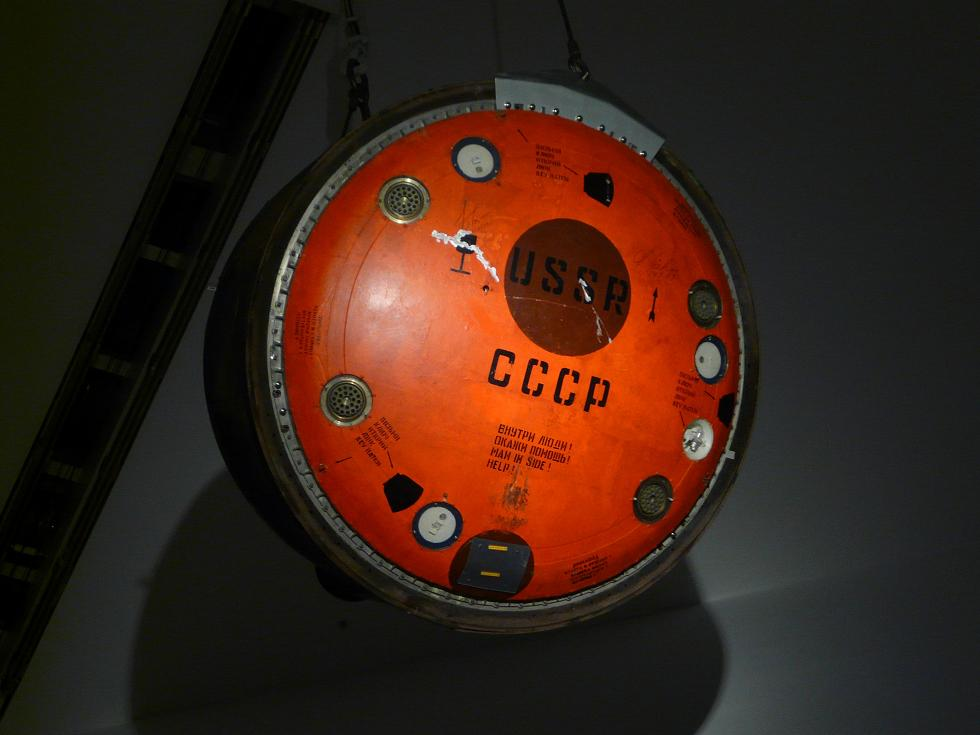
- The return capsule of Soyuz 29 on display at the Militärhistorisches Museum in Dresden, Germany
- Operator: Soviet space program
- COSPAR ID: 1978-061A
- SATCAT no.: 10952
- Mission duration: Capsule: 79 days, 15 hours and 23 minutes Original crew: 139 days, 14 hours and 47 minutes

Spacecraft properties
- Spacecraft type: Soyuz 7K-T
- Manufacturer: NPO Energia
- Launch mass: 6,800 kg (15,000 lb)

Crew
- Crew size: 2
- Launching: Vladimir Kovalyonok; Aleksandr Ivanchenkov
- Landing: Valery Bykovsky; Sigmund Jähn
- Callsign: Фотон (Foton – "Photon")

Start of mission
- Launch date: 15 June 1978, 20:16:45 UTC
- Rocket: Soyuz-U
- Launch site: Baikonur 1/5

End of mission
- Landing date: 3 September 1978, 11:40:34 UTC
- Landing site: 46.7°N 68.7°E

Orbital parameters
- Reference system: Geocentric
- Regime: Low Earth
- Perigee altitude: 197.8 km (122.9 mi)
- Apogee altitude: 266 km (165 mi)
- Inclination: 51.65 degrees
- Period: 88.86 minutes

Docking with Salyut 6
- Docking port: Front
- Docking date: 16 June 1978, 21:58:14 UTC
- Undocking date: 3 September 1978, 08:23 UTC
- Time docked: 78 days, 10 hours and 24 minutes
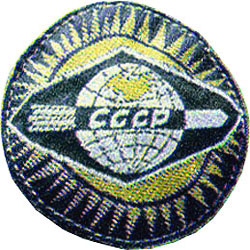
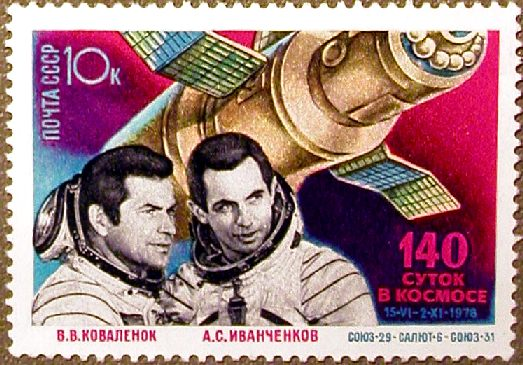
- Soviet stamp featuring Kovalyonok and Ivanchenkov (1978) Soyuz programme

Soyuz 29 (Russian: Союз 29, Union 29) was a 1978 crewed Soviet space mission to the Salyut 6 space station. It was the fifth mission, the fourth successful docking, and the second long-duration crew for the orbiting station. Commander Vladimir Kovalyonok and flight engineer Aleksandr Ivanchenkov established a new space-endurance record of 139 days.

The crew returned in Soyuz 31, which had been swapped by a crew launched in August who returned in Soyuz 29.

== Crew ==
Prime crew
Position	Launching cosmonaut	Landing cosmonaut
Commander	Vladimir Kovalyonok; EO-2; Second spaceflight	Valery Bykovsky; EP-4; Third and last spaceflight
Flight engineer/research cosmonaut	Aleksandr Ivanchenkov; EO-2; First spaceflight	Sigmund Jähn, Interkosmos; EP-4; First spaceflight

Backup crew
Position	Launching cosmonaut	Landing cosmonaut
Commander	Vladimir Lyakhov	Viktor Gorbatko
Flight engineer/research cosmonaut	Valery Ryumin	Eberhard Köllner, Interkosmos

== Mission highlights ==
=== Launch and station re-activation ===
The second long-duration mission to Salyut 6 was launched into orbit on 15 June 1978. The space station had been vacant for three months since the record-breaking mission of Soyuz 26 ended after 96 days. The crew successfully docked on 17 June and Kovalyonok and Ivanchenkov reactivated the station. Kovalyonok, who was aboard the failed Soyuz 25 mission to Salyut 6, became the first person to visit the same station twice.

They switched on the station's air regenerators and thermal regulation system, and activated the water recycling system to reprocess water left aboard by Soyuz 26. De-mothballing Salyut 6 occurred simultaneously with the crew's adaptation to weightlessness, and required about one week. On 19 June, Salyut 6 was in a 368-by-338-kilometer (229 by 210 mi) orbit. Onboard temperature was 20 °C (68 °F), and air pressure was 750 mmHg (100 kPa; 14.5 psi). Soon after this, Kovalyonok and Ivanchenkov performed maintenance on the station's airlock, installed equipment they brought with them in Soyuz 29's orbital module, and tested the station's Kaskad orientation system.

The station operated in gravity-gradient stabilized mode between 24 and 26 June to avoid attitude control system engine firings which could cause interference with a 3-day smelting experiment using the Splav-01 furnace. The previous crew installed the furnace in the intermediate compartment so it could operate in vacuum. At the time, the station was in an orbit exposed to sunlight for an entire day. This happened twice a year when the plane of the station's orbit faced the sun.

=== Soyuz 30 crew visits, Progress 2 docks ===
Soyuz 30, with Pyotr Klimuk and the second Intercosmos participant, Mirosław Hermaszewski of Poland, arrived at Salyut 6 on 29 June. For the third time, the Salyut was a four-man orbiting space laboratory. The activities of the Soyuz 30 crew, however, were severely curtailed so as not to interfere with the Soyuz 29 crew. They returned to Earth in the capsule they came in on 5 July.

Progress 2, the second uncrewed supply tanker to dock with a crewed space station, arrived at Salyut 6 on 9 July. Fifty days of supplies were on board, including 200 litres of water, 250 kg (551 lb) of food, the Kristall furnace, 600 kg (1,323 lb) of propellant, air re-generators, computer sub-systems, replacement parts, film and mail. It took the crew a week to unload the vehicle. On 19 July, the tanker refueled the station, then it was filled with used equipment and trash and sent into a destructive de-orbit on 4 August.

The crew was advised not to use the station treadmill at certain speeds, as dangerous vibrations could be produced. This advice was a result of resonance experiments carried out by the previous long-term Soyuz 26 crew.

Experiments continued, with glass and semi-conductor tests done with the Kristall furnace, newly installed in the transfer tunnel leading to the rear docking port. Mercury telluride and cadmium telluride were processed on 18 July, and 24 July saw aluminum, tin and molybdenum alloys processed in the Spalv furnace.

The crew complained of headaches before realizing the carbon dioxide detectors had failed to alert them to change the air purifiers. Normal CO_{2} levels were 8.8 mm Hg; the levels had likely reached 62 mm Hg to cause the headaches.

=== Spacewalk, Progress 3 ===
The crew performed a spacewalk on 29 July, the second from Salyut 6. Their main mission was to retrieve material from the Medusa experiment, left on the station's exterior by the Soyuz 26 crew in December. The experiment was designed to test various materials' exposure to space. Aluminum, titanium, steel, rubber and glass were among the materials tested. Later examination revealed two hundred small craters caused by orbital debris, much more than anticipated. Much of the debris was said to be paint chips and propellant residue.

During the two-hour EVA, the crew saw a meteor pass below them, an event which briefly blinded them. Air lost during the EVA was replaced by air from the Progress 2 spacecraft.

Progress 3 was launched on 8 August and docked with Salyut 6 two days later. With it, the station's orbit was boosted to 244 x 262 km (163 mi). Supplies aboard the tanker included strawberries, onions, milk, 450 kg (992 lb) of air, 190 litres of water, fur boots, newspapers, film, letters and equipment. Additionally, Ivanchenkov's guitar was on board. It was the first tanker not to carry a fresh supply of propellant for the station, as Progress 2 had so recently replenished Salyut 6's tanks. The Progress was de-orbited on 23 August.

The station was put into gravity gradient stabilized flight on 11 August for materials processing with the Kristall and Splav furnaces, and the crew underwent medical experiments on 16 August.

=== Soyuz 31 crew visits, first Soyuz redock ===
Soyuz 29's second visiting crew was launched on 26 August on Soyuz 31 with Valery Bykovsky and East German Sigmund Jähn, the third Intercosmos participant, aboard. Food was brought aboard, and numerous medical and biological experiments were carried out. The visiting crew swapped craft with the resident crew, and tested Soyuz 29's engines on 2 September. Seat liners were exchanged the next day, the craft undocked, and Bykovsky and Jähn returned to Earth.

On 7 September, after the Soyuz 31 crew had left, the Soyuz 29 crew entered the Soyuz 31 craft and undocked from the Salyut 6 station. Salyut 6 was commanded to rotate 180 degrees, and Soyuz 31 redocked at its forward port. It was the first time the Soviets had attempted such a redocking. The redock had the effect of clearing the aft port for another Progress craft.

Experiments continued on the station, and on 15 September, the cosmonauts took their second showers. By October, some 3,000 photographs had been taken and some 50 experiments carried out.

The crew marked a significant milestone on 20 September when they surpassed the 96-day space endurance record of the Soyuz 26 crew, set earlier that year.

=== Progress 4, propulsion system troubles, and return to Earth ===
The third Progress tanker for the crew arrived at Salyut 6's aft port on 6 October. Progress 4 had 1,300 kg (2,900 lb) of equipment aboard, including air canisters, clothes, magazines and food. Ivanchenkov's wife had smuggled some brandy-filled chocolates into a box of candy, and when the crew opened the box, the chocolates flew out. It took them two hours to retrieve the candies.

Refueling was completed on 13 October, two burns were used to raise the station's orbit on 20 October, and the Progress was de-orbited on 26 October.

Towards the end of the mission, the cosmonauts noticed abnormal behavior with the station's engines and reported it to ground controllers.

More experiments were carried out in the waning days of the mission. A lunar eclipse was observed on 7 October, extensive medical tests were carried out between 17 and 18 October, and more material experiments were conducted in the Kristall and Splav furnaces on 22 October.

The crew exercised three hours a day during their final month in orbit. Experiments were transferred to Soyuz 31 on 30 October, its engines were tested, and the station's interior was cleaned. They returned to Earth on 2 November, landing 180 km (110 mi) southeast of Jezkazgan. The landing was covered live by Soviet television. The crew mostly recovered in five days, and fully recovered 25 days after their return. They were the first crew to have difficulty talking after returning to Earth. Despite all this, their condition was slightly better than the previous long-duration crew's. They had spent a total of 139 days in orbit.

After the residency was finished and Salyut 6 went back into uncrewed mothball mode for the next several months, ground crews studied telemetry data from the station to figure out what was wrong with the propulsion system. They concluded that a leak in one of the UDMH tanks had contaminated the nitrogen-pressurized bellows that fed propellant into the engines. Further use of the main engines could aggravate the leak and possibly ruin the entire propulsion system, including the attitude control thrusters. As a result of this development, it was decided to not risk firing the main engines again for the remainder of the station's operating life. With Salyut 6 limited to its attitude control thrusters, all orbital maneuvers from now on had to be carried out by visiting spacecraft.

The relatively good shape the crew were in was seen as a direct result of the hard exercise program carried out in the final days of the mission, and cleared the way for even longer flights.

== Mission parameters ==
- Mass: 6,800 kg (15,000 lb)
- Perigee: 197.8 km (122.9 mi)
- Apogee: 266 km (165 mi)
- Inclination: 51.65°
- Period: 88.86 minutes
