= Meritorious Military Pilot of the German Democratic Republic =

Meritorious Military Pilot of the GDR Verdienter Militärflieger der DDR
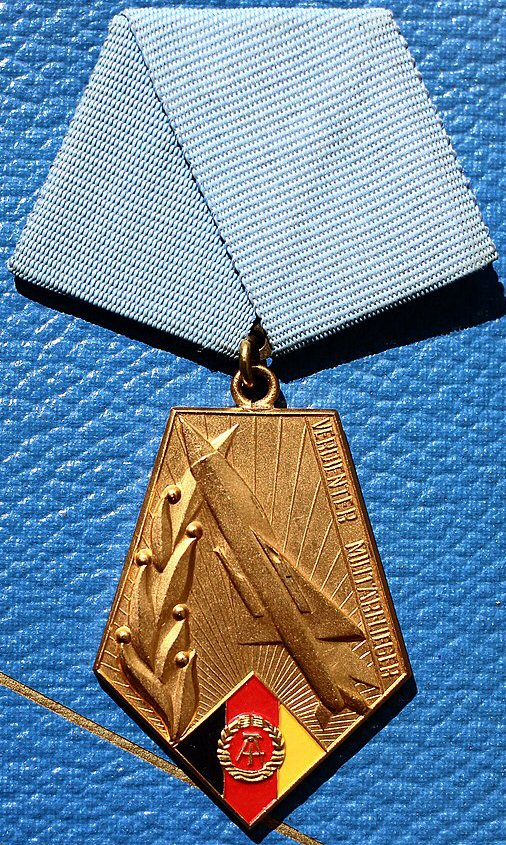
- Obverse
- Type: One class honorary title
- Awarded for: Distinguished performance of military pilot
- Country: East Germany
- Presented by: NPA
- Eligibility: Military pilots of the German Democratic Republic
- Status: No longer awarded
- Established: August 1, 1974
- First award: 1974
- Final award: 1990

Highlights
- Total: 137+
- Total recipients: see table below
- Ribbon bar

Precedence
- Next (higher): Order for Merit for the Nation and Fatherland
- Equivalent: Honorary title "Meritorious Member of the National People’s Army"
- Next (lower): Distinguished Service Medal of the NPA

Meritorious Military Pilot of the GDR (German: Verdienter Militärflieger der DDR) was the highest honorary title awarded to military pilots of the East German National People's Army. It was given in the form of a medal. Established on August 1, 1974, by the Council of Ministers of the GDR, it was awarded until the dissolution of the GDR in 1990.

== Award criteria ==
The honorary title could be awarded for:

- Distinguished performance of military pilot compared with:
  - Outstanding results in the political and military adjunction as well as
  - Outstanding results as to the development of the NPA combat readiness
- Military pilot's performance level: Class I
- No aviation accidents or incidents

The number of awarded people was limited to 10 military pilots per year.

== Medal description ==
The medal is gold-colored, has the shape of an irregular vertically symmetrical pentagon standing on its tip, and is 31.5 mm wide by 41.5 mm tall. On the lower tip is a colorfully-enameled aircraft roundel of the National People's Army.

The biggest part of the medal is occupied by a MiG-21 taking off steeply, behind which are sunrays emanating from the roundel. Left of the aircraft is a laurel bough, and right of it is the oblique wording VERDIENTER MILITÄRFLIEGER.

The reverse side of the medal is empty and glossy.

Different versions have been issued:

- 1974–1976: Medal from nonferrous metal gold colored, varnished, size with arched eye 40.5 × 30 mm, reverse glossy. Medal on small medal bar 14 × 25 mm.
- 1976–1989: ditto varnished, medal with round eye, on pentagon bar with gibbon bar 14 × 25 mm, reverse glossy, ditto brass-plated, with reverse ornamented.

== Wear ==
The medal was worn on the left breast suspended from a sky blue ribbon of 25 × 14 mm size in the pentagonal shape that was standard in the Soviet armed forces and thus also used by East Germany. The ribbon bar was the same color as the medal ribbon, and also featured a miniature, all gold colored version of the NPA roundel.

== Recipients (complete list) ==
The individuals below were recipients of the honorary title of "Honoured Military Pilot of the GDR".

| Year | Service rank | Name, first name | Service position |
|---|---|---|---|
| 1974 | Oberst | Baarß, Klaus-Jürgen | Dep./A3 Fighter Aviation of the Air Defence, Kdo. LSK/LV |
| 1974 | Colonel | Spitzenberg, K-Heinz | Commander (Cdr) Jagdfliegergeschwader 2 (JG-2) |
| 1974 | LtCol | Adler, Gottfried | DepCdr/Kampfhubschraubergeschwader 34 (KHG-34) |
| 1974 | LtCol | Hamilton, Richard | Cdr 2nd Fighter Training Squadrin (FTSqn)/Flieger Ausbildungsgeschwader 25 (FAG-25) |
| 1974 | LtCol | Otto, Hans-Peter | Cdr Jagdfliegergeschwader 3 (JG-3) |
| 1974 | LtCol | Wingelsdorf, Horst | Head Air tactics/Air firing Jagdfliegergeschwader 1 (JG-1) |
| 1974 | LtCol | Wolf, Eberhard | DepCdr Fighter Squadron (FSqn)/Jagdfliegergeschwader 8 (JG-8) |
| 1974 | Major | Grünberg, Horst | DepCdr FSqn/Jagdfliegergeschwader 9 (JG-9) |
| 1975 | Colonel | Büttner, Wolfgang | DepCdr/3. LVD |
| 1975 | Colonel | Gleis, Wolfgang | Cdr Hubschraubergeschwader 34 (HG-34) |
| 1975 | LtCol | Berger, Rolf | Branch Chief Training Fighter Aviation (FA)/Fighter Bomber Aviation (FBA) Kdo. LSK/LV |
| 1975 | LtCol | Maxwitat, Karl-Heinz | Flight instructor/Fliegerausbildungsgeschwader 15 (FAG-15) |
| 1975 | LtCol | Oswald, Gerhard | Cdr Zieldarstellungsstaffel-33 (ZDS-33) |
| 1975 | LtCol | Schikor, Walter | Aviation Chain Cdr/ Transportfliegerstaffel 24 (TS-24) |
| 1975 | LtCol | Teil, Otto | Flight inspector/Transportfliegergeschwader 44 (TG-44) |
| 1976 | LtGen | Reinhold, Wolfgang | Deputy Ministers and Commander LSK/LV |
| 1976 | Colonel | Deisenroth, Karl-Heinz | DepCdr/1. LVD |
| 1976 | Colonel | Dittrich, Georg | DepCdr/Officer High School of the LSK/LV |
| 1976 | Colonel | Menges, Kurt | Cdr FAG-25 |
| 1976 | Colonel | Ullmann, Roland | Chief Navigator Kdo. LSK/LV |
| 1976 | LtCol | Bauer, Reiner | Cdr FBSqn/Jagdbombenfliegergeschwader-31 (JGB-31) |
| 1976 | LtCol | Bohla, Wolfgang | Navigator JG-7 |
| 1976 | LtCol | Schäbitz, Herbert | DepCdr FSqn/JG-2 |
| 1977 | MajGen | Baustian, Gerhard | DepCdr LSK/LV for the Air Force |
| 1977 | LtCol | Heichler, Reinhard | Flight inspector Kdo. LSK/LV |
| 1977 | LtCol | Jähn, Sigmund | Astronaut candidate |
| 1977 | LtCol | Köllner, Eberhard | Astronaut candidate |
| 1977 | LtCol | Kulitscher, Dieter | Cdr FAG-15 |
| 1977 | LtCol | Oldenburg, Alfred | Cdr HS-16 |
| 1977 | LtCol | Schönherr, Peter | Head Lufttaktik/Luftschießen JG-2 |
| 1977 | LtCol | Seifert, Manfred | Flight inspector/JG-7 |
| 1977 | LtCol | Wiedemann, Frank | Cdr FSqn/JG-3 |
| 1978 | LtCol | Anschütz, Bernd | Cdr FSqn/JG-1 |
| 1978 | LtCol | Bauer, Horst | Head Lufttaktik/Luftschießen 1. LVD |
| 1978 | LtCol | Becker, Horst | Flight instructor FAG-25 |
| 1978 | LtCol | Irmscher, Peter | A3 Fighter Aviation/3. LVD |
| 1978 | LtCol | Lüttkopf, Peter | DepCdr/HG-34 |
| 1978 | LtCol | Meyfarth, Rudolf | Cdr TASqn/TG-44 |
| 1978 | LtCol | Pastor, Siegmar | Stellvertreter FSqn/JG-3 |
| 1978 | LtCol | Pippig, Manfred | Cdr FAG-15 |
| 1978 | LtCol | Zimmermann, Klaus | Cdr JG-9 |
| 1979 | Captain at sea | Leithold, Günter | Cdr Marinehubschraubergeschwader 18 (MHG-18) |
| 1979 | LtCol | Häusler, Horst | DepCdr/FAG-15 |
| 1979 | LtCol | Kresse, Hasso | Flight inspector Kdo. LSK/LV |
| 1979 | LtCol | Lange, Kurt | DepCdr FSqn/FAG-25 |
| 1979 | LtCol | Lorenz, Siegfried | Navigator FSqn/JG-8 |
| 1979 | LtCol | Minkewitz, Peter | DepCdr FSqn/JG-1 |
| 1979 | LtCol | Pätz, Wolfgang | DepCdr/JG-9 |
| 1979 | LtCol | Priese, Horst | Cdr JG-2 |
| 1979 | LtCol | Weise, Siegfried | DepCdr/JBG-31 |
| 1979 | LtCol | Wolf, Gerald | Cdr HSqn/HG-34 |
| 1980 | Colonel | Fiß, Gerhard | DepCdr/ OHS of the LSK/LV |
| 1980 | Colonel | Golbs, Eberhard | Chief Navigator Kdo. LSK/LV |
| 1980 | LtCol | Berthold, Roland | Cdr TS-24 |
| 1980 | LtCol | Heise, Claus | Flight inspector 3. LVD |
| 1980 | LtCol | Junghans, Gunter | Cdr JG-7 |
| 1980 | LtCol | Petermann, Werner | Navigator FSqn/JG-2 |
| 1980 | LtCol | Unger, Jürgen | Cdr JBS/JBG-31 |
| 1980 | LtCol | Weiß, Manfred | Flight inspector HG-34 |
| 1981 | Colonel | Bienek, Klaus | Cdr FAG-25 |
| 1981 | Fkpt | Arndt, Manfred | DepCdr HSqn/MFG-18 |
| 1981 | LtCol | Driesel, Klaus | Head Air firing/Flight tactics JG-9 |
| 1981 | LtCol | Heinz, Günter | Chief sub branch Transport aviation Kdo. LSK/LV |
| 1981 | LtCol | Jandik, Karl-Heinz | Flight inspector HG-54 |
| 1981 | LtCol | Moos, Heinz | Cdr aviation chain HS-16 |
| 1981 | LtCol | Noak, Peter | DepCdr FSqn/JG-8 |
| 1981 | LtCol | Tetzel, Joachim | Flight inspector TS-24 |
| 1981 | LtCol | Wehner, Wolfgang | Flight inspector JG-3 |
| 1982 | Colonel | Thonke, Wolfgang | Cdr Fighter Aviation/Kdo. LSK/LV |
| 1982 | LtCol | Beutel, Gustav | Cdr FSqn/JG-7 |
| 1982 | LtCol | Biermann, Bernd | Head Air firing/Flight tactics HG- |
| 1982 | LtCol | Brucke, Joachim | KettenCdr JG-8 |
| 1982 | LtCol | Günther, Karl-Heinz | DepCdr FSqn/JG-9 |
| 1982 | LtCol | Jakob, Rainer | DepCdr/TG-44 |
| 1982 | LtCol | Müller, Rolf | Head Air firing/Flight tactics AS-31 |
| 1982 | LtCol | Petzold, Dieter | DepCdr/JG-2 |
| 1982 | LtCol | Schäfer, Heinz | DepCdr/FAG-25 |
| 1983 | Colonel | Kleemann, Dieter | Chef FrFK/Kdo. LSK/LV |
| 1983 | LtCol | Fischer, Bernd | DepCdr THSqn/THG-34 |
| 1983 | LtCol | Haufe, Christian | Chief navigator 1.LVD |
| 1983 | LtCol | Köhler, Peter | DepCdr FSqn/JG-9 |
| 1983 | LtCol | Neufeld, Hans | DepCdr FSqn/JG-7 |
| 1983 | LtCol | Ripl, Claus | Cdr Transportfliegerausbildungsstaffel 45 (TAS-45) |
| 1983 | LtCol | Schammer, Ulrich | Flight inspector FOFAFK |
| 1983 | LtCol | Seidel, Wolfgng | Flight inspector 3. LVD |
| 1983 | Fkpt | Weibezahl, Lutz | Dep A3 MHG-18 |
| 1983 | LtCol | Worm, Wolfgang | DepCdr FTSqn/FAG-15 |
| 1984 | Colonel | Dieckmann, Jürgen | Cdr JG-8 |
| 1984 | Colonel | Jenichen, Manfred | Cdr JBG-37 |
| 1984 | Colonel | Paul, Dieter | DepCdr 3. LVD |
| 1984 | Colonel | Richter, Henry | Professor section helicopter training/ OHS LSK/LV |
| 1984 | LtCol | Franz, Lothar | Navigator FSqn/JG-8 |
| 1984 | LtCol | Herzbecher, Gunter | Cdr JG-2 |
| 1984 | LtCol | Klocke, Bernd | Head Air firing/Flight tactics KHG-34 |
| 1984 | LtCol | Kubitz, Hans | DepCdr TSqn/TG-44 |
| 1984 | LtCol | Skeris, Manfred | Head training Fighter Aviation 1. LVD |
| 1984 | LtCol | Worm, Werner | Flight inspector FAG-15 |
| 1985 | Colonel | Gleitsmann, Karl-Heinz | Branch chief training Fighter Aviatoion/Kdo. LSK/LV |
| 1985 | Colonel | Langener, Rainer | Cdr JAG-15 |
| 1985 | LtCol | Fischer, Albrecht | Cdr TSqn/TG-44 |
| 1985 | LtCol | Kurzhals, Rainer | Chief navigator 3. LVD |
| 1985 | LtCol | Pilz, Bernd | DepCdr/THG-34 |
| 1985 | LtCol | Rösler, Werner | Head working group Front Aviation/Kdo. LSK/LV |
| 1985 | LtCol | Stammberger, Heinz | Cdr aviation chain JG-3 |
| 1985 | LtCol | Reichel, Siegfried | Cdr aviation chain TS-24 |
| 1985 | Major | Rolof, Christian | 1. Aircraft pilot TS-24 |
| 1985 | Major | Stübner, Hermann | 1. Aircraft pilot TS-24 |
| 1986 | LtCol | Beutel, Reinhard | Navigator FSqn/JG-2 |
| 1986 | LtCol | Fritsch, Peter | DepCdr/JG-1 |
| 1986 | LtCol | Gyurkewitsch, Gerd | DepCdr/ Army Aviation Operations Command |
| 1986 | LtCol | Hoffmann, Joachim | Cdr JBG-37 |
| 1986 | LtCol | Patzer, Rudolf | Flight inspector Kdo. LSK/LV |
| 1986 | LtCol | Rehfeld, Siegfried | DepCdr/JG-7 |
| 1986 | LtCol | Straßburg, Rainer | Flight inspector 1.LVD |
| 1986 | Fkpt | Thate, Heinz | Cdr HSqn/MHG-18 |
| 1986 | LtCol | Walter, K-Heinz | Cdr FSqn/JG-9 |
| 1987 | Colonel | Pampel, Frank | Cdr JG-7 |
| 1987 | Colonel | Reuschel, Gerhard | Cdr JG-3 |
| 1987 | LtCol | Bornschein, Eberhard | Flight inspector 1. LVD |
| 1987 | LtCol | Böttger, Hermann | DepCdr FS/JG-9 |
| 1987 | LtCol | Manigk, Manfred | Cdr aviation chain JBG-77 |
| 1987 | LtCol | Seidel, Günter | DepCdr FSqn/JG-3 |
| 1987 | Fkpt | Zeschmann, Klaus | Cdr HSqn/MHG-18 |
| 1988 | Colonel | Kernchen, Wilfried | Cdr JG-1 |
| 1988 | Colonel | Wukasch, Ralf | Cdr JG-9 |
| 1988 | LtCol | Andreas, Peter | Flight inspector OHS for military pilots |
| 1988 | LtCol | Dalsch, Gerhard | AL JFK/1. LVD |
| 1988 | LtCol | Härtel, Lothar | Sub branch Flight Safety Kdo. LSK/LV |
| 1988 | LtCol | Nützmann, Erwin | Cdr FSqn/JG-3 |
| 1988 | LtCol | Tröger, Udo | Cdr aviation chain JG-7 |
| 1988 | LtCol | Wöge, Hans-Peter | Flight inspector THG-34 |
| 1989 | Colonel | Weber, Rudolf | Chief Navigator Kdo. LSK/LV |
| 1989 | LtCol | Exner, Peter | Head Training Fighter Aviation 3. LVD |
| 1989 | LtCol | Kernchen, Michael | Cdr JG-8 |
| 1989 | LtCol | Krummhaar, Klaus | Cdr Taktische Aufklärungsfliegerstaffel (TAFS-47) |
| 1989 | LtCol | Ressel, Rudolf | DepCdr/TG-44 |
| 1989 | LtCol | Roske, Jürgen | Cdr Marinefliegergeschwader 28 (MFG-28) |

== See also ==
- Honoured Military Pilot of the USSR
