= Vostok 5 =

1963 Soviet spaceflight

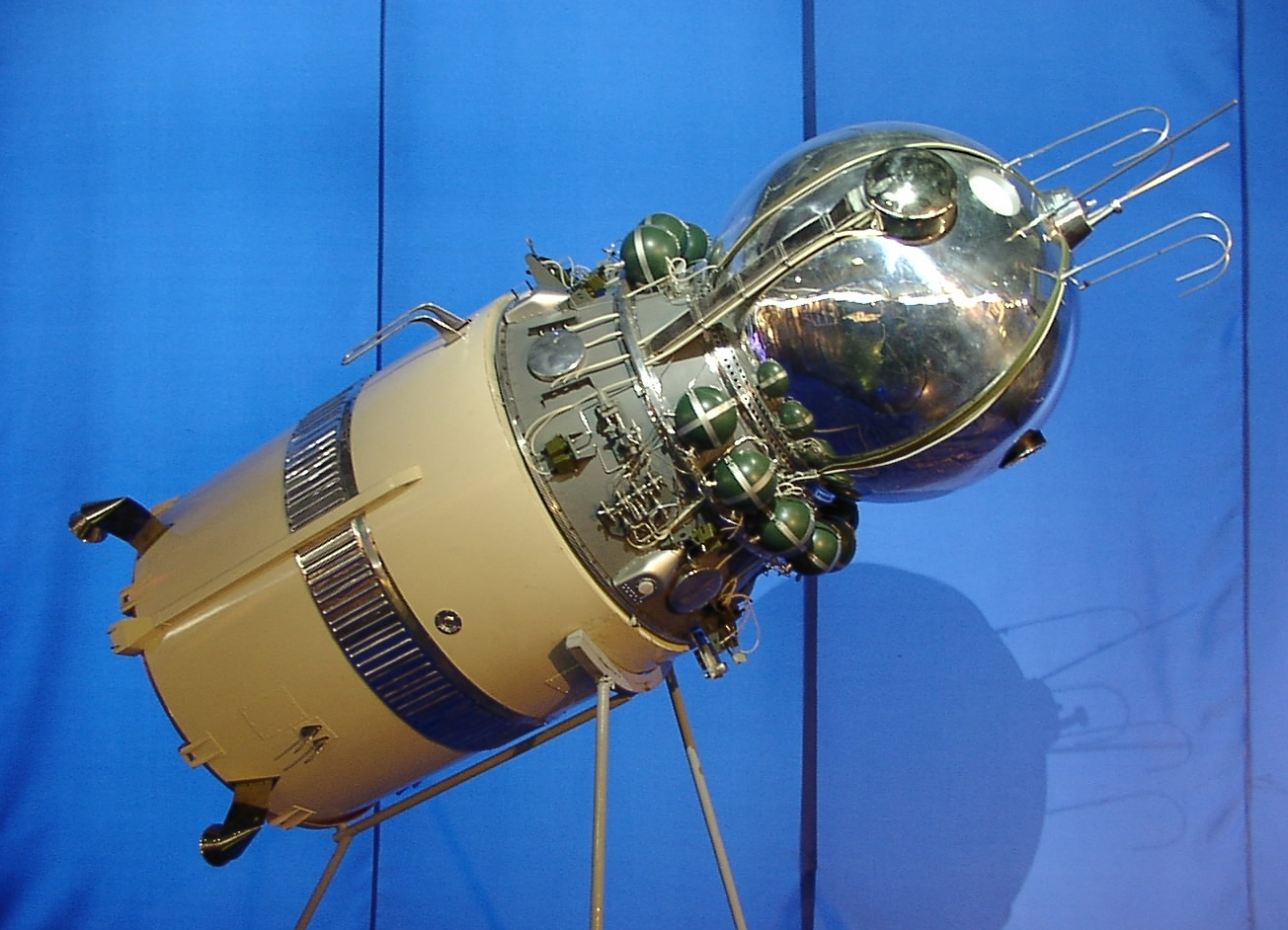
- Model of the Vostok capsule with its upper stage
- Operator: Soviet space program
- COSPAR ID: 1963-020A
- SATCAT no.: 591
- Mission duration: 4 days, 23 hours, 7 minutes
- Orbits completed: 82

Spacecraft properties
- Spacecraft: Vostok-3KA No.7
- Manufacturer: Experimental Design Bureau OKB-1
- Launch mass: 4,720 kilograms (10,410 lb)

Crew
- Crew size: 1
- Members: Valery Bykovsky
- Callsign: Ястреб (Yastreb - "Hawk")

Start of mission
- Launch date: 14 June 1963, 11:58:58 UTC
- Rocket: Vostok-K 8K72K
- Launch site: Baikonur 1/5

End of mission
- Landing date: 19 June 1963, 11:06 UTC
- Landing site: 53.39777°N 67.60500°E

Orbital parameters
- Reference system: Geocentric
- Regime: Low Earth
- Eccentricity: 0.00358
- Perigee altitude: 162 kilometres (101 mi)
- Apogee altitude: 209 kilometres (130 mi)
- Inclination: 65 degrees
- Period: 88.4 minutes
- Epoch: 15 June 1963, 08:00:00 UTC
- Vostok program

Vostok 5 (Russian: Восток-5, lit. 'Orient 5' or 'East 5') was a joint mission of the Soviet space program together with Vostok 6; as with the previous pair of Vostok 3 and Vostok 4 the two Vostok spacecraft came close to one another in orbit and established a radio link.

Vostok 5 launched on 14 June 1963, and returned to Earth on 19 June, and was piloted by Valery Bykovsky.

== Mission ==
Several delays plagued the prelaunch preparations of Vostok 5, the biggest being concern over elevated solar flare activity. At this early phase, it was not well understood what effects this might have on the spacecraft and its passenger, so the planned launch date of 11 June was postponed a few days. On the 14th, Bykovsky was strapped into the capsule awaiting liftoff when further delays occurred. A gyroscope in the Blok E stage malfunctioned and needed to be replaced, but this would mean removing the propellants from the booster, taking it down from the pad back to the vehicle assembly building, and delaying the launch another several days. It was decided to take the calculated risk of simply doing the repair work on the fully fueled launch vehicle. A replacement gyroscope was quickly installed and liftoff took place at 2:59 PM Moscow time. One last minor problem popped up when a pad umbilical failed to disconnect, but as soon as the booster began lifting, it was yanked out. The launch proceeded without any difficulties, although the Blok E stage slightly underperformed and put the spacecraft into a lower-than-intended orbit at 108×137 miles (175×222 kilometers) versus the normal 112×146 miles (181×235 kilometers).

Cosmonaut Valery Bykovsky was originally intended to stay in orbit for eight days, but the mission details changed many times due to elevated levels of solar flare activity at the time and he was eventually ordered back after five days. This remains the record for solo crewed flight in Earth orbit. In addition, the low orbit of the spacecraft made it uncertain as to whether decay would not occur in under eight days. This combined with solar flare activity affecting the diameter of the Earth's atmosphere might potentially introduce drag that could not only cause premature reentry, but result in Vostok 5 landing almost anywhere on Earth.

Bykovsky performed a couple of simple scientific experiments in orbit and also practiced exercise and testing his body's reactions to weightlessness. In the postflight debriefing, he would say that the overall design of the spacecraft was good, but the clock was in a location that made it hard to see and the instrument panel was placed too far away. The first aid kit could not be reached at all without unstrapping from the seat. Like Valentina Tereshkova, he noted that the helmet headset produced sharp, unpleasant noise. He described the food as generally of good quality, although it probably should not be eaten before launch.

A problem with the spacecraft's waste collection system is reported to have made conditions "unpleasant" in the capsule. The only other difficulty encountered was that, like on Vostok 1 and Vostok 2, the re-entry module failed to separate cleanly from the service module when it was time for Bykovsky to come home and he experienced several seconds of sharp vibrations following separations.

The Vostok 5 landing coordinates were 53.39777°N 67.60500°E, 2 km northwest of Karatal, North Kazakhstan, Kazakhstan; and 550 km northwest of Karagandy, Kazakhstan. A group of local farmers greeted Bykovsky prior to rescue crews arriving. At the landing location is a small fenced park with two monuments. One monument is a 10-meter tall silver rectangle with a small stone marker nearby listing the date of the landing. The second monument is an L-shaped sandy colored stone structure. One leg of the "L" is an observation deck with stairs leading to it. The other leg of the "L" has a space-themed mural carved into the stone face. The mural depicts a floating cosmonaut in a spacesuit surrounded by stars, telescopes, planets, and the Sun.

The re-entry capsule is on display at the Tsiolkovsky Museum in Kaluga.

== Pilot ==
Position	Crew
Pilot	Valery Bykovsky; First spaceflight

=== Backup ===
Position	Crew
Pilot	Boris Volynov

=== Reserve ===
Position	Crew
Pilot	Alexei Leonov

== Mission parameters ==
- Mass 4,720 kg (10,410 lb)
- Apogee: 235 km (146 mi)
- Perigee: 181 km (112 mi)
- Inclination: 64.9°
- Period: 88.4 minutes
