= Heinz Hoffmann =

German politician

Army General Heinz Hoffmann
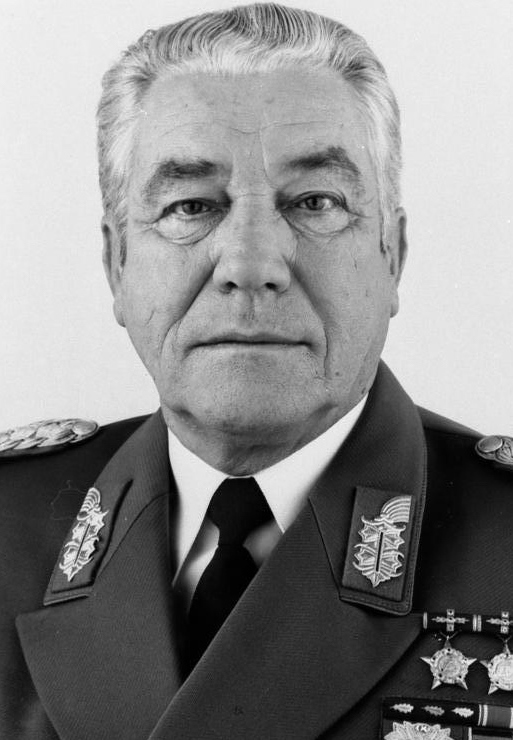
- Hoffman in 1982

Minister of National Defense
- In office 14 July 1960 – 2 December 1985
- Chairman of the Council of Ministers: Otto Grotewohl; Willi Stoph; Horst Sindermann; Willi Stoph
- Preceded by: Willi Stoph
- Succeeded by: Heinz Keßler

Chief of Staff of the National People's Army
- In office 1 March 1958 – 1 July 1960
- Minister: Willi Stoph
- Preceded by: Vincenz Müller
- Succeeded by: Sigfrid Riedel
Volkskammer
Member of the Volkskammer for Strausberg
In office 9 August 1950 – 2 December 1985
Preceded by	Kurt Fischer

Personal details
- Born: Karl-Heinz Hoffmann; 28 November 1910 Mannheim, Grand Duchy of Baden, German Empire (now Baden-Württemberg, Germany)
- Died: 2 December 1985 (aged 75) Strausberg, Bezirk Frankfurt (Oder), German Democratic Republic
- Resting place: Berlin, Germany
- Party: Socialist Unity Party (1946–1985)
- Other political affiliations: Communist Party of Germany (1930–1946)
- Spouses: Klavdiya Ivanovna Knjazeva (m. 1940; died 1952) Halina (m. 1954; div. 1964) Gisela Sauer (m. 1964)
- Children: 7
- Education: International Lenin School; Frunze Military Academy; K. Е. Voroshilov Higher Military Academy
- Nickname: Heinz Roth

Military service
- Allegiance: Spanish Republic; Soviet Union; German Democratic Republic
- Branch/service: International Brigades; Land Forces of the National People's Army
- Years of service: 1937–1985
- Rank: Armeegeneral
- Commands: Hans Beimler Battalion
- Battles/wars: Spanish Civil War (WIA)
- Central institution membership: 1973–1985: Full member, Politburo of the Central Committee; 1952–1985: Full member, Central Committee; 1950–1952: Candidate member, Central Committee; Other offices held: 1960–1985: Member, National Defence Council; 1957–1960: First Deputy Minister, Ministry of National Defense; 1952–1955: Head, Barracked People's Police; 1950–1955: Deputy Minister, Ministry of the Interior

Karl-Heinz Hoffmann (28 November 1910 – 2 December 1985) was a German military officer and politician who served as the Minister of National Defense in the Council of Ministers of the German Democratic Republic, and as a member of the Politburo of the Central Committee of the Socialist Unity Party (SED).

== Youth ==
Born in Mannheim, Grand Duchy of Baden, Hoffmann came from a working-class family. After attending school in Mannheim, he spent the 1925 – 1930 period learning to be an engine fitter at MWM (Motoren Werke Mannheim AG). From 1926 to 1930 he was a member of the Young Communist League of Germany, followed by membership in the Communist Party of Germany (KPD). During this time Hoffman served several short prison sentences for participating in demonstrations and fights.

== Immigration ==
After the rise of the Nazi Party in 1933, he was faced with a warrant for his arrest. Hoffmann fled Germany and immigrated to the Soviet Union by the way of Switzerland and Czechoslovakia. Until 1945 he used the alias "Heinz Roth," which is the reason why he used Heinz as his first name rather than his given name Karl-Heinz. In the Soviet Union he attended the International Lenin School in Moscow.

== Service in the Spanish Civil War ==
For a few months in 1936 and 1937 he attended military school in Ryazan conducted by the Frunze Military Academy in preparation for service with the Republican forces in Spain. Upon graduation he was given the rank of Lieutenant. From 1937 to 1938 he served in the XI International Brigade in the Spanish Civil War. Under the pseudonym "Heinz Roth" he was a Battery Commissar in the Hans Beimler Battalion. He took command of the Battalion after his commander was wounded. He himself was severely wounded in the legs and abdomen by infantry gunfire south of Quijorna. Hoffmann was hospitalized in Madrid for a few months then later moved to a clinic in Eaubone, France where he recovered from 1938 to 1939. From April 1939 to November 1940, he continued to recover from his injuries in the Soviet Union.

== Training in the Soviet Union ==
Starting in March 1941, he attended a special course of the Comintern in Pushkino, northwest of Moscow. In addition to an extensive social science training he was also taught military subjects. This included training in rear area sabotage with other German exiles. He was medically disqualified from training after parachute jumps aggravated his earlier leg wounds. Hoffmann was then selected to work in German prisoner of war camps after assisting the Soviet NKVD in interrogating prisoners. From 1942 to 1944, Hoffmann was a teacher at the Antifascist School, first in the territory of Gorky, and later in Krasnogorsk. By 1945, Hoffman headed the Party School No. 12 in Moscow.

== Party functionary in the Soviet Occupation Zone and East Germany ==
In January 1946, Hoffmann returned to Berlin and was initially on the personal staff of Wilhelm Pieck, and later the staff of Walter Ulbricht. From 1950 until his death, Hoffmann was a member of the Volkskammer, the East German parliament, and was a candidate for the Central Committee of the Socialist Unity Party of Germany (SED). In 1952 he joined the Central Committee of the SED. Hoffmann belonged to the Politburo of the SED from 1973 until his death in 1985.

== Military career ==
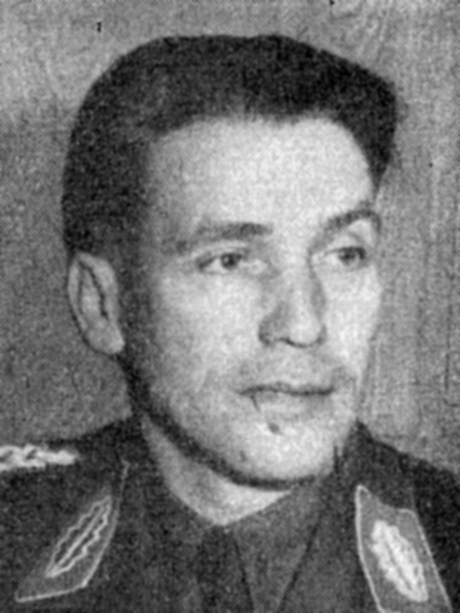
Hoffmann's official Volkskammer portrait, 1954

Starting in 1949, Hoffmann was involved in the establishment of the East German armed forces. He was first vice president of the German Administration of the Interior and head of the Department of Political Culture with the rank of inspector general. In 1950, Hoffmann was appointed head of the Main Administration for Training (HVA), the immediate predecessor of the Barracked People's Police. During the establishment of Kasernierte Volkspolizei (KVP) he was on 1 July 1952 made their chief, being promoted to lieutenant-general in October 1952. Hoffmann held that position until 1955. From 1955 to 1957 Hoffmann studied at the Voroshilov General Staff Academy of the Soviet Union. Due to this training he was not in East Germany when the new National People's Army was founded.

After his return from the Soviet Union, he served from 1957 to 1960 as the first Deputy Minister of National Defense, and from 1958 to 1960 also serving as the chief of staff. In 1959 he was promoted to colonel-general and in 1961 to army general. In 1960, Hoffmann was promoted as the successor of Willi Stoph as Minister of National Defense of the GDR serving in that position until his death. With the elevation to the office of the Minister, he also became a member of the National Defense Council.

After his death, the 9th Armored Division of the East German Army was named after Heinz Hoffmann, as well as the Grottkauer Straße in Berlin district of Hellersdorf was renamed Heinz-Hoffmann-Straße.

== Family ==
Hoffman married Klavdiya "Klava" Ivanovna Knjazeva, whom he met in 1940 while living in Peredelkino. She died on 28 March 1952. They had two sons, Jura and Sascha. The youngest son, Sascha, died 20 years later in a traffic accident soon after graduating from officer training as a lieutenant in the National People's Army.

In 1954, Hoffmann married a nurse, Halina, who worked in a government hospital. They had two children and divorced in 1964.

Later in 1964 he married his chief secretary, Master Sergeant Gisela Sauer. They had three children and remained married until his death in 1985.

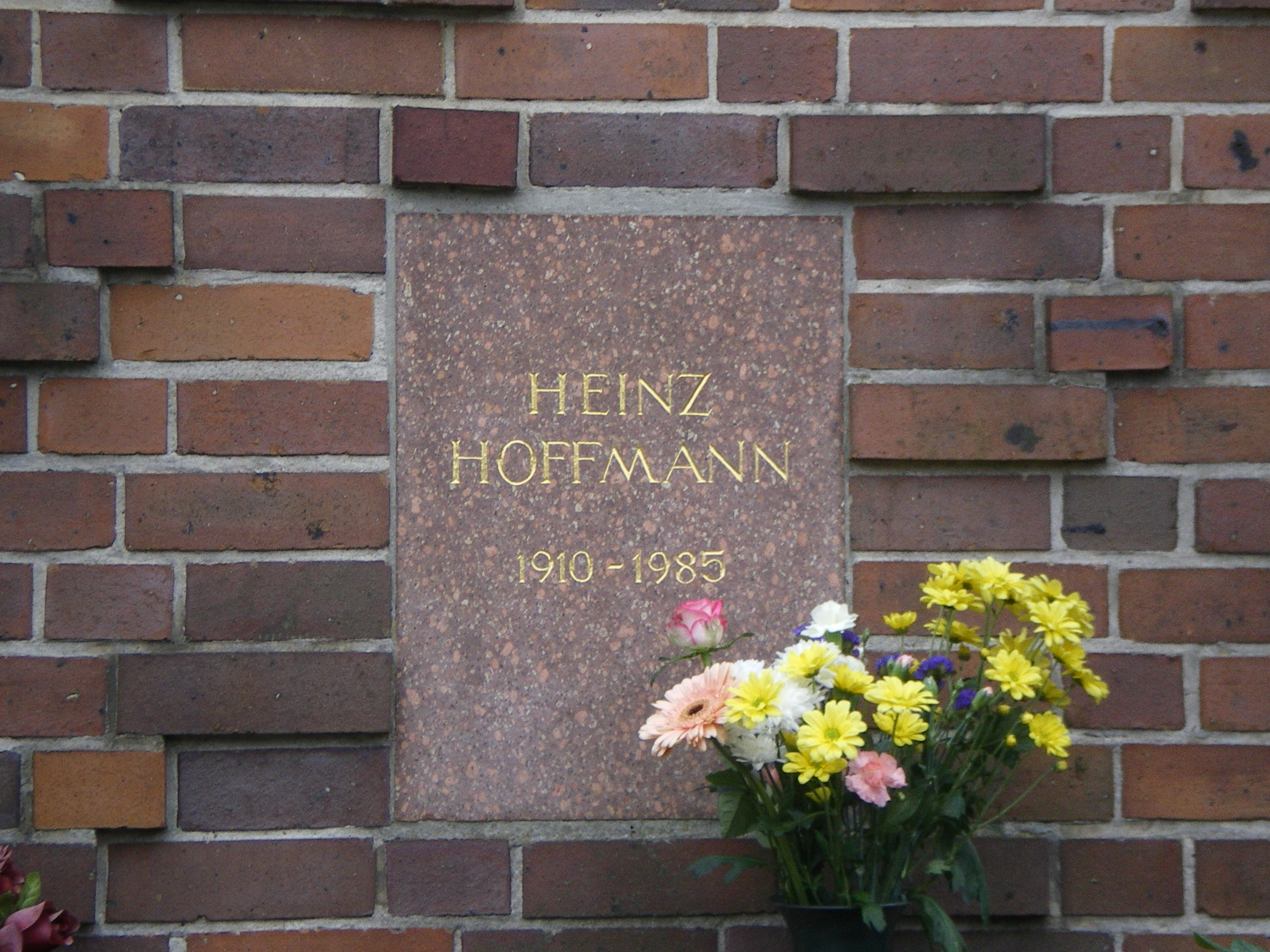
Heinz Hoffmann's grave on Gedenkstätte der Sozialisten on Zentralfriedhof Friedrichsfelde in East-Berlin Photo by Stian Nordskog

== Awards and honors ==
- 1954: Patriotic Order of Merit (Vaterländischer Verdienstorden)
- 1965: Order of the Red Banner
- 1970: Order of Karl Marx
- 1974: Order of Lenin
- 1974: Scharnhorst Order
- 1975: Hero of the German Democratic Republic
- 1975: Honorary doctorate degree (Dr. h.c.) in philosophy from the Party Academy "Karl Marx"
- 1980: Hero of the German Democratic Republic
- 1980: Order of Karl Marx
- 1980: Order of Lenin
- 1985: Order of Karl Marx

== Sources ==
- Mannheim, Madrid, Moskau. Erlebtes aus drei Jahrzehnten. 4. Auflage: Militärverlag der Deutschen Demokratischen Republik, Berlin 1986. ISBN 3-327-00208-8
- Moskau, Berlin. Erinnerungen an Freunde, Kampfgenossen und Zeitumstände. Militärverlag der Deutschen Demokratischen Republik, Berlin 1989. ISBN 3-327-00888-4
- Klaus Froh, Rüdiger Wenzke: Die Generale und Admirale der NVA. Ein biographisches Handbuch. 4. Auflage. Ch. Links, Berlin 2000, ISBN 3-86153-209-3
