= Soyuz 31 =

1978 Soviet crewed spaceflight to Salyut 6

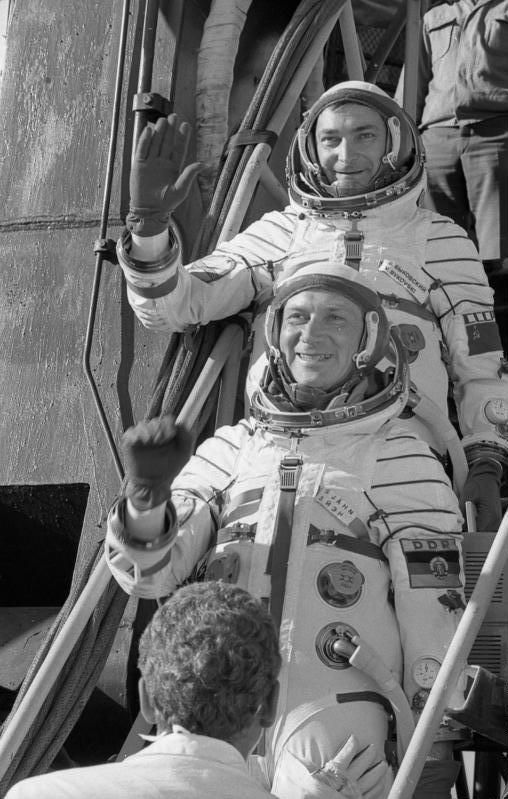
- Bykowski (above) and Jähn (below)
- Operator: Soviet space program
- COSPAR ID: 1978-081A
- SATCAT no.: 11010
- Mission duration: Capsule: 67 days, 20 hours and 12 minutes Original crew: 7 days, 20 hours and 49 minutes

Spacecraft properties
- Spacecraft type: Soyuz 7K-T
- Manufacturer: NPO Energia
- Launch mass: 6,800 kg (15,000 lb)

Crew
- Crew size: 2
- Launching: Valery Bykovsky; Sigmund Jähn
- Landing: Vladimir Kovalyonok; Aleksandr Ivanchenkov
- Callsign: Ястреб (Yastreb - "Hawk")

Start of mission
- Launch date: 26 August 1978, 14:51:30 UTC
- Rocket: Soyuz-U
- Launch site: Baikonur 1/5

End of mission
- Landing date: 2 November 1978, 11:04:17 UTC
- Landing site: 140 km (87 mi) SE of Dzhezkazgan

Orbital parameters
- Reference system: Geocentric
- Regime: Low Earth
- Perigee altitude: 196.8 km (122.3 mi)
- Apogee altitude: 259.9 km (161.5 mi)
- Inclination: 51.64 degrees
- Period: 88.81 minutes

Docking with Salyut 6
- Docking port: Aft port
- Docking date: 28 August 1978, 16:37:37 UTC
- Undocking date: 7 September 1978, 16:37:37 UTC
- Time docked: 10 days

Redocking with Salyut 6
- Redocking port: Front port
- Redocking date: 7 September 1978, 16:37:37 UTC
- Unredocking date: 2 November 1978, 11:04:17 UTC
- Time redocked: 55 days, 18 hours and 26 minutes
- Soyuz programme

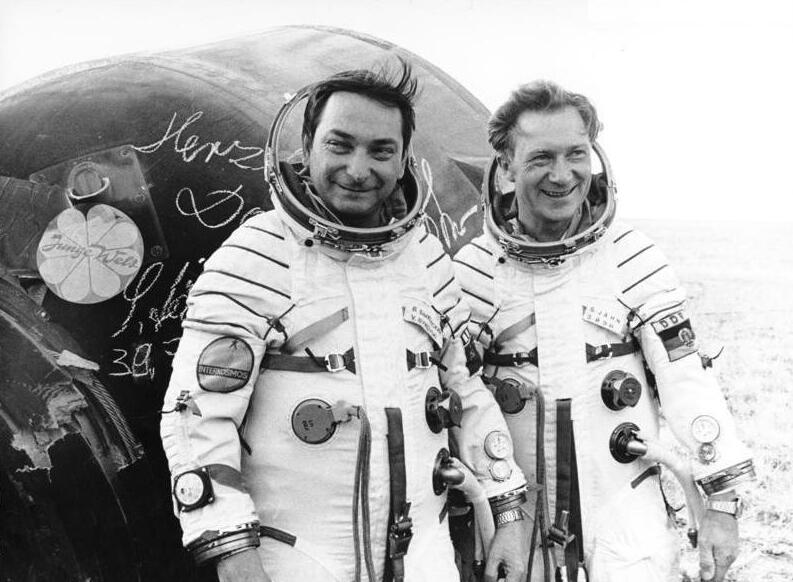
Valery Bykovsky with Sigmund Jähn

Soyuz 31 (Russian: Союз 31, Union 31) was a 1978 Soviet crewed space flight to the Salyut 6 space station. It was the seventh mission to and sixth successful docking at the orbiting facility. The Soyuz 31 crew were the second to visit the long-duration Soyuz 29 resident crew.

Soyuz 31 carried Valery Bykovsky and Sigmund Jähn, the first German cosmonaut, into space. They swapped Soyuz craft with the long-duration crew and returned to Earth in Soyuz 29, the resident crew returned to Earth in Soyuz 31.

== Crew ==
Prime crew
Position	Launching cosmonaut	Landing cosmonaut
Commander	Valery Bykovsky; Third and last spaceflight	Vladimir Kovalyonok; Second spaceflight
Research cosmonaut/flight engineer	Sigmund Jähn, Interkosmos; Only spaceflight	Aleksandr Ivanchenkov; First spaceflight

Backup crew
Position	Crew
Commander	Viktor Gorbatko
Research cosmonaut	Eberhard Köllner, Interkosmos

== Mission parameters ==
- Mass: 6,800 kg (15,000 lb)
- Perigee: 196.8 km (122.3 mi)
- Apogee: 259.9 km (161.5 mi)
- Inclination: 51.64°
- Period: 88.81 minutes

== Mission highlights ==
Soyuz 31, the third Intercosmos flight, was launched 26 August 1978. Cosmonauts Bykovsky and Jähn were greeted by resident crew Vladimir Kovalyonok and Aleksandr Ivanchenkov when they docked at the aft port of the Salyut 6 space station the next day. The visitors brought with them fresh onions, garlic, lemons, apples and other food for the long-duration crew, then in space for more than two months.

The presence of the East German cosmonaut was seen as significant because of the presence of the MKF-6M camera on the space station, built by the Carl Zeiss works at Jena. Medical and biological experiments were carried out, including an audio experiment which tested sound and noise perception limits. An experiment called Berolina used the Splav furnace to process an ampoule of bismuth and antimonide with the material between two plates in the ampoule. The tree structure which resulted was four to six times larger than what had been produced on the ground. Another experiment tested using different photographic films on the station's interior.

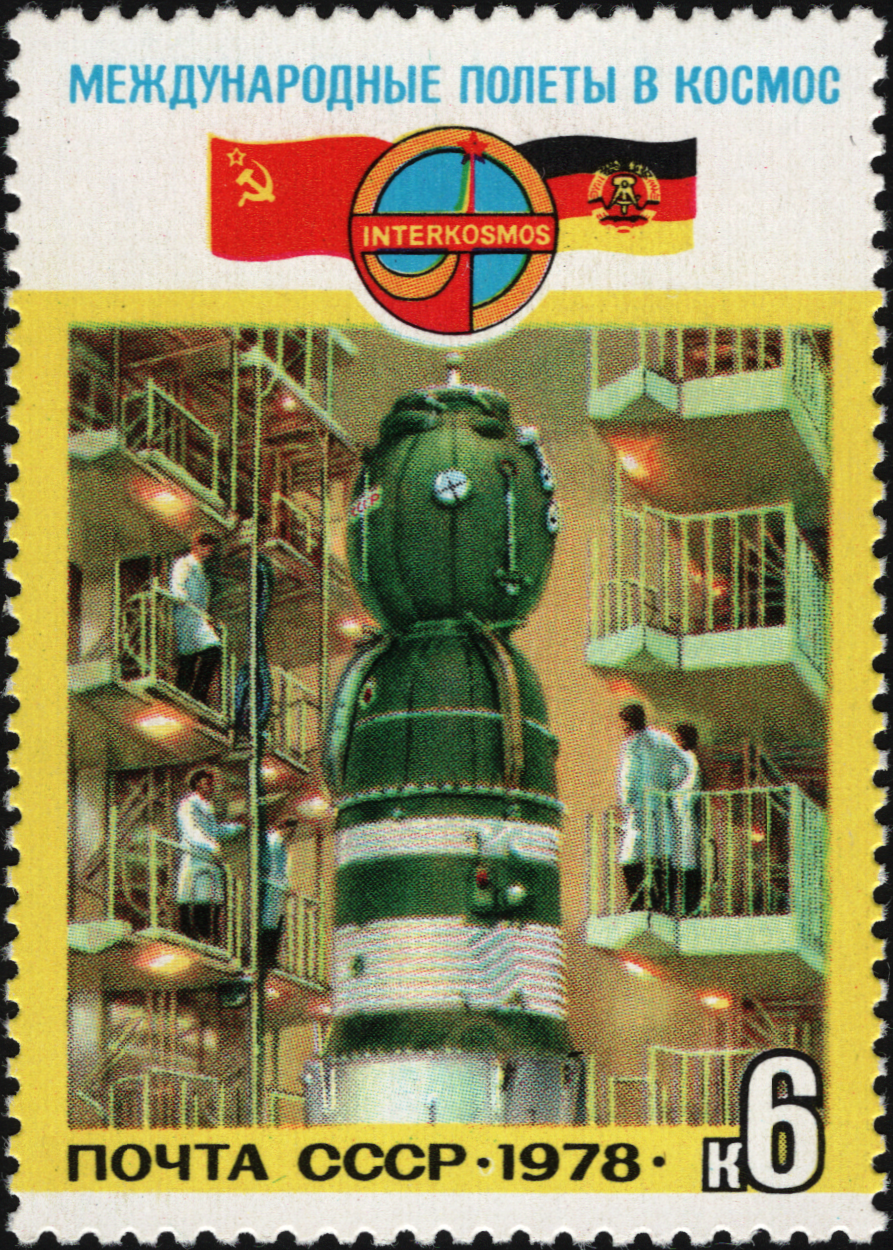
Assembly of Soyuz 31 on a 1978 USSR stamp

The Soyuz 31 crew swapped craft with the Soyuz 29 crew so as to supply the long-duration crew with a fresh craft. On September 2, the engines of Soyuz 29 were tested, 25 experiment containers with 100 experimental results were transferred, along with exposed film, and seat liners and centering weights were exchanged. The Soyuz 31 crew left in Soyuz 29 the next day and landed 140 km southeast of Dzhezkazgan.

The standard recovery procedure was changed with this flight, observers noted. In the past, the recovery of a civilian Salyut crew had been made on the orbit following the one which provided a nominal launch opportunity to Salyut. With this and subsequent flights, the landing occurred during the orbit which provided the nominal launch opportunity. The effect of this change was to have a landing window open some two to three days earlier than otherwise.

The crew on the station subsequently boarded the Soyuz 31 vehicle and redocked it to the forward port, thus freeing the aft port for a forthcoming Progress supply ship. They returned to Earth 2 November in the craft after setting a new space-endurance record of 139 days.
