= Valery Bykovsky =

Soviet cosmonaut (1934–2019)

- Валерий Быковский
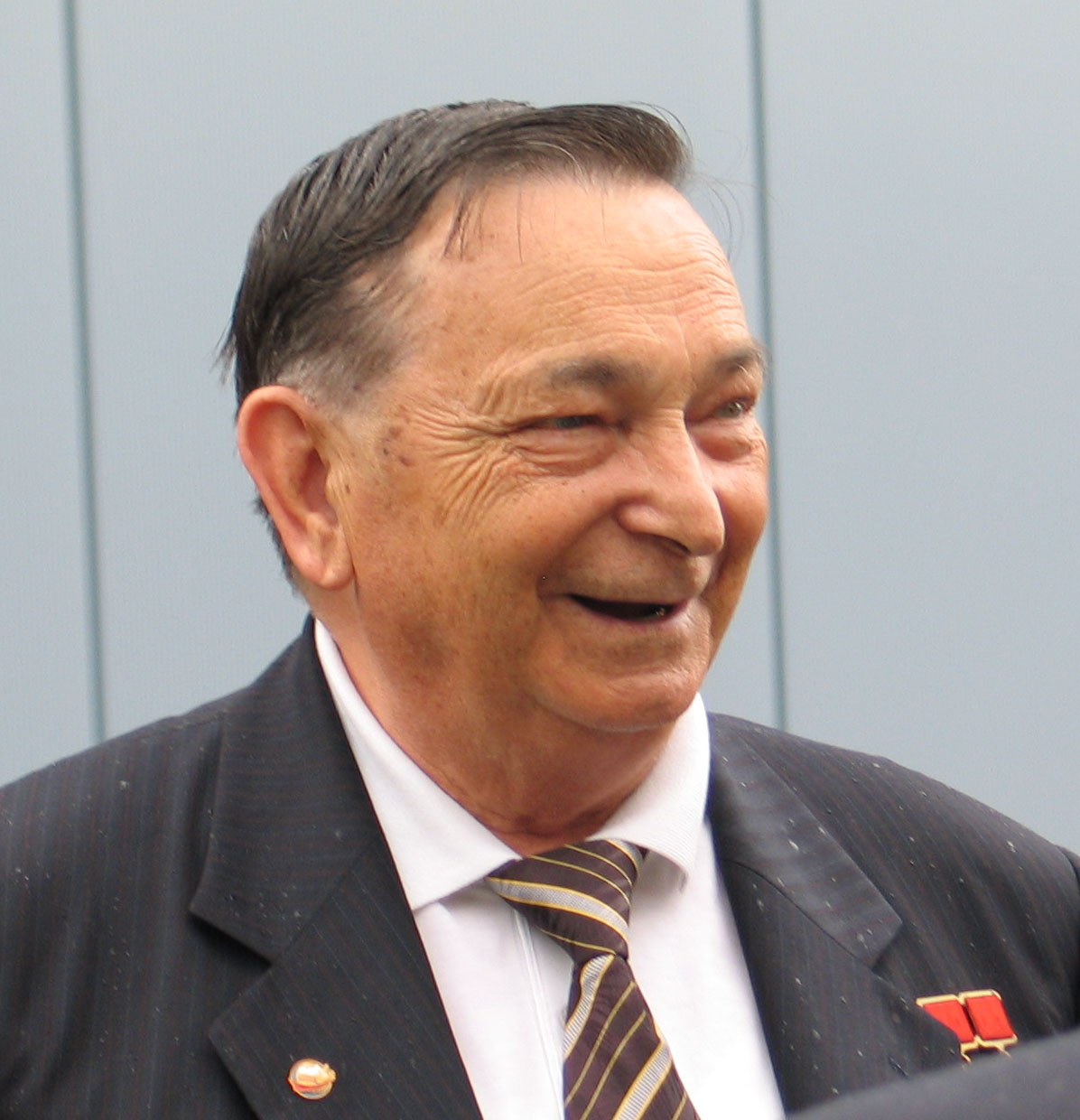
- Bykovsky in 2008
- Born: Valery Fyodorovich Bykovsky; 2 August 1934; Pavlovsky Posad, Russian SFSR, Soviet Union
- Died: 27 March 2019 (aged 84)
- Occupation: Pilot
- Awards: Hero of the Soviet Union; Order of Lenin
- Space career

Cosmonaut
- Rank: Major General; Soviet Air Force
- Time in space: 20d 17h 48m
- Selection: 1960 Air Force Group 1
- Missions: Vostok 5, Soyuz 22, Soyuz 31/Soyuz 29

Valery Fyodorovich Bykovsky (Russian: Вале́рий Фёдорович Быко́вский; 2 August 1934 – 27 March 2019) was a Soviet cosmonaut who flew on three space flights: Vostok 5, Soyuz 22, and Soyuz 31. He was also backup for Vostok 3 and Soyuz 37.

== Early life and career ==
Born in Pavlovsky Posad, Russia, on 2 August 1934, Bykovsky was the son of Fyodor Fyodorovich Bykovsky and Klavdia Ivanova. He had an older sister named Margrita, born three years earlier. When he was four years old, World War II began, forcing the family to move to Kuybyshev, and later again to Syzran, before moving back to near Moscow. By the age of 14, Bykovsky wanted to attend naval school; however, his father was not a proponent of this idea and encouraged him to stay at his school. A few days later, Bykovsky attended a lecture on the Soviet Air Force Club which inspired him to pursue his dream of becoming a pilot. He began flight theory lessons when he was 16 at the Moscow City Aviation Club.

Bykovsky graduated from aviation school aged 18 and enrolled in the Kachinsk Military Aviation Academy. He served as a fighter pilot and later as an instructor pilot, training other pilots on fighter aircraft. During his military service, Bykovsky logged over 5,000 hours of flying time on various types of aircraft, including jet fighters and bombers.

Bykovsky also had a passion for aviation research and experimentation. He was involved in several research programs aimed at improving the performance and safety of military aircraft. One of the programs he participated in was the development of the Tupolev Tu-16 jet bomber, which was used by the Soviet Air Force from the 1950s to the 1980s. Bykovsky was also involved in the testing of new jet engines and aviation equipment. In the 1950s, he participated in the testing of the Mikoyan-Gurevich MiG-19 jet fighter, which was the first Soviet production aircraft capable of supersonic flight.

He graduated from the academy at 21 years old and received the rank of lieutenant. By the time he began his cosmonaut training, he had done over 72 parachute jumps.

== Cosmonaut career ==
=== Vostok programme ===
At 26 years old, he started his cosmonaut training at Zhukovsky Military Engineering academy. Although an exceptional pilot in his own right Bykovsky was not part of the original "Vanguard Six" assigned to the Vostok mission, however, due to a back injury sustained by Valentin Varlamov, Bykovksy was added to the group. His first assignment was as the backup pilot to the Vostok 3 mission.

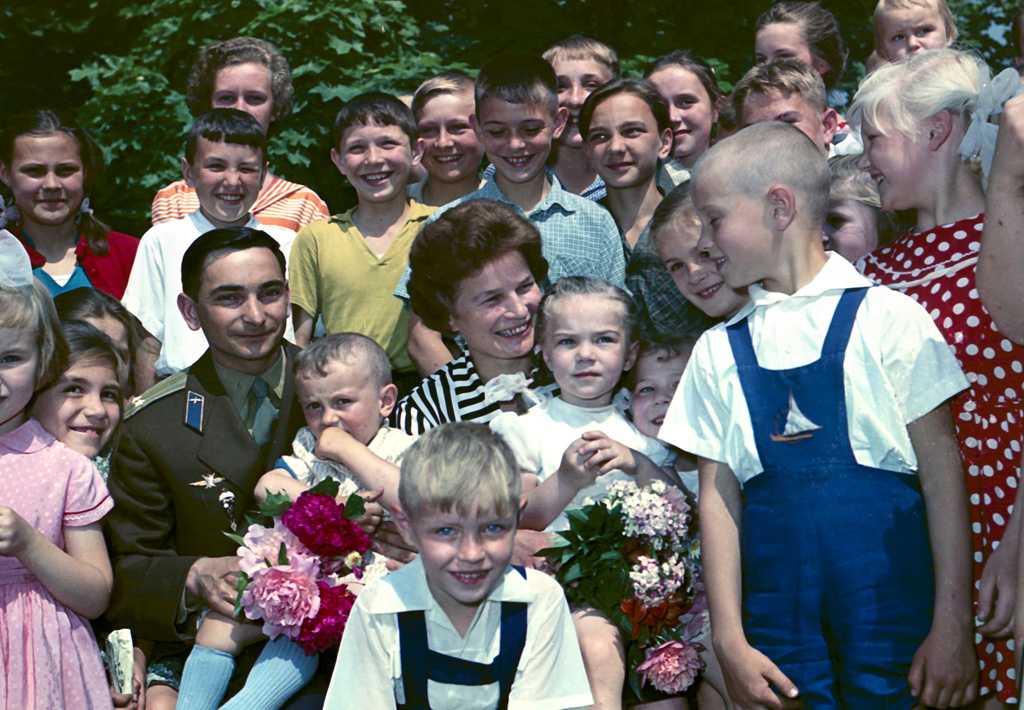
Bykovsky and Valentina Tereshkova with children, c. 1963

He launched on the Vostok 5 mission from Baikonur Cosmodrome in Kazakhstan on 14 June 1963. During the flight he conducted experiments, such as photographing the Earth's horizon and documenting the growth of peas. He also floated about in the cabin and adjusted the spacecraft orientation numerous times. Two days into his flight, Valentina Tereshkova flew the Vostok 6 spacecraft within five kilometres of Bykovsky's. Bykovsky set a space endurance record of five days in orbit where his call-sign was "Hawk" (Russian: Ястреб). Although this duration has been surpassed by multi-crew flights, it remains the record for a solo spaceflight. He also performed the first human bowel movement in space, at 9 hours and 5 minutes into the mission.

He was given his nation's highest honour, "Hero of The Soviet Union" for his contribution to Soviet spaceflight. During his Vostok 5 mission, Bykovsky was also made a member of the Communist Party. He was promoted to colonel on 30 April 1966.

On June 25, 1963, Bykovsky and Tereshkova went to Moscow University for a press conference where Bykovsky was quoted by The Times describing how weightlessness affected him: "The muscles of the arms feel extremely light; you lift a hand without any effort, you pick up something-and it weighs nothing. You get accustomed to this, but not at once."

=== Soyuz programme ===
Bykovsky was assigned to be the commander of the original Soyuz 2 mission, which was planned to be launched soon after Soyuz 1. Two of the three crewmen from Soyuz 2 were to conduct an extravehicular activity (EVA) and enter Soyuz 1. During the Soyuz 1 flight, many concurrent problems forced mission control to command an early reentry of the spacecraft. This also caused them to cancel the Soyuz 2 flight as no rendezvous could occur. On Soyuz 1, tube holding the main parachute was too rough, which created enough friction that the drogue parachute was unable to pull it out. The spacecraft struck the ground at approximately 93 miles per hour, killing Vladimir Komarov. As the Soyuz 2 capsule was made with the same specifications as Soyuz 1, if the mission had flown Bykovsky and his crew would have been killed.

He flew the Soyuz 22 mission with Vladimir Aksyonov. The mission launched on 15 September 1976. The capsule was originally a backup for the Apollo–Soyuz Test Project (ASTP). The main purpose of the mission was studying and practising Earth observation techniques.

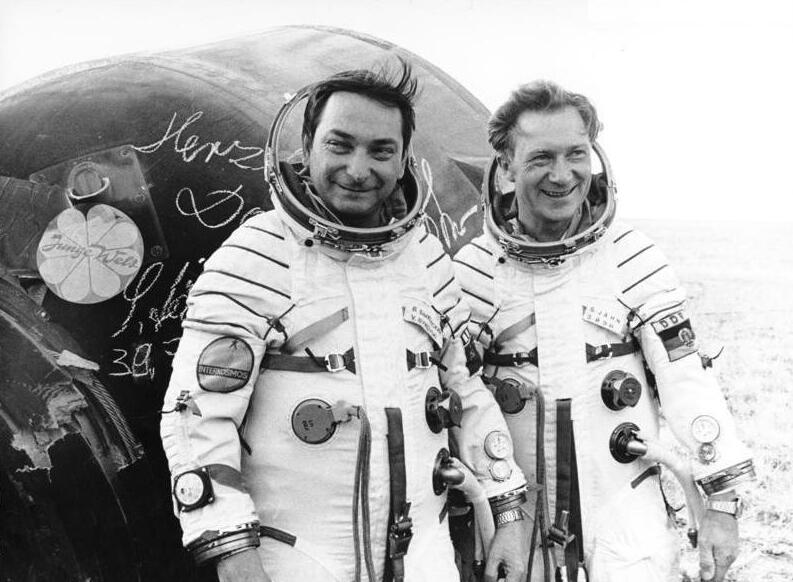
Valery Bykovsky and East German astronaut Sigmund Jähn after the Soyuz 31 mission

He flew the Soyuz 31 mission to the Salyut 6 space station with the East German Sigmund Jähn. It was launched on 26 August 1978. They joined two other cosmonauts on the space station that had arrived on Soyuz 29. The four conducted biological experiments on themselves during their stay. Bykovsky and Jähn undocked from the station in the Soyuz 29 capsule on 3 September and landed back on Earth later that day.

== Post-cosmonaut career ==
Much of his later career was devoted to promoting the Intercosmos programme amongst the world's socialist nations. Due to his age, he was moved from active duty to the reserves in 1988. He became the director of the Centre of Soviet Science and Culture in East Berlin after the Soyuz 31 mission. He retired sometime in 1990.

Valery Bykovsky established the Russian Federation of Cosmonautics (RFC) in 1998 with the objective of advancing the development of space exploration and science in Russia. The RFC's main goals included increasing public interest in space exploration, providing educational opportunities for young people, and supporting research and development initiatives in the space sector. Bykovsky was the president of the RFC until his death in 2019.

== Personal life ==
Bykovsky was a keen sportsman:

Service in the Air Force made us strong, both physically and morally. All of us cosmonauts took up sports and PT seriously when we served in the Air Force. I know that Yuri Gagarin was fond of ice hockey. He liked to play goal keeper. Gherman Titov was a gymnastics enthusiast, Andriyan Nikolayev liked skiing, Pavel Popovich went in for weight lifting. I don't think I am wrong when I say that sports became a fixture in the life of the cosmonauts.

Bykovsky was a proficient aesthete and photographer who evinced a particular penchant for the art of painting. His extensive body of work, characterized by a predominantly figurative style, has been widely showcased in renowned galleries and museums throughout Russia. Additionally, he had an abiding passion for photography and had taken numerous photographs during his space missions, using both conventional and digital cameras to capture stunning images of the Earth's surface and the celestial bodies.

He was married to Valentina Mikhailovna Sukhova; they had two sons. In 1986, his first son died in an aviation incident. Valery Bykovsky died on 27 March 2019.

== Honours and awards ==
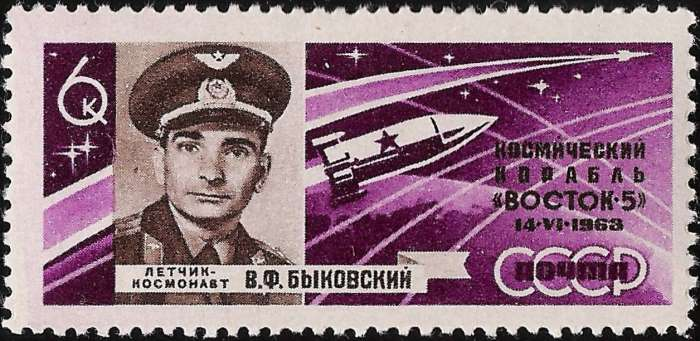
A 1963 Soviet postage stamp showing Valery Bykovsky and Vostok 5

- Twice Hero of the Soviet Union (22 June 1963 and 28 September 1976)
- Order of Lenin (1963, 1976, and 1978)
- Order of the Red Star (1961)
- Order of Friendship (12 April 2011)
- Order of the Red Banner of Labour (1976)
- Merited Master of Sports of the Soviet Union
- Pilot-Cosmonaut of the USSR (1963)
- Medal "For Development of the Virgin Lands" (1963)
- Hero of Socialist Labour (Bulgaria, 1963)
- Order of Georgi Dimitrov (Bulgaria, 1963)
- Hero of the German Democratic Republic (East Germany, 1978)
- Order of Karl Marx, twice (East Germany, 1976, 1978)
- Hero of Socialist Labour (Vietnam, 1963)
- Cross of Grunwald, 1st class (Poland, 1963)
- Star of the Republic of Indonesia, 2nd class (1963)
- Gold Medal. Tsiolkovsky Academy of Sciences
- FAI De La Vaulx Medal (1963)
