= List of items smuggled into space =

Multiple people have covertly snuck items on to space missions without the knowledge of their superiors. During the Gemini program, Deke Slayton issued a memo to all astronauts urging a halt to the practice: “… the attempt … to bootleg any item on board not approved by me will result in appropriate disciplinary action. In addition to jeopardizing your personal careers, it must be recognized that seemingly insignificant items can and have affected the prerogatives of follow-on crews." Despite this and other warnings, the practice continued. Here is a partial list of those items.

- On March 23, 1965, Gemini 3 astronauts Gus Grissom and John Young brought a corned beef sandwich into orbit, which was widely publicized in the media. They were reprimanded by NASA officials.
- On December 15, 1965, Walter Schirra discreetly brought a harmonica on board Gemini VI-A and played the song "Jingle Bells". The incident marked the first time that a musical instrument was ever played in space and the harmonica is now in the possession of the National Air and Space Museum.
- Schirra also reported bringing Scotch and cigarettes onto Gemini VI-A without permission.
- On January 31, 1971, Edgar Mitchell brought materials on Apollo 14 to conduct unauthorized experiments into extrasensory perception.
- On August 2, 1971, Apollo 15 commander David Scott placed a small metal statue on the Moon, named Fallen Astronaut to commemorate the astronauts and cosmonauts who had died in the advancement of space exploration.
- Soviet cosmonauts aboard Soyuz 29 in 1978 brought chocolates on board their flight, which scattered in orbit and required two hours to collect.
- In 2008 Richard Garriott claimed to have smuggled a small amount of James Doohan's ashes onto the ISS inside a number of laminated postcards. NASA declined to comment on the story.
- In 2019, American entrepreneur Nova Spivack sent tardigrades to the Moon on board an Arch Mission Foundation lander without informing the Israeli launch company SpaceIL that they were part of the payload.
