= Scharnhorst Order =

Award of the East German National People's Army

Scharnhorst Order Scharnhorst-Orden
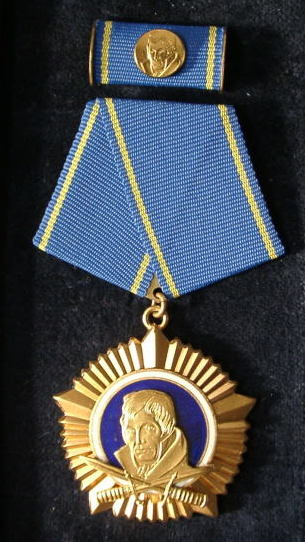
- The Scharnhorst-Order medal and ribbon bar
- Awarded for: Military services, contributions to the protection of the GDR, and strengthening the national defense of the GDR
- Presented by: East Germany
- Eligibility: Personnel of the National People's Army, Border Troops of the German Democratic Republic, Civil Defense of the DDR, Ministry of State Security, members of other institutions of the GDR, and foreign military personnel.
- Status: No longer awarded
- Established: 17 February 1966
- First award: 1 March 1966
- Ribbon bar

Precedence
- Next (higher): Banner of Labor
- Next (lower): Combat Order of Merit for the People and Fatherland

The Scharnhorst Order (German: Scharnhorst-Orden or German: Scharnhorstorden) was the highest medal awarded to members of the East German National People's Army (NVA). It was given for services to military or other strengthening of the German Democratic Republic (GDR). Established on 17 February 1966 by the Council of Ministers of the GDR, it was awarded until the dissolution of the GDR in 1990.

== Scharnhorst history ==
The medal commemorates the legacy of Gerhard Johann David von Scharnhorst (1755–1813), a soldier in Hanoverian and Prussian service, military theorist, reformer and German patriot. His military achievements included extensive combat experience and military writings wherein he emphasized the importance of the "General Staff" and their ability to work and plan war and battle strategy. GDR authorities regarded Scharnhorst as a progressive military theorist and advocate for reforms in the Prussian military system - all foundations on which the National People's Army was based.

== Design ==
Klaus Bernsdorf of Berlin designed the medal. The sculptor Fritz Schulz, also of Berlin, produced the portrait of Scharnhorst that appears on the medal.

== Award requirements ==
The order was given for outstanding:

- military services (primarily to generals and admirals)
- contributions to the protection of the GDR and
- strengthening the national defense of the GDR

To members, units, associations and other bodies (including civil facilities):

- The National People's Army (NVA) on the anniversary of the Army on 1 March of the year.
- The Border Troops of the German Democratic Republic (Grenztruppen - GT) on the anniversary of the GT on 1 December of the year.
- The Civil Defense of the GDR (ZV) the anniversary of the ZD on 11 February.
- The Ministry of State Security (Stasi), on the anniversary of the Stasi, 8 February of the year.

The Order was also presented to members of other institutions of the GDR who did not necessarily have to be involved in an armed organization. It was also presented to foreign military personnel, for example, to Marshal Viktor Georgiyevich Kulikov of the Soviet Union. The order was always presented with an elaborately crafted document along with a one-time cash prize of 5,000 Marks.

== Recipients ==
The medal was first awarded on 1 March 1966. There were two initial recipients of the award, which was presented by Walter Ulbricht. They were Army General Heinz Hoffmann and Admiral Waldemar Verner. Other recipients are:

- General Karl-Heinz Wagner
- Army General Heinz Kessler
- Willi Stoph
- Erich Mielke
- Colonel General Fritz Streletz
- Klaus-Dieter Baumgarten
- Major-General Leopold Gotthilf
- Generaloberst Erich Peter
- Ludwig Mecklinger

== Production ==
There are three versions of the Scharnhorst Order:

- 1st Version 1966-1972: Produced in 900 gold-plated silver, with 5 rivets on the obverse.
- 2nd Version 1973-1980: Produced in gilt non-ferrous metal, held to the medal with a central rivet on the obverse.
- 3rd Version 1980-1989: Introduction of a patterned smooth back with no rivets, medallion is glued on.

Accurate measurements are difficult because of different versions and use of materials over the years. The sizes, therefore, are based on averages. They were:

- Height, including eye: 45.45 mm to 46.37 mm
- Width: about 42.5 mm
- Total width of the daggers: about 30.2 mm
- Weight: 44g to 44.5 g

== Wear ==
The Scharnhorst Order was worn on the left breast suspended from a pentagonal ribbon in the Russian style. This medal could be issued to and worn several times by a single recipient. General Kessler, for example, received (and would wear) three Scharnhorst Orders.
