= Progress 4 =

Soviet unmanned Progress cargo spacecraft

- A Progress 7K-TG spacecraft
- Mission type: Salyut 6 resupply
- Operator: OKB-1
- COSPAR ID: 1978-090A
- SATCAT no.: 11040
- Mission duration: 23 days

Spacecraft properties
- Spacecraft: Progress s/n 105
- Spacecraft type: Progress 7K-TG
- Manufacturer: NPO Energia
- Launch mass: 7281 kg
- Dry mass: 7020 kg
- Payload mass: 2436 kg
- Dimensions: 7.48 m in length and 2.72 m in diameter

Start of mission
- Launch date: 3 October 1978, 23:09:30 UTC
- Rocket: Soyuz-U s/n Ye15000-152
- Launch site: Baikonur, 1/5
- Contractor: OKB-1

End of mission
- Disposal: Deorbited
- Decay date: 26 October 1978, 16:28 UTC

Orbital parameters
- Reference system: Geocentric
- Regime: Low Earth
- Perigee altitude: 191 km
- Apogee altitude: 266 km
- Inclination: 51.66°
- Period: 88.8 minutes
- Epoch: 3 October 1978

Docking with Salyut 6
- Docking port: Aft
- Docking date: 6 October 1978, 01:00:15 UTC
- Undocking date: 24 October 1978, 13:01:52 UTC
- Time docked: 18.5 days

Cargo
- Mass: 2436 kg
- Pressurised: 1230 kg
- Fuel: 705 kg
- Gaseous: 50 kg
- Water: 420 kg

Progress 4 (Russian: Прогресс 4), was a Progress cargo spacecraft launched by the Soviet Union in 1978 to resupply the Salyut 6 space station. It used the Progress 7K-TG configuration and was the fourth Progress mission to Salyut 6. It carried supplies aboard Salyut 6, as well as equipment for conducting scientific research, and fuel for adjusting the station's orbit and performing manoeuvres.

== Spacecraft ==
Progress 4 was a Progress 7K-TG spacecraft. The fourth of forty three to be launched, it had the serial number 105. The Progress 7K-TG spacecraft was the first generation Progress, derived from the Soyuz 7K-T and intended for uncrewed logistics missions to space stations in support of the Salyut programme. On some missions the spacecraft were also used to adjust the orbit of the space station.

The Progress spacecraft had a dry mass of 6,520 kilograms (14,370 lb), which increased to around 7,020 kilograms (15,480 lb) when fully fuelled. It measured 7.48 metres (24.5 ft) in length, and 2.72 metres (8 ft 11 in) in diameter. Each spacecraft could accommodate up to 2,500 kilograms (5,500 lb) of payload, consisting of dry cargo and propellant. The spacecraft were powered by chemical batteries, and could operate in free flight for up to three days, remaining docked to the station for up to thirty.

== Launch ==
Progress 4 launched on 3 October 1978 at 23:09:30 UTC (4 October at 4:09 a.m. local time) from the Baikonur Cosmodrome in the Kazakh Soviet Socialist Republic. It used a Soyuz-U rocket.

== Docking ==
Progress 4 docked with Salyut 6 on 6 October 1978 at 01:00:15 UTC.

== Decay ==
It remained in orbit until 26 October 1978, when it was deorbited. The deorbit burn occurred at 16:28 UTC.

== See also ==
- 1978 in spaceflight
- List of Progress missions
- List of uncrewed spaceflights to Salyut space stations
