= Eberhard Köllner =

East German cosmonaut

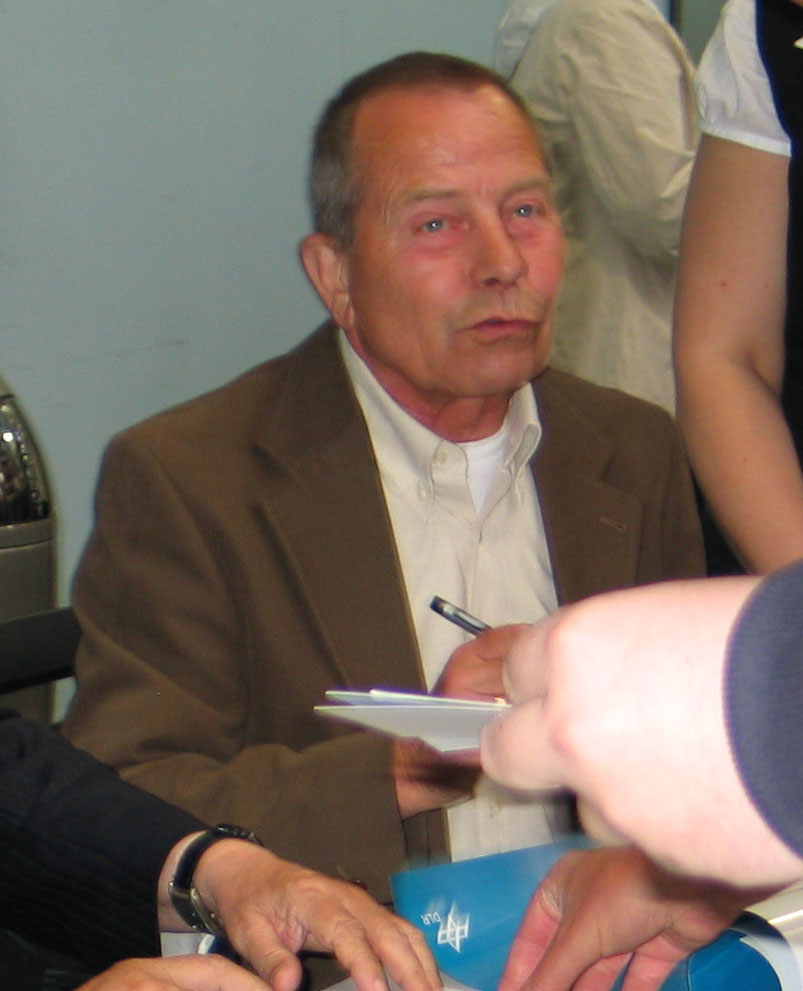
- Born: 29 September 1939 (age 87); Stassfurt, Germany
- Space career
- Missions: Soyuz 31 (backup)

Eberhard Köllner (born 29 September 1939 in Stassfurt, Germany) was selected for Soyuz 31 as the backup for Sigmund Jähn.

He later became the Director of the Airforce Academy of the German Democratic Republic in the rank of an Oberst ("Colonel"), following the reunion of Germany he refused to be transferred to the (West) German Bundeswehr. He is currently working in private industries.
