= Vladimir Kovalyonok =

Soviet cosmonaut (born 1942)

- Владимир Ковалёнок; Уладзімір Кавалёнак
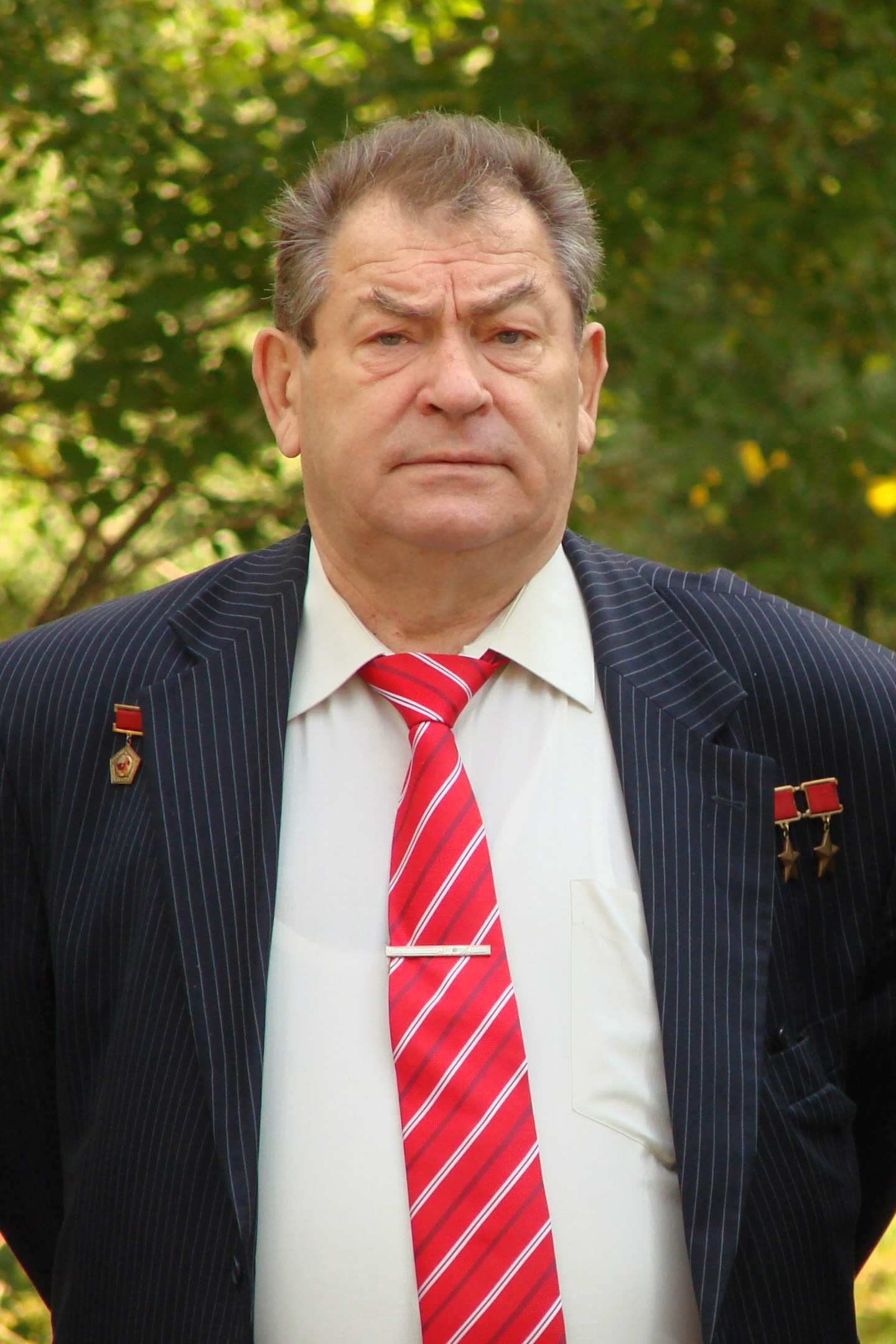
- Cosmonaut Vladimir Kovalyonok in Vologda
- Born: 3 March 1942 (age 84); Bielaye, Reichskommissariat Ostland (now Belarus)
- Occupation: Pilot-cosmonaut
- Awards: Hero of the Soviet Union (twice)
- Space career

Cosmonaut
- Status: Retired
- Rank: Colonel General, Soviet Air Force
- Time in space: 216d 09h 08m
- Selection: Air Force Group 4
- Missions: Soyuz 25 (failed docking with Salyut 6), Soyuz 29/Soyuz 31 (Salyut 6 EO-2), Soyuz T-4 (Salyut 6 EO-6)

Vladimir Vasiliyevich Kovalyonok (Belarusian: Уладзі́мір Васі́льевіч Кавалёнак; Russian: Влади́мир Васи́льевич Ковалёнок; born 3 March 1942) is a retired Soviet cosmonaut.

He entered the Soviet space programme on July 5, 1967, and was commander of three missions. Together with Aleksandr Ivanchenkov he flew the long-endurance mission EO-2 which set a new record of 139 days in space. He retired from the cosmonaut team on June 23, 1984.

From 1990 to 1992 he was a Director of the 30th Central Scientific Research Institute, Ministry of Defence (Russia).

== Missions ==
- Soyuz 25 (failed to dock to Salyut 6)
- Soyuz 29/Soyuz 31
- Soyuz T-4
  - All his missions were to the Salyut 6 space station

== Honours and awards ==
- Hero of the Soviet Union, twice (2 November 1978 and 26 May 1981)
- Pilot-Cosmonaut of the USSR
- Order of Merit for the Fatherland, 3rd class (16 May 1996)
- Order of Military Merit (2000)
- Three Orders of Lenin (15 November 1977, 2 November 1978 and 26 May 1981)
- Order for Service to the Homeland in the Armed Forces of the USSR, 3rd class (12 August 1991)
- Medal "For Merit in Space Exploration" (12 April 2011) - for great achievements in the field of research, development and use of outer space, many years of diligent work, public activities
- Hero of the German Democratic Republic (1978)
- Order of Karl Marx (East Germany, 1978)
- Hero of the MPR (Mongolia, 1981)
- Order of Sukhbaatar (Mongolia, 1981)
- Cross of Grunwald, 3rd class (Poland, 1978)
- Order for Service to the Homeland, 2nd class (Belarus, 2002)
