= Aleksandr Ivanchenkov =

Soviet cosmonaut (born 1940)

- Александр Иванченков
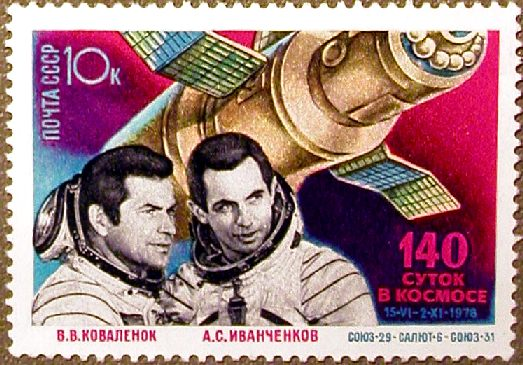
- Vladimir Kovalyonok and Aleksandr Ivanchenkov on the 1978 Soviet stamp "140 days in space"
- Born: 28 September 1940 (age 86); Ivanteyevka, USSR
- Occupation: Engineer
- Awards: Hero of the Soviet Union (2); Order of Lenin (2)
- Space career

Cosmonaut
- Status: Retired
- Time in space: 147d 12h 37m
- Selection: Civilian Specialist Group 5
- Total EVAs: 1
- Total EVA time: 2 hours 5 minutes
- Missions: Soyuz 29/Soyuz 31, Soyuz T-6

Aleksandr Sergeyevich Ivanchenkov (Russian: Алекса́ндр Серге́евич Иванче́нков; born 28 September 1940) is a retired Soviet cosmonaut who flew as Flight Engineer on Soyuz 29 and Soyuz T-6, he spent 147 days, 12 hours and 37 minutes in space.

Ivanchenkov first flew on Soyuz 29 in 1978 to the Salyut 6 space station. It was the fifth mission, the fourth successful docking, and the second long-duration crew for the orbiting station. Commander Vladimir Kovalyonok and flight engineer Ivanchenkov established a new space endurance record of 139 days.

Ivanchenkov flew for a second time in 1982 on the Soyuz T-6 mission to the Salyut 7 space station. Along with two Soviet cosmonauts, the crew included a Frenchman, Jean-Loup Chrétien.

== Biography ==
Ivanchenkov is married with one child. He was selected as a cosmonaut on 27 March 1973. He retired on 3 November 1993.

== Honours and awards ==
- Twice Hero of the Soviet Union;
- Pilot-Cosmonaut of the USSR;
- Two Orders of Lenin;
- Medal "For Merit in Space Exploration" (Russian Federation);
- Hero of the German Democratic Republic;
- Order of Karl Marx;
- Commander of the Legion of Honour (France);
- Cross of Grunwald 3rd class.

== See also ==
- Spaceflight records
