= List of Soviet human spaceflight missions =

This is a list of the human spaceflight missions conducted by the Soviet space program. These missions belong to the Vostok, Voskhod, and Soyuz space programs.

The first patch from the Soviet Space Program was worn by Valentina Tereshkova, then the same patch for the Voskhod 2, Soyuz 4/5 and Soyuz 11, Soyuz 3 had an official insignia that wasn't worn during the flight, and then in the Apollo–Soyuz program. After that and until Soyuz TM-12 "Juno" flight mission patches had been designed only for international missions.

== Vostok program ==
Mission	Patch	Launch	Duration	Landing	Pilot	Notes
Vostok 1		12 April 1961	1 h 48 m	12 April 1961	Yuri Gagarin	First man in space; first human orbital flight
Vostok 2		6 August 1961	1 d 1 h 18 m	7 August 1961	Gherman Titov	First full day in space
Vostok 3		11 August 1962	3 d 22 h 22 m	15 August 1962	Andriyan Nikolayev	First simultaneous flight of two crewed spacecraft
Vostok 4		12 August 1962	2 d 22 h 56 m	15 August 1962	Pavel Popovich	First simultaneous flight of two crewed spacecraft
Vostok 5		14 June 1963	4 d 23 h 7 m	19 June 1963	Valery Bykovsky	Joint mission with Vostok 6; longest solo orbital flight
Vostok 6		16 June 1963	2 d 22 h 50 m	19 June 1963	Valentina Tereshkova	Joint mission with Vostok 5; first woman in space

== Voskhod program ==
Mission	Patch	Launch	Duration	Landing	Crew			Notes
Voskhod 1		12 October 1964	1 d 0 h 17 m 3 s	13 October 1964	Vladimir Komarov	Konstantin Feoktistov	Boris Yegorov	First spacecraft to carry a multiperson crew.
Voskhod 2		18 March 1965	1 d 2 h 2 m 17 s	19 March 1965	Pavel Belyayev	Alexei Leonov		First walk in space.

== Soyuz program ==
=== First Soyuz missions to Salyut 1 (1967–1971) ===
Order	Mission	Patch	Launch	Duration	Landing	Crew			Notes
1	Soyuz 1		23 April 1967	1 d 2 h 47 m 52 s	24 April 1967	V. Komarov			Cosmonaut died in crash-landing.
2	Soyuz 3		26 October 1968	3 d 22 h 50 m 45 s	30 October 1968	G. Beregovoy			Rendezvous with uncrewed Soyuz 2, failed docking.
3	Soyuz 4		14 January 1969	2 d 23 h 20 m 47 s	17 January 1969	V. Shatalov	A. Yeliseyev landing	Ye. Khrunov landing	Docked with Soyuz 5. Crew transfer.
4	Soyuz 5		15 January 1969	3 d 0 h 54 m 15 s	18 January 1969	B. Volynov	A. Yeliseyev launch	Ye. Khrunov launch	Docked with Soyuz 4. Crew transfer.
5	Soyuz 6		11 October 1969	4 d 22 h 42 m 47 s	16 October 1969	G. Shonin	V. Kubasov		Joint mission with Soyuz 7 & 8.
6	Soyuz 7		12 October 1969	4 d 22 h 40 m 23 s	17 October 1969	A. Filipchenko	V. Volkov	V. Gorbatko	Joint mission with Soyuz 6 & 8.
7	Soyuz 8		13 October 1969	4 d 22 h 50 m 49 s	18 October 1969	V. Shatalov	A. Yeliseyev		Joint mission with Soyuz 6 & 7.
8	Soyuz 9		1 June 1970	17 d 16 h 58 m 55 s	19 June 1970	A. Nikolayev	V. Sevastyanov		Cosmonaut endurance test.
9	Soyuz 10		23 April 1971	1 d 23 h 44 m 54 s	25 April 1971	V. Shatalov	A. Yeliseyev	N. Rukavishnikov	Failed to dock with Salyut 1.
10	Soyuz 11		6 June 1971	23 d 18 h 21 m 43 s	30 June 1971	G. Dobrovolsky	V. Patsayev	V. Volkov	Visited Salyut 1. All cosmonauts aboard died in reentry from asphyxiation.

=== 1973–1977 ===
Mission	Order	Patch	Launch	Duration	Landing	Crew		Notes
11	Soyuz 12		27 September 1973	1 d 23 h 15 m 32 s	29 September 1973	V. Lazarev	O. Makarov	Test of redesigned two-person Soyuz craft.
12	Soyuz 13		18 December 1973	7 d 20 h 55 m 35 s	26 December 1973	V. Lebedev	P. Klimuk	Carried Orion 2 Space Observatory.
13	Soyuz 14		3 July 1974	15 d 17 h 30 m 28 s	19 July 1974	Yu. Artyukhin	P. Popovich	Visited Salyut 3.
14	Soyuz 15		26 August 1974	2 d 0 h 12 m 11 s	28 August 1974	L. Dyomin	G. Sarafanov	Failed to dock with Salyut 3.
15	Soyuz 16		2 December 1974	5 d 22 h 23 m 35 s	8 December 1974	A. Filipchenko	N. Rukavishnikov	Test of redesigned Soyuz craft.
16	Soyuz 17		11 January 1975	29 d 13 h 19 m 45 s	10 February 1975	G. Grechko	A. Gubarev	Visited Salyut 4 (1).
17	Soyuz 18a		5 April 1975	0 d 0 h 21 m 27 s	5 April 1975	V. Lazarev	O. Makarov	Launch failure, did not reach Salyut 4.
18	Soyuz 18		24 May 1975	62 d 23 h 20 m 8 s	26 July 1975	P. Klimuk	V. Sevastyanov	Visited Salyut 4 (2).
19	Soyuz 19		15 July 1975	5 d 22 h 31 m	21 July 1975	A. Leonov	V. Kubasov	Apollo-Soyuz Test Project: first docking with American spacecraft
20	Soyuz 21		6 July 1976	49 d 6 h 23 m 32 s	24 August 1976	B. Volynov	V. Zholobov	Visited Salyut 5 (1), departed early.
21	Soyuz 22		15 September 1976	7 d 21 h 52 m 17 s	23 September 1976	V. Bykovsky	V. Aksyonov	Earth imaging mission – as of 2021 last flight of a Soyuz spacecraft not targeted for a space station.
22	Soyuz 23		14 October 1976	2 d 0 h 6 m 35 s	16 October 1976	V. Zudov	V. Rozhdestvensky	Failed to dock with Salyut 5. Near-disastrous landing in icy lake.
23	Soyuz 24		7 February 1977	17 d 17 h 26 m 0 s	25 February 1977	V. Gorbatko	Yu. Glazkov	Visited Salyut 5 (2).

=== Salyut 6 to Salut 7 (1977–1986) ===
Order	Patch	Mission	Launch	Duration	Landing	Crew			Notes
24	Soyuz 25		9 October 1977	2 d 0 h 44 m 45 s	11 October 1977	V. Kovalyonok	V. Ryumin		Failed to dock with Salyut 6.
25	Soyuz 26		10 December 1977	37 d 10 h 6 m 18 s	16 January 1978	G. Grechko launch V. Dzhanibekov landing	Yu. Romanenko launch O. Makarov landing		Visited Salyut 6 (1); returned with crew of Soyuz 27.
26	Soyuz 27		10 January 1978	64 d 22 h 52 m 47 s	16 March 1978	V. Dzhanibekov launch G. Grechko landing	O. Makarov launch Yu. Romanenko landing		Visited Salyut 6 (2); returned with crew of Soyuz 26.
27	Soyuz 28		2 March 1978	7 d 22 h 17 m 0 s	10 March 1978	A. Gubarev	V. Remek		Visited Salyut 6 (3).
no Soviet space station occupied and crew in space
28	Soyuz 29		15 June 1978	79 d 15 h 23 m 0 s	3 September 1978	V. Kovalyonok launch V. Bykovsky landing	A. Ivanchenkov launch S. Jähn landing		Visited Salyut 6 (4); returned with crew of Soyuz 31.
29	Soyuz 30		27 June 1978	7 d 22 h 2 m 59 s	5 July 1978	P. Klimuk	M. Hermaszewski		Visited Salyut 6 (5).
30	Soyuz 31		26 August 1978	67 d 20 h 12 m 47 s	2 November 1978	V. Bykovsky launch V. Kovalyonok landing	S. Jähn launch A. Ivanchenkov landing		Visited Salyut 6 (6); returned with crew of Soyuz 29.
no Soviet space station occupied and crew in space
31	Soyuz 32		25 February 1979	108 d 4 h 24 m 37 s	13 June 1979	V. Lyakhov launch	V. Ryumin launch		Visited Salyut 6 (7). Vehicle returned without crew.
32	Soyuz 33		10 April 1979	1 d 23 h 1 m 6 s	12 April 1979	N. Rukavishnikov	G. Ivanov		Failed to dock with Salyut 6.
33	Soyuz 34		6 June 1979	73 d 18 h 16 m 45 s	19 August 1979	V. Lyakhov landing	V. Ryumin landing		Launched uncrewed to Salyut 6, returned with crew of Soyuz 32.
no Soviet space station occupied and crew in space
34	Soyuz 35		9 April 1980	55 d 1 h 28 m 1 s	3 June 1980	L. Popov launch V. Kubasov landing	V. Ryumin launch B. Farkas landing		Visited Salyut 6 (8); returned with crew of Soyuz 36.
35	Soyuz 36		26 May 1980	65 d 20 h 54 m 23 s	31 July 1980	V. Kubasov launch V. Gorbatko landing	B. Farkas launch T. Phạm landing		Visited Salyut 6 (9); returned crew of Soyuz 37.
36	Soyuz T-2		5 June 1980	3 d 22 h 19 m 30 s	9 June 1980	V. Aksyonov	Yu. Malyshev		Visited Salyut 6 (10); test of new model Soyuz spacecraft.
37	Soyuz 37		23 July 1980	79 d 15 h 16 m 54 s	11 October 1980	V. Gorbatko launch L. Popov landing	T. Phạm launch V. Ryumin landing		Visited Salyut 6 (11); returned crew of Soyuz 35.
38	Soyuz 38		18 September 1980	7 d 20 h 43 m 24 s	26 September 1980	Yu. Romanenko	A. Tamayo		Visited Salyut 6 (12).
no Soviet space station occupied and crew in space
39		Soyuz T-3	27 November 1980	12 d 19 h 7 m 42 s	10 December 1980	L. Kizim	O. Makarov	G. Strekalov	Visited Salyut 6 (13). Test of first 3-seat Soyuz since 1971.
no Soviet space station occupied and crew in space
40		Soyuz T-4	12 March 1981	74 d 17 h 37 m 23 s	26 May 1981	V. Kovalyonok	V. Savinykh		Visited Salyut 6 (14).
41		Soyuz 39	22 March 1981	7 d 20 h 42 m 3 s	30 March 1981	V. Dzhanibekov	Jügderdemidiin Gürragchaa		Visited Salyut 6 (15).
42		Soyuz 40	14 May 1981	7 d 20 h 41 m 52 s	22 May 1981	L. Popov	D. Prunariu		Visited Salyut 6 (16).
no Soviet space station occupied and crew in space
43		Soyuz T-5	13 May 1982	106 d 5 h 6 m 11 s	27 August 1982	A. Berezovoy launch L. Popov landing	V. Lebedev launch A. Serebrov landing	S. Savitskaya landing	Visited Salyut 7 (1). Returned crew of Soyuz T-7.
44		Soyuz T-6	24 June 1982	7 d 21 h 50 m 52 s	2 July 1982	V. Dzhanibekov	A. Ivanchenkov	J.-L. Chrétien	Visited Salyut 7 (2).
45		Soyuz T-7	19 August 1982	113 d 1 h 50 m 44 s	10 December 1982	L. Popov launch A. Berezovoy landing	A. Serebrov launch V. Lebedev landing	S. Savitskaya launch	Visited Salyut 7 (3), returned crew of Soyuz T-5. Second woman in space.
no Soviet space station occupied and crew in space
46		Soyuz T-8	20 April 1983	2 d 0 h 17 m 48 s	22 April 1983	V. Titov	G. Strekalov	A. Serebrov	Failed to dock with Salyut 7.
no Soviet space station occupied and crew in space
47		Soyuz T-9	27 June 1983	149 d 10 h 45 m 0 s	23 November 1983	V. Lyakhov	A. Aleksandrov		Visited Salyut 7 (4).
48		Soyuz T-10-1	26 September 1983	5 m 13 s	26 September 1983	V. Titov	G. Strekalov		Rocket exploded before launch; crew capsule removed by escape system.
no Soviet space station occupied and crew in space
49		Soyuz T-10	8 February 1984	62 d 22 h 41 m 22 s	11 April 1984	L. Kizim launch Yu. Malyshev landing	V. Solovyov launch G. Strekalov landing	O. Atkov launch R. Sharma landing	Visited Salyut 7 (5). Returned crew of Soyuz T-11.
50		Soyuz T-11	3 April 1984	181 d 21 h 48 m 0 s	2 October 1984	Yu. Malyshev launch L. Kizim landing	G. Strekalov launch V. Solovyov landing	R. Sharma launch O. Atkov landing	Visited Salyut 7 (6). Returned crew of Soyuz T-10.
51		Soyuz T-12	17 July 1984	11 d 19 h 14 m 36 s	29 July 1984	V. Dzhanibekov	S. Savitskaya	I. Volk	Visited Salyut 7 (7).
no Soviet space station occupied and crew in space
52		Soyuz T-13	6 June 1985	112 d 3 h 12 m 0 s	26 September 1985	V. Dzhanibekov	V. Savinykh launch G. Grechko landing		Visited and reactivated Salyut 7 (8). Exchanged crew member with Soyuz T-14.
53		Soyuz T-14	17 September 1985	64 d 21 h 52 m 8 s	21 November 1985	V. Vasyutin	A. Volkov	G. Grechko launch V. Savinykh landing	Visited Salyut 7 (9). Exchanged crew member with Soyuz T-13. Mission ended early due to Vasyutin's illness.
no Soviet space station occupied and crew in space
54		Soyuz T-15	13 March 1986	125 d 0 h 0 m 56 s	16 July 1986	L. Kizim	V. Solovyov		Visited Mir (1) and Salyut 7 (10).
no Soviet space station occupied and crew in space

=== Crewed Soyuz-TM Mir missions (1987–1991) ===
Order	Patch	Mission	Launch	Duration	Landing	Crew			Notes
55		Soyuz TM-2	5 February 1987	174 d 3 h 25 m 56 s	30 July 1987	Yu. Romanenko launch A. Viktorenko landing	A. Laveykin	M. Faris landing	Visited Mir (2). Returned crew from Soyuz TM-3.
56		Soyuz TM-3	22 July 1987	160 d 7 h 25 m 56 s	29 December 1987	A. Viktorenko launch Yu. Romanenko landing	A. Aleksandrov	M. Faris launch A. Levchenko landing	Visited Mir (3). Returned crew from Soyuz TM-2 and TM-4.
57		Soyuz TM-4	21 December 1987	178 d 22 h 54 m 29 s	17 June 1988	V. Titov launch A. Solovyev landing	M. Manarov launch V. Savinykh landing	A. Levchenko launch A. Aleksandrov landing	Visited Mir (4). Returned crew from Soyuz TM-5.
58		Soyuz TM-5	7 June 1988	91 d 10 h 46 m 25 s	7 September 1988	A. Solovyev launch V. Lyakhov landing	V. Savinykh launch	A. Aleksandrov launch A. Mohmand landing	Visited Mir (5). Returned crew from Soyuz TM-6. Difficulties with rocket firing to leave orbit.
59		Soyuz TM-6	29 August 1988	114 d 5 h 33 m 49 s	21 December 1988	V. Lyakhov launch V. Titov landing	V. Polyakov launch M. Manarov landing	A. Mohmand launch J.-L. Chrétien landing	Visited Mir (6). Returned crew from Soyuz TM-4 and TM-7
60		Soyuz TM-7	26 November 1988	151 d 11 h 8 m 24 s	27 April 1989	A. Volkov	S. Krikalev	J.-L. Chrétien launch V. Polyakov landing	Visited Mir (7). Returned cosmonaut from Soyuz TM-6.
no Soviet space station occupied and crew in space
61		Soyuz TM-8	5 September 1989	166 d 6 h 58 m 15 s	19 February 1990	A. Viktorenko	A. Serebrov		Visited Mir (8).
62		Soyuz TM-9	11 February 1990	179 d 1 h 17 m 57 s	9 August 1990	A. Solovyev	A. Balandin		Visited Mir (9).
63		Soyuz TM-10	1 August 1990	130 d 20 h 35 m 51 s	10 December 1990	G. Manakov	G. Strekalov	T. Akiyama^{1} landing	Visited Mir (10). Returned cosmonaut from Soyuz TM-11.
64		Soyuz TM-11	2 December 1990	175 d 1 h 50 m 41 s	26 May 1991	V. Afanasyev	M. Manarov	T. Akiyama^{1} launch H. Sharman^{1} landing	Visited Mir (11). Returned cosmonaut from Soyuz TM-12.
65		Soyuz TM-12	18 May 1991	144 d 15 h 21 m 50 s	10 October 1991	A. Artsebarsky	S. Krikalev launch T. Aubakirov landing	H. Sharman^{1} launch F. Viehböck landing	Visited Mir (12). Returned crew from Soyuz TM-13.
66		Soyuz TM-13	2 October 1991	175 d 2 h 51 m 44 s	25 March 1992	A. Volkov	T. Aubakirov launch S. Krikalev landing	F. Viehböck launch K.-D. Flade landing	Visited Mir (13). Returned cosmonaut from Soyuz TM-14. The Soviet Union had dissolved by the time the craft returned to earth.

For subsequent Soyuz missions conducted by the Russian Federal Space Agency, see List of Russian human spaceflight missions.

=== Notes ===
^{1} Commercially funded cosmonaut or other "spaceflight participant".

== See also ==
- List of Progress flights, with all flights of the Progress resupply craft that is based on the Soyuz spacecraft
