= Soyuz 35 =

1980 Soviet crewed spaceflight to Salyut 6

- Operator: Soviet space program
- COSPAR ID: 1980-027A
- SATCAT no.: 11753
- Mission duration: Capsule: 55 days, 1 hour and 28 minutes Original crew: 184 days, 20 hours, 11 minutes

Spacecraft properties
- Spacecraft type: Soyuz 7K-T
- Manufacturer: NPO Energia
- Launch mass: 6,800 kg (15,000 lb)

Crew
- Crew size: 2
- Launching: Leonid Popov; Valery Ryumin
- Landing: Valery Kubasov; Bertalan Farkas
- Callsign: Днепр (Dnepr – Dnieper)

Start of mission
- Launch date: April 9, 1980, 13:38:22 UTC
- Rocket: Soyuz-U
- Launch site: Baikonur 31/6

End of mission
- Landing date: June 3, 1980, 15:06:23 UTC
- Landing site: 180 km (110 mi) SE of Dzhezkazgan

Orbital parameters
- Reference system: Geocentric
- Regime: Low Earth
- Perigee altitude: 198 km (123 mi)
- Apogee altitude: 259.7 km (161.4 mi)
- Inclination: 51.65 degrees
- Period: 88.81 minutes

Docking with Salyut 6
- Docking port: Front
- Docking date: April 10, 1980, 15:15:32 UTC
- Undocking date: June 3, 1980, 11:50 UTC
- Time docked: 53 days, 20 hours and 34 minutes
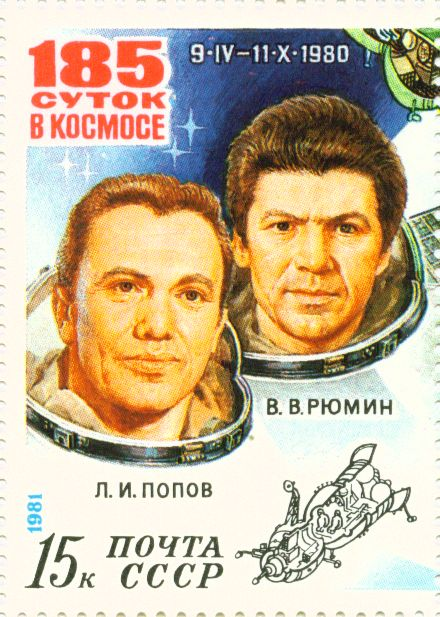
- Soviet stamp featuring Popov and Ryumin (1981) Soyuz programme

Soyuz 35 (Russian: Союз 35, Union 35) was a 1980 Soviet crewed space flight to the Salyut 6 space station. It was the 10th mission to and eighth successful docking at the orbiting facility. The Soyuz 35 crew were the fourth long-duration crew to man the space station.

Cosmonauts Leonid Popov and Valery Ryumin spent 185 days in space, setting a new space endurance record. Ryumin had completed a previous mission only eight months before. They hosted four visiting crews, including the first Hungarian, Cuban and Vietnamese cosmonauts.

As long-duration crews now routinely swapped spacecraft with incoming crew, the Soyuz 35 craft was used to return the visiting Soyuz 36 crew to Earth, while the resident crew returned in Soyuz 37.

== Crew ==
Prime crew
Position	Launching cosmonaut	Landing cosmonaut
Commander	Leonid Popov; First spaceflight	Valery Kubasov; Third spaceflight
Flight engineer/research cosmonaut	Valery Ryumin; Third spaceflight	Bertalan Farkas, Interkosmos; First spaceflight Research cosmonaut

Backup crew
Position	Cosmonaut
Commander	Vyacheslav Zudov
Flight engineer	Boris Andreyev

== Mission parameters ==
- Mass: 6,800 kg (15,000 lb)
- Perigee: 198 km (123 mi)
- Apogee: 259.7 km (161.4 mi)
- Inclination: 51.65°
- Period: 88.81 minutes

== Crew launch, station activation ==
Soyuz 35 was launched 9 April 1980 with Leonid Popov and Valery Ryumin aboard for a planned rendezvous with the orbiting Salyut 6 space station. The launch followed increased recent activity with the uncrewed space station. An uncrewed test craft, Soyuz T-1, spent several months docked to the station until it was undocked 23 March and deorbited 25 March. Progress 8, an uncrewed supply tanker, was launched almost immediately afterwards, on 27 March, and it docked with the rear dock port of the two-dock facility. Several manoeuvres were carried out by 2 April using the Progress to adjust the station's orbit.

Valentin Lebedev had been scheduled to be Popov's flight engineer, but he was disqualified from launch after suffering a knee injury in a trampoline accident. As none of the back-up crew had previous flight experience (required since the failure of the Soyuz 25 mission), Ryumin had been given the choice of replacing Lebedev or delaying the mission. This despite having completed a six-month mission only the previous August. Ryumin's family was upset by this turn of events.

The Soyuz 35 crew docked with and entered the space station on 10 April, using the vacant front port. Ryumin read the traditional note left by the previous crew, a note he had written with no expectation he would be the one receiving it. With Salyut 6 now entering its fourth year in orbit, some signs of wear and tear were becoming evident. Ryumin noted that the two viewports in the transfer compartment had lost their transparency. The windows also had many chips in them caused by micrometeoroids and orbital debris. The cosmonauts replaced components of the attitude control system and life support system, installed a new caution and warning system, synchronized the station's clocks with those in the TsUP Mission Control Center, added an 80 kilograms (180 lb) storage battery, and used Progress 8 to refill the life support system's oxygen and nitrogen tanks.

On 15 April, Progress 8's mission was completed. The crew loaded it with garbage, after which it was undocked and deorbited three days later. Then Progress 9 was launched, docking with the facility on 29 April. The next day, the first-ever transfer of water between a tanker and a Salyut station was completed. Cargo transfers and refuelling operations were completed by 12 May. With this flight, the resupply of the Salyut was complete for the long-duration crew.

Minor repair work was carried out by the crew and "Lotos" was carried out, an experiment involving using special moulds to make plastic items with a quick-setting material. Additional experiments involved production of polyurethane foam, exploring its utility in assembling structures in orbit.

== Soyuz 36 and Soyuz T-2 crews visit ==
Progress 9 was undocked 20 May, leaving the rear port vacant for the arrival of the next crew. Soyuz 36 was launched 26 May with Valery Kubasov and Hungarian cosmonaut Bertalan Farkas. The flight was originally scheduled for 5 June 1979, but was cancelled due to the Soyuz 33 failure. The launch was a part of the Soviet Intercosmos program whereby guest cosmonauts from allied nations would visit the space station, typically for about a week. Upon boarding, the visiting crew carried out some Hungarian experiments, including one measuring radiation doses received by the crew and another studying the formation of interferon in human cells under weightless conditions.

Kubasov and Farkas returned to Earth in Soyuz 35, leaving the resident crew with the fresh Soyuz 36, which they then flew around to the front port of Salyut 6, a maneuver taking about 90 minutes. The rapid switch of ferry vehicles, along with the launch of Soyuz 36 at almost the earliest possible date to allow a crew recovery in the nominal window, caused observers to speculate the secretive Soviets were possibly planning a second Intercosmos mission to recoup the time lost after the Soyuz 33 failure. A launch indeed was soon in the offing, but not the predicted mission.

Soyuz T-2 was launched 5 June with Yury Malyshev and Vladimir Aksyonov on what turned out to be the first crewed mission of the new Soyuz T variant. The craft docked at Salyut 6's rear port the next day. As they were merely testing the Soyuz, the mission lasted just two days after which they departed and returned to Earth.

The resident crew carried out repairs of the station's Kaskad attitude control system and performed materials processing experiments. On 1 July, Popov and Ryumin received Progress 10 at the station. Replacement equipment was unloaded from the supply tanker, as were regular crew supplies. Supplies included a Polaroid camera, a color television monitor, and tapes of Soviet pop music. The tanker was undocked from the complex on 17 July after refuelling the station and deorbited 19 July. Also on July 19, Popov and Ryumin sent their greetings from the station to the 1980 Summer Olympics, wishing the athletes happy starts in a live communication between the station and the Central Lenin Stadium where the opening ceremony was held. They appeared on the stadium's scoreboard and their voices were translated via loud speakers.

== First Asian and Cuban cosmonauts, end of mission ==
Observers anticipated a Cuban Intercosmos mission for the approaching launch window, but were proven wrong when the first Asian cosmonaut, Pham Tuan of Vietnam, was launched aboard Soyuz 37 with Viktor Gorbatko on 23 July. The launch was timed to take advantage of the world's focus on the Soviet Union during the Olympic games. The visiting crew swapped craft and left on the docked Soyuz 36 craft, returning to Earth on 31 July.

Pham Tuan's flight also had political implications as he was a decorated flying ace from the Vietnam War and had shot down several American aircraft, a fact that the Soviet media readily pointed out. The mission was interpreted as a subtle means of retaliation against the United States for boycotting the Olympics.

The following day, Popov and Ryumin boarded Soyuz 37 and redocked it to the front port, suggesting to observers that another crew's launch was coming shortly. That was not to occur, nor was another Progress supply tanker soon launched. The crew performed a joint experiment with scientists on the ground, using their Yelena-F gamma ray telescope. The experiment was designed to compare measurements with another telescope on the ground, but the weather balloon the experiment was using malfunctioned and thieves stole much of the equipment before ground crews could locate it.

The next landing window was now 2–15 October, suggesting the anticipated Cuban launch would be 24 September, but observers were caught off guard once again when Soyuz 38 was launched 18 September, almost a week earlier than anticipated.

Cuban Arnaldo Tamayo Méndez, the first space-farer of African descent, was accompanied by Yuri Romanenko into space, the fourth crew to visit the resident crew. The early launch date was intended to allow Cubans to be able to see their countryman overhead. Twenty-seven material processing and medical experiments were carried out by the visiting crew. As the Soyuz 35 crew were returning to Earth soon, the Soyuz 38 crew didn't swap their craft when they returned on 26 September.

The launch, therefore, of Progress 11 on 28 September came as surprise to observers, as it was assumed cosmonauts due to return to Earth would not need fresh supplies. Indeed, by the time the Soyuz 35 crew returned on 11 October, the Progress was only partially unloaded. In fact the real purpose of Progress 11 was to boost Salyut 6 into a higher orbit during the six months between crew residencies, since its defective propulsion system could no longer be used. The crew set a new space endurance mark of 185 days, but the record was not recognized by the IAF as it had not exceeded the previous 175-day record by the required minimum of 10 per cent. Ryumin had become by far the most experienced space-farer to that date, with a total of 352 days spent in space over three missions. Unusually, the crew had gained an average of 2 kg during the flight. This was explained by the crew's strict adherence to exercises and diet. By the day after landing, they were able to walk for half an hour. By 15 October, they were playing tennis. Thousands of Earth resources photographs were taken, as were more than 40,000 spectrograms. The fourth Salyut 6 residency was at last a complete success after the numerous technical malfunctions that dogged the first three crews.
