= Soyuz T-2 =

1980 Soviet crewed spaceflight to Salyut 6

- COSPAR ID: 1980-045A
- SATCAT no.: 11825
- Mission duration: 3 days, 22 hours, 19 minutes, 30 seconds
- Orbits completed: 62

Spacecraft properties
- Spacecraft type: Soyuz-T
- Manufacturer: NPO Energia

Crew
- Crew size: 2
- Members: Yury Malyshev; Vladimir Aksyonov
- Callsign: Юпитер (Yupiter - "Jupiter")

Start of mission
- Launch date: June 5, 1980, 14:19:30 UTC
- Rocket: Soyuz-U
- Launch site: Baikonur 1/5

End of mission
- Landing date: June 9, 1980, 12:39:00 UTC
- Landing site: 200 kilometres (120 mi) SE of Dzhezkazgan

Orbital parameters
- Reference system: Geocentric
- Regime: Low Earth
- Perigee altitude: 202 kilometres (126 mi)
- Apogee altitude: 249 kilometres (155 mi)
- Inclination: 51.6 degrees
- Period: 88.7 minutes

Docking with Salyut 6
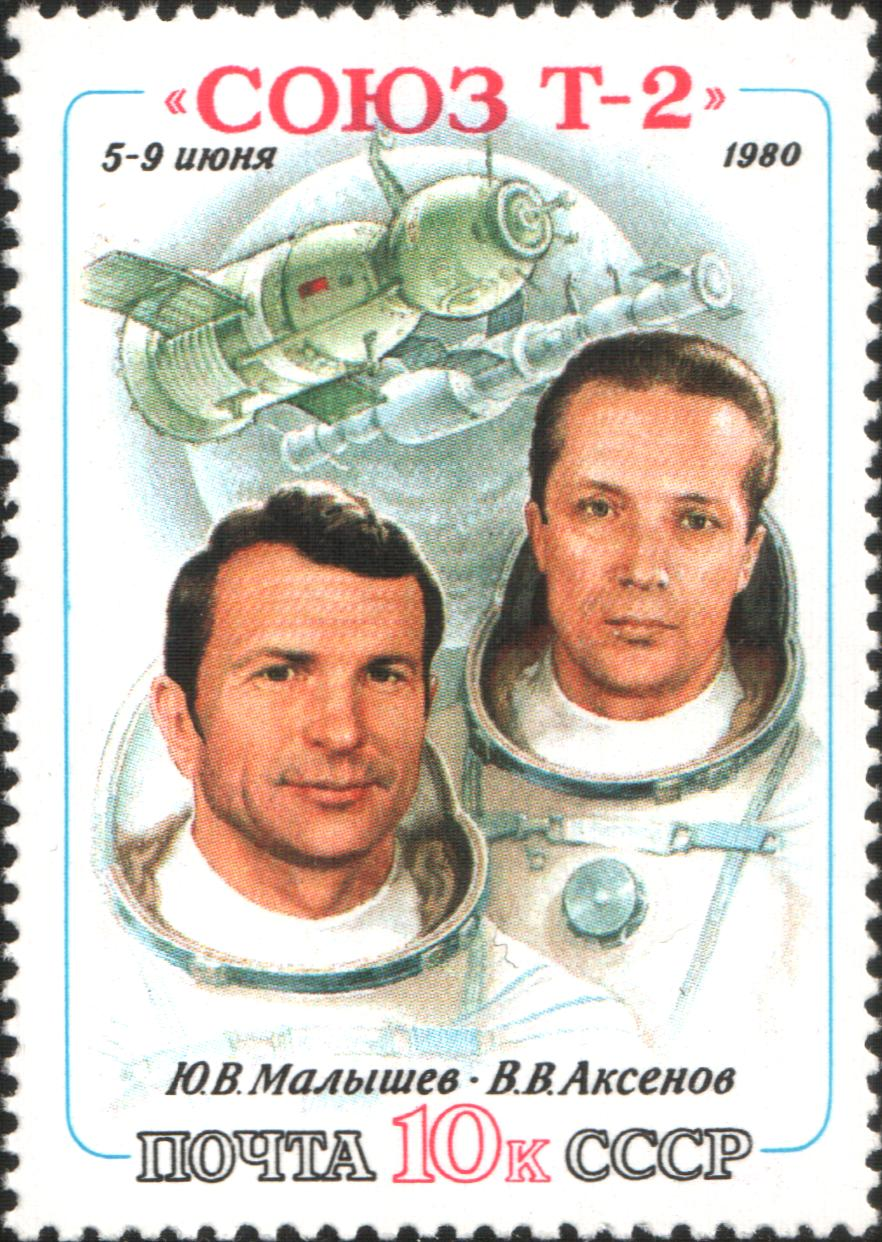
- Soyuz programme (Crewed missions)

Soyuz T-2 (Russian: Союз T-2, Union T-2) was a 1980 Soviet crewed space flight to the Salyut 6 space station. It was the 12th mission to and 10th successful docking at the orbiting facility. The Soyuz T-2 crew were the second to visit the long-duration Soyuz 35 resident crew.

Soyuz T-2 carried Yury Malyshev and Vladimir Aksyonov into space. A mission lasting under four days, its primary purpose was to perform a crewed test of the new Soyuz-T spacecraft.

== Crew ==
Position	Crew
Commander	Yury Malyshev; First spaceflight
Flight engineer	Vladimir Aksyonov; Second and last spaceflight

=== Backup crew ===
Position	Crew
Commander	Leonid Kizim
Flight engineer	Oleg Makarov

== Mission highlights ==
When the visiting Soyuz 36 Intercosmos crew departed Salyut 6 on 3 June 1980 and the remaining resident crew almost immediately redocked the Soyuz craft left behind, observers speculated the secretive Soviets were possibly planning a second Intercosmos mission. The failure of Soyuz 33 the year before had forced the Soviets to juggle their launch schedule.

A launch indeed was soon in the offing, but not the predicted mission. Soyuz T-2 was launched 5 June with Yury Malyshev and Vladimir Aksyonov on what turned out to be the first crewed mission of the new Soyuz T variant. The craft had new engine systems and could launch three cosmonauts. Additionally, the Soyuz was equipped with a new Argon computer which controlled docking and reentry procedures.

As the craft approached Salyut 6, solar cells, re-introduced to the Soyuz, were tested. The approach was completed automatically, while the final 180 metres were achieved manually on 6 June. The Argon docking computer had failed, leaving the craft perpendicular to the station. The computer failure was later explained as being caused by the crew and controllers failing to have practiced the particular approach the computer chose. The crew had therefore chosen to dock manually to be safe; the computer would have successfully docked if allowed to, said the Soviets. However, failures during the automatic approach was a recurring problem in future Soyuz T missions.

During their short stay, Malyshev and Aksyonov seemed to have carried out a minimum of experiments, including participating in some medical tests and using the Salyut's MKF-6M camera. They undocked in the craft they arrived on only two days after first greeting the resident crew. As they left, the Salyut turned around and the Soyuz T-2 crew photographed and visually inspected the space station. The Soyuz then departed and landed about three hours later.

== See also ==
- List of human spaceflights to Salyut space stations
- List of Salyut expeditions
