= Soyuz T-1 =

1979 Soviet test spaceflight to Salyut 6

- Mission type: Test flight
- COSPAR ID: 1979-103A
- SATCAT no.: 11640
- Mission duration: 3 months and 9 days

Spacecraft properties
- Spacecraft type: Soyuz-T
- Manufacturer: NPO Energia
- Launch mass: 6,450 kilograms (14,220 lb)

Start of mission
- Launch date: 16 December 1979, 12:30 UTC
- Rocket: Soyuz-U
- Launch site: Baikonur 1/5

End of mission
- Landing date: 25 March 1980, 21:47 UTC

Orbital parameters
- Reference system: Geocentric
- Regime: Low Earth

Docking with Salyut 6

Soyuz T-1 (Russian: Союз Т-1, also called Soyuz T) was a 1979-80 uncrewed Soviet space flight, a test flight of a new Soyuz craft which docked with the orbiting Salyut 6 space station.

== Mission parameters ==
- Spacecraft: Soyuz 7K-ST
- Mass: 6450 kg
- Crew: None
- Launched: 16 December 1979
- Landed: 25 March 1980

== Mission highlights ==
Four months had passed since the last Salyut 6 crew (Soyuz 32) had landed, and since the same amount of time had passed between the previous space station's long-duration crews, a December 1979 launch was considered a real possibility by observers. However, though the secretive Soviets did launch a craft that month, it was not what observers expected.

Soyuz T-1 was launched 16 December, and was the fourth uncrewed test flight of a modified version of the Soyuz spacecraft, the first to be given a "Soyuz" designation. Two days later, it approached the space station, but overshot it. A second dock attempt was made 19 December, and Soyuz T-1 successfully docked at the forward port.

The Soyuz lifted the orbit of the space station on 25 December and remained docked to it for 95 days, during which time the station remained unoccupied. It undocked on 23 March 1980, performed several days of tests, then was de-orbited 25 March. The landing date was outside a normal landing window as the craft was being flight-rated over the standard 2 1/2 months and the Soviets were planning to launch Soyuz 35 during the next launch window in April.

The mission was unusual for several reasons. Unlike other previous long uncrewed missions, Soyuz T-1 was not powered down while docked to the space station. And, its recovery saw a change from the norm as well. Previous Soyuz missions saw the entire spacecraft de-orbit. But with the Soyuz T craft, the orbital module was separated prior to retro-fire, to save propellant. This allowed for more maneuvers prior to de-orbit.
