= Salyut 6 =

Soviet space station (1977–1982)

- Salyut 6 with docked Soyuz and Progress.

- Salyut programme logo

Station statistics
- COSPAR ID: 1977-097A
- SATCAT no.: 10382
- Call sign: Salyut 6
- Crew: 3
- Launch: 29 September 1977, 06:50:00 UTC
- Launch pad: Baikonur, Site 81/24
- Reentry: 29 July 1982
- Mass: 19,824 kg (43,704 lb)
- Length: 15.8 m (52 ft)
- Diameter: 4.15 m (13.6 ft)
- Pressurised volume: 90 m^{3} (3,200 cu ft)
- Periapsis altitude: 219 km (136 mi)
- Apoapsis altitude: 275 km (171 mi)
- Orbital inclination: 51.66°
- Orbital period: 89.1 minutes
- Orbits per day: 16.16
- Days in orbit: 1,764
- Days occupied: 683
- No. of orbits: 28,024
- Distance travelled: ~1,136,861,930 km (706,413,250 mi)
- Statistics as of deorbit on 29 July 1982; References
- Configuration
- Basic orbital configuration of Salyut 6

Salyut 6 (Russian: Салют 6, lit. 'Salute 6') was a Soviet orbital space station, the eighth station of the Salyut programme, and alternatively known DOS-5 as it was the fifth of the Durable Orbital Station series of civilian space stations. It was launched on 29 September 1977 by a Proton-K rocket. Salyut 6 was the first space station to receive large numbers of crewed and uncrewed spacecraft for human habitation, crew transfer, international participation and resupply, establishing precedents for station life and operations which were enhanced on Mir and the International Space Station.

Salyut 6 was the first "second generation" space station, representing a major breakthrough in capabilities and operational success. In addition to a new propulsion system and its primary scientific instrument—the BST-1M multispectral telescope—the station had two docking ports, allowing two craft to visit simultaneously. This feature made it possible for humans to remain aboard for several months. Six long-term resident crews were supported by ten short-term visiting crews who typically arrived in newer Soyuz craft and departed in older craft, leaving the newer craft available to the resident crew as a return vehicle, thereby extending the resident crew's stay past the design life of the Soyuz. Short-term visiting crews routinely included international cosmonauts from Warsaw Pact countries participating in the Soviet Union's Intercosmos programme. These cosmonauts were the first spacefarers from countries other than the Soviet Union or the United States. Salyut 6 was visited and resupplied by twelve uncrewed Progress spacecraft including Progress 1, the first instance of the series. Additionally, Salyut 6 was visited by the first instances of the new Soyuz-T spacecraft.

The success of Salyut 6 contrasted with the programme's earlier failures and limited successes. The early history of the programme was plagued by the fatalities of Soyuz 11 and three launched stations which quickly failed. Earlier successful stations received few crews, limited to several weeks' habitation by the design life of their Soyuz craft and the presence of a single docking port per station; unsuccessful docking was also common. Salyut 6 on the other hand routinely received successful dockings of crewed and uncrewed craft, although the first visiting craft Soyuz 25 and later Soyuz 33 failed to dock with the station.

From 1977 to 1981, the station was occupied by human crews during six separate, discontinuous intervals, each coterminous with the presence of a resident crew who were first-in, last-out while support crew visited. Between each of these intervals Salyut 6 was vacant, although it was visited by Soyuz T-1 and Kosmos 1267 during its periods of vacancy. Following the launch of successor Salyut 7, Salyut 6 was de-orbited on 29 July 1982, almost five years after its own launch.

== Description ==
Salyut 6, launched on a Proton-K rocket on 29 September 1977, marked the switch from engineering development stations to routine operations, and united the most effective elements from each of the previous stations. Its navigation system, made up of the Delta semi-automatic computer to depict the station's orbit and the Kaskad system to control its orientation, was based on that used on Salyut 4, as was its power system, which consisted of a trio of steerable solar panels, together producing a peak of 4 kilowatts of power over 51 m^{2}. The station's thermal regulation systems, which made use of a sophisticated arrangement of insulation and radiators, was also derived from that used on Salyut 4. In addition, Salyut 6 made use of environmental systems first used on Salyut 3, and controlled its orientation using gyrodynes first tested on that station.

Salyut 6 with Progress (P) and Soyuz (F) spacecraft

The most important feature on Salyut 6 was the addition of a second docking port on the aft end of the station, which allowed two spacecraft to be docked at once. This enabled resident crews to receive shorter, visiting expeditions whilst they remained on board, and for crew transfers to take place between the Soyuz craft. Typically, visiting crews returned to Earth in the older Soyuz which the resident crew had flown to the station, leaving a newer craft available to the resident crew as a return vehicle. This procedure allowed resident crews to remain aboard Salyut 6 past the three-month lifespan of the first-generation Soyuz 7K vehicle. Salyut 6 was not occupied continuously, or "handed off" from one expedition to another. Rather, the six resident crews took up occupancy in the station and were visited by various Soyuz support missions and Progress supply tugs, and upon each resident crew's departure, Salyut 6 was vacant. The first long-duration crew to visit the station broke a long-standing endurance record set on board the American Skylab station, staying 96 days in orbit; the longest expedition lasted 185 days. Most of the visiting expeditions were flown as part of the Intercosmos programme, with non-Soviet cosmonauts visiting the station. Vladimír Remek of Czechoslovakia, the first space traveller not from the US or USSR, visited Salyut 6 in 1978, and the station hosted cosmonauts from Hungary, Poland, Romania, Cuba, Mongolia, Vietnam, and East Germany. Georgi Ivanov, a Bulgarian, was a member of the crew of Soyuz 33, which failed to dock with the station. The failure implicated the resident crew's Soyuz 32, with the result that a modified Soyuz 34 was launched to them without a crew, as a return vehicle.

The rearward of the two ports was fitted with plumbing to allow the station to be refueled by uncrewed Progress spacecraft. These freighters, which brought supplies and extra equipment to keep the station replenished, helped ensure that the crew were always able to carry out useful scientific work aboard the station. In all, twelve Progress flights delivered over 20 tonnes of equipment, supplies and fuel.

The addition of the extra docking port caused the adoption of the Almaz-derived twin-chamber propulsion system first used on Salyut 3 and 5, with the two engine nozzles – each producing 2.9 kilonewtons of thrust – mounted peripherally on either side of the aft port. Salyut 6 introduced a unified propulsion system, with both the engines and the station's control thrusters running on N_{2}O_{4} / UDMH, drawn from a common set of pressurized tanks, allowing the refueling capabilities of the visiting Progress tankers to be exploited to the maximal effect. The entire engine and fuel storage assembly was contained within an unpressurized bay at the rear of the station, which had the same diameter as the main pressurized compartment. However, the replacement of the Soyuz engine used on previous stations with the bay meant that the station kept an overall length similar to its predecessors. The main engines could not be fired if the rear docking port was in use, hence any orbital maneuvers during this time had to be performed by the visiting spacecraft.

Salyut 6's propulsion system experienced a serious malfunction during the second crew residency in 1978 and was not usable again for the remainder of the station's lifespan. As a consequence, it was limited to firing its attitude-control thrusters, and visiting spacecraft had to perform orbital adjustments. After each crew residency ended, it was necessary for Progress and TKS spacecraft to boost the station into a high orbit, so it would not decay until the next residency began.

To enable spacewalks, Salyut 6 was equipped with an inward-opening EVA hatch on the side of the forward transfer compartment, which could be used as an airlock in a similar way to the system used on Salyut 4. This compartment contained two new semi-rigid spacesuits, which allowed much greater flexibility than earlier suits and could be donned within five minutes in an emergency. The station offered considerable improvements in living conditions over previous outposts, with machinery being soundproofed, the crews being provided with designated "cots" for sleeping and the equipping of the station with a shower and extensive gymnasium.

=== Instruments ===
The primary instrument carried aboard the station was the BST-1M multispectral telescope, which could carry out astronomical observations in the infrared, ultraviolet and submillimeter spectra using a 1.5 metre-diameter mirror, which was operated in cryogenic conditions at around −269 °C (4 K). The telescope could be operated only when Salyut 6 was on the night side of the Earth and had its cover closed for the rest of the time.

The second major instrument was the MKF-6M multispectral camera, which carried out Earth-resources observations. An improved form of a camera first tested on Soyuz 22, the camera captured an area of 165 × 220 km (103 × 137 mi) with each image, down to a resolution of 20 m (66 ft). Each image was captured simultaneously in six bands in 1200-frame cassettes, which required regular replacement due to the fogging effects of radiation. Salyut 6 also featured a KATE-140 stereoscopic topographic mapping camera with a focal length of 140 mm (5.5 in), which captured images of 450 × 450 km (280 × 280 mi) with a resolution of 50 m (160 ft) in the visible and infrared spectra, which could be operated either remotely or by the resident crews. The photographic capabilities of the station were, therefore, extensive, and the Soviet Ministry of Agriculture had planted a number of specifically selected crops at test sites to examine the capabilities of the cameras.

To further expand its scientific capabilities, Salyut 6 was equipped with 20 portholes for observations, two scientific airlocks to expose equipment to space or eject rubbish, and various pieces of apparatus to carry out biological experiments. Later on during the flight, a Progress spacecraft delivered an external telescope, the KRT-10 radio observatory, which incorporated a directional antenna and five radiometers. The antenna was deployed on the rear docking assembly, with the controller remaining inside the station, and was used for both astronomical and meteorological observations.

== Support craft ==
The original Progress variant, which was first used to resupply Salyut 6 in 1978.

Salyut 6 was primarily supported by the crewed Soyuz spacecraft, which carried out crew rotations and would also have been used in the event of an emergency evacuation. The ferries docked automatically to the station, making use of the new Igla automatic docking system, and were used by departing crews to return to Earth at the end of their flight.

The station was the first to be able to be resupplied by the newly developed uncrewed Progress freighters, although they could only dock at the rear port, as the front port lacked the plumbing used to refuel the propulsion system. The freighters docked automatically to the station via the Igla, and were then opened and emptied by the cosmonauts on board, whilst transfer of fuel to the station took place automatically under supervision from the ground.

In addition to the Soyuz and Progress spacecraft, after the final crew had left, Salyut 6 was visited by an experimental transport logistics spacecraft called Kosmos 1267 in 1982. The transport logistics spacecraft, known as the TKS, was originally designed for the Almaz programme, and proved that large modules could dock automatically with space stations, a major step toward the construction of multimodular stations such as Mir and the International Space Station.

== Resident crews ==
The station received 16 cosmonaut crews, including six long-duration crews, with the longest expedition lasting 185 days. Resident crew missions were identified with an EO prefix, whilst short-duration missions were identified with EP.

1. On 10 December 1977 the first resident crew, Yuri Romanenko and Georgy Grechko, arrived on Soyuz 26 and remained aboard Salyut 6 for 96 days.
2. On 15 June 1978, Vladimir Kovalyonok and Aleksandr Ivanchenkov (Soyuz 29) arrived and remained on board for 140 days.
3. Vladimir Lyakhov and Valery Ryumin (Soyuz 32) arrived on 25 February 1979 and stayed 175 days.
4. On 9 April 1980 Leonid Popov and Valery Ryumin (Soyuz 35) arrived for the longest stay on Salyut 6, 185 days. While aboard, on 19 July 1980, they sent their greetings to the Olympians and wished them happy starts in the live communication between the station and the Central Lenin Stadium, where the opening ceremony of the 1980 Summer Olympics was held. They appeared on the stadium's scoreboard and their voices were translated via loud speakers.
5. A repair mission, consisting of Leonid Kizim, Oleg Makarov, and Gennady Strekalov (Soyuz T-3) worked on the space station for 12 days starting on 27 November 1980.
6. On 12 March 1981 the last resident crew, Vladimir Kovalyonok and Viktor Savinykh (Soyuz T-4), arrived and stayed for 75 days.

== Station operations ==
=== Docking operations ===
On four occasions, a visiting Soyuz craft was transferred from the station's aft port to its forward port. This was done to accommodate upcoming Progress shuttles, which could only refuel the station using connections available at the aft port. Typically, the resident crew would first dock at the forward port, leaving the aft port available for Progress craft and visiting Soyuz support crews. When a support crew docked at the aft port and left in the older, forward Soyuz, the resident crew would move the new vehicle forward by boarding it, undocking, and translating some 100–200 meters away from Salyut 6. Then, ground control would command the station itself to rotate 180 degrees, and the Soyuz would close and re-dock at the forward port. Soyuz 31, 34, 36 and 37 performed the operation, piloted by resident crews after the newer vehicles had been left available by departed support crews.

Spacecraft	Docking day	Docking time	Port	Undocking day	Undocking time	Duration (days)
Soyuz 25	10 October 1977	07:09	front	11 October 1977	~08:00	1.03
Soyuz 26	11 December 1977	06:02	rear	16 January 1978	14:22	36.35
Soyuz 27	11 January 1978	17:06	front	16 March 1978	11:00	63.75
Progress 1	22 January 1978	13:12	rear	7 February 1978	08:55	15.82
Soyuz 28	3 March 1978	20:10	rear	10 March 1978	13:25	6.72
Soyuz 29	17 June 1978	00:58	front	3 September 1978	11:23	78.43
Soyuz 30	29 June 1978	20:08	rear	5 July 1978	13:15	6.71
Progress 2	9 July 1978	15:59	rear	2 August 1978	07:57	23.66
Progress 3	10 August 1978	03:00	rear	21 August 1978	–	~11
Soyuz 31	27 August 1978	19:37	rear	7 September 1978	13:53	10.76
Soyuz 31	7 September 1978	14:21	front	2 November 1978	10:46	55.85
Progress 4	6 October 1978	04:00	rear	24 October 1978	16:07	18.50
Soyuz 32	26 February 1979	08:30	front	13 June 1979	12:51	107.18
Progress 5	14 March 1979	10:20	rear	3 April 1979	19:10	20.37
Progress 6	15 May 1979	09:19	rear	8 June 1979	11:00	24.07
Soyuz 34	8 June 1979	23:02	rear	14 June 1979	19:18	5.84
Soyuz 34	14 June 1979	~19:50	front	19 August 1979	12:08	65.86
Progress 7	30 June 1979	14:18	rear	18 July 1979	06:50	17.69
Soyuz T-1	19 December 1979	17:05	front	24 March 1980	00:04	94.29
Progress 8	29 March 1980	23:01	rear	25 April 1980	11:04	26.50
Soyuz 35	10 April 1980	18:16	front	3 June 1980	14:47	53.85
Progress 9	29 April 1980	11:09	rear	20 May 1980	21:51	21.45
Soyuz 36	27 May 1980	22:56	rear	4 June 1980	18:08	7.86
Soyuz 36	4 June 1980	19:38	front	31 July 1980	14:55	56.86
Soyuz T-2	6 June 1980	18:58	rear	9 June 1980	12:24	2.73
Progress 10	1 July 1980	08:53	rear	18 July 1980	01:21	16.69
Soyuz 37	24 July 1980	23:02	rear	1 August 1980	19:43	7.86
Soyuz 37	1 August 1980	~20:10	front	11 October 1980	09:30	70.56
Soyuz 38	19 September 1980	20:49	rear	26 September 1980	12:35	6.62
Progress 11	30 September 1980	20:03	rear	9 December 1980	13:23	69.72
Soyuz T-3	28 November 1980	18:54	front	10 December 1980	09:10	11.59
Progress 12	26 January 1981	18:56	rear	19 March 1981	21:14	52.09
Soyuz T-4	13 March 1981	23:33	front	26 May 1981	–	~74
Soyuz 39	23 March 1981	19:28	rear	30 March 1981	11:22	
Soyuz 40	15 May 1981	21:50	rear	22 May 1981	13:37	6.66
Kosmos 1267	19 June 1981	10:52	front	permanently docked	–	–

Dates and times are 24-hour Moscow Time. Sources:

=== Station crews ===
Expedition	Crew	Launch date	Flight up	Landing date	Flight down	Duration (days)
Salyut 6 - EO-1	(Soviet Union) Yuri Romanenko, (Soviet Union) Georgy Grechko	10 December 1977; 01:18:40	Soyuz 26	16 March 1978; 11:18:47	Soyuz 27	96.42
Salyut 6 - EP-1	(Soviet Union) Vladimir Dzhanibekov, (Soviet Union) Oleg Makarov	10 January 1978; 12:26:00	Soyuz 27	16 January 1978; 11:24:58	Soyuz 26	5.96
Salyut 6 - EP-2	(Soviet Union) Aleksei Gubarev, (Czechoslovakia) Vladimir Remek	2 March 1978; 15:28:00	Soyuz 28	10 March 1978; 13:44:00	Soyuz 28	7.93
Salyut 6 - EO-2	(Soviet Union) Vladimir Kovalyonok, (Soviet Union) Aleksandr Ivanchenkov	15 June 1978; 20:16:45	Soyuz 29	2 November 1978; 11:04:17	Soyuz 31	139.62
Salyut 6 - EP-3	(Soviet Union) Pyotr Klimuk (Poland) Mirosław Hermaszewski	27 June 1978; 15:27:21	Soyuz 30	5 July 1978; 13:30:20	Soyuz 30	7.92
Salyut 6 - EP-4	(Soviet Union) Valery Bykovsky (East Germany) Sigmund Jähn	26 August 1978; 14:51:30	Soyuz 31	3 September 1978; 11:40:34	Soyuz 29	7.87
Salyut 6 - EO-3	(Soviet Union) Vladimir Lyakhov, (Soviet Union) Valery Ryumin	25 February 1979; 11:53:49	Soyuz 32	19 August 1979; 12:29:26	Soyuz 34	175.02
Salyut 6 - EO-4	(Soviet Union) Leonid Popov, (Soviet Union) Valery Ryumin	9 April 1980; 13:38:22	Soyuz 35	11 October 1980; 09:49:57	Soyuz 37	184.84
Salyut 6 - EP-5	(Soviet Union) Valery Kubasov (Hungary) Bertalan Farkas	26 May 1980; 18:20:39	Soyuz 36	3 June 1980; 15:06:23	Soyuz 35	7.87
Salyut 6 - EP-6	(Soviet Union) Yury Malyshev (Soviet Union) Vladimir Aksyonov	5 June 1980; 14:19:30	Soyuz T-2	9 June 1980; 12:39:00	Soyuz T-2	3.93
Salyut 6 - EP-7	(Soviet Union) Viktor Gorbatko, (Vietnam) Pham Tuan	23 July 1980; 18:33:03	Soyuz 37	31 July 1980; 15:15:02	Soyuz 36	7.86
Salyut 6 - EP-8	(Soviet Union) Yuri Romanenko, (Cuba) Arnaldo Tamayo Méndez	18 September 1980; 19:11:03	Soyuz 38	26 September 1980; 15:54:27	Soyuz 38	7.86
Salyut 6 - EO-5	(Soviet Union) Leonid Kizim, (Soviet Union) Oleg Makarov (Soviet Union) Gennady Strekalov	27 November 1980; 14:18:28	Soyuz T-3	10 December 1980; 09:26:10	Soyuz T-3	12.80
Salyut 6 - EO-6	(Soviet Union) Vladimir Kovalyonok, (Soviet Union) Viktor Savinykh	12 March 1981; 19:00:11	Soyuz T-4	26 May 1981; 12:37:34	Soyuz T-4	74.73
Salyut 6 - EP-9	(Soviet Union) Vladimir Dzhanibekov, (Mongolia) Jügderdemidiin Gürragchaa	22 March 1981; 14:58:55	Soyuz 39	30 March 1981; 11:40:58	Soyuz 39	7.86
Salyut 6 - EP-10	(Soviet Union) Leonid Popov, (Romania) Dumitru Prunariu	14 May 1981; 17:16:38	Soyuz 40	22 May 1981; 13:58:30	Soyuz 40	7.86

Dates and times are 24-hour Coordinated Universal Time.

=== Spacewalks ===
EVA	Spacewalkers	Date	Start	End	Duration (hours)	Comments
Salyut 6 – PE-1	Yuri Romanenko and Georgy Grechko	19 December 1977	21:36	23:04	1:28	Test of Orlan-D spacesuit, inspection of docking apparatus and Medusa cassette deployment.
Salyut 6 – PE-2	Vladimir Kovalyonok and Aleksandr Ivanchenkov	29 July 1978	04:00	06:20	2:05	Retrieval of Medusa cassette and passive micrometeoroid detector, deployment of radiation detector & new experimental cassettes.
Salyut 6 – PE-3	Valery Ryumin and Vladimir Lyakhov	15 August 1979	14:16	15:39	1:23	Removal of KRT-10 radio telescope dish, retrieval of experiment cassettes.

Dates and times are 24-hour Coordinated Universal Time. Source:

== See also ==
- Timeline of longest spaceflights
