= Phạm Tuân =

Retired Vietnam Air Force aviator and astronaut (born 1947)

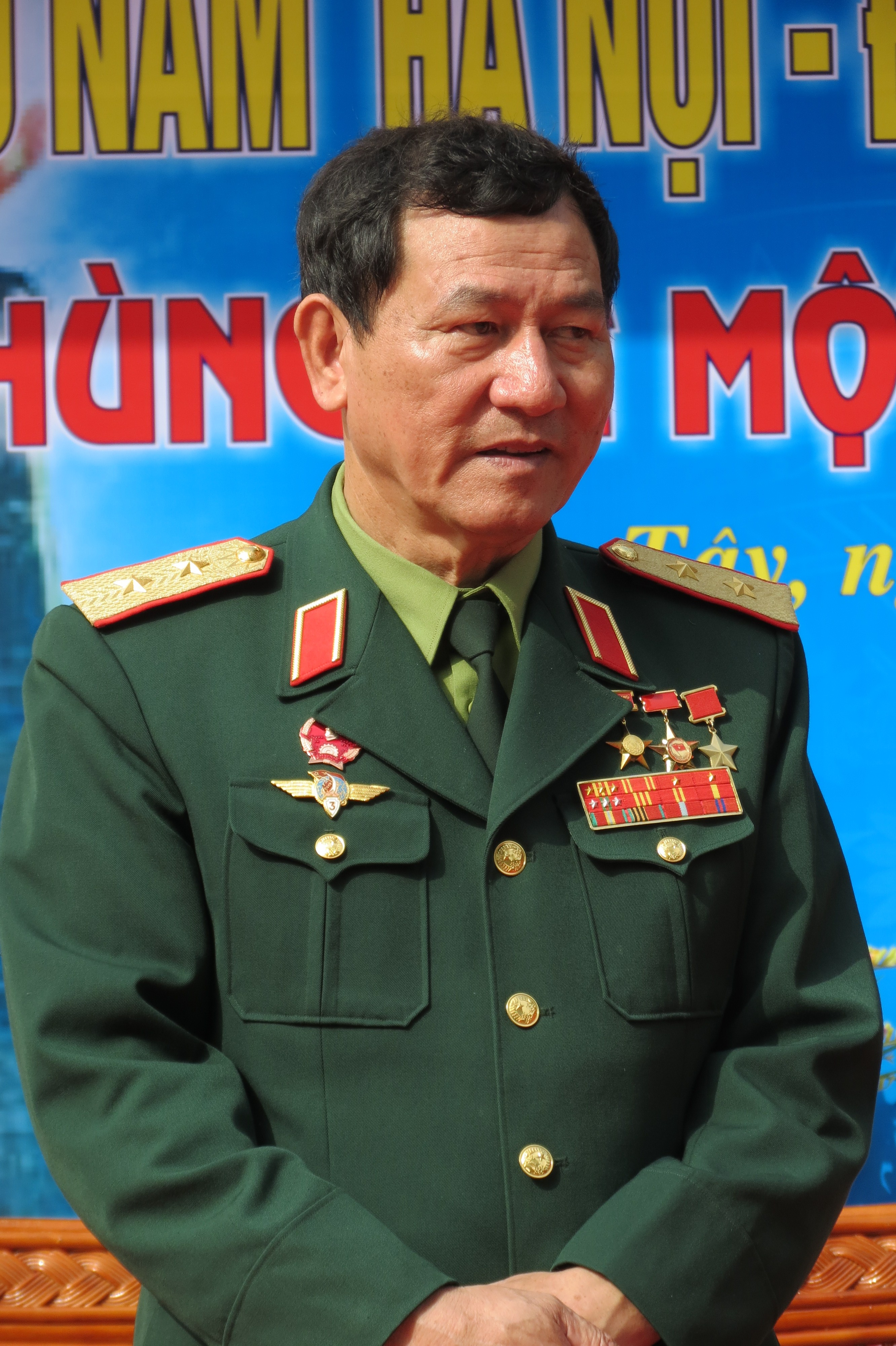
- Tuân in 2012
- Born: February 14, 1947 (age 79); Kiến Xương, Thái Bình province, North Vietnam
- Political party: Communist Party of Vietnam
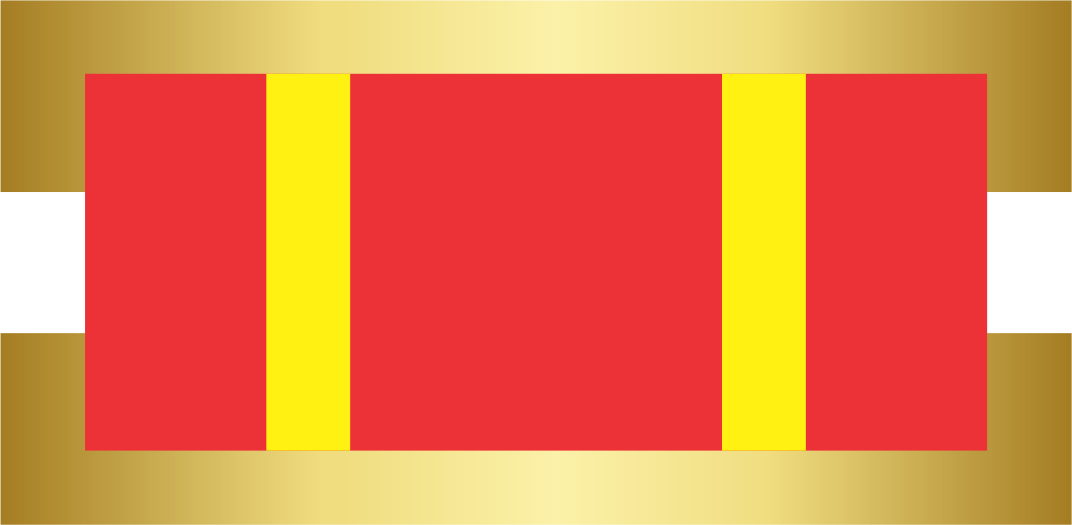
- Awards: Hero of the Soviet Union Order of Lenin; Hero of Labor of Vietnam Order of Ho Chi Minh
- Space career

Vietnam People's Air Force / Intercosmos Research Cosmonaut
- Previous occupation: Pilot
- Status: Retired
- Time in space: 7d 20h 42m
- Selection: 1979 Interkosmos Group
- Missions: Soyuz 37/36
- Retired: Late 2007
- Military career
- Allegiance: North Vietnam; Vietnam
- Branch: Vietnam People's Air Force
- Service years: 1965-2007
- Rank: Lieutenant General
- Conflicts: Vietnam War; Operation Linebacker II
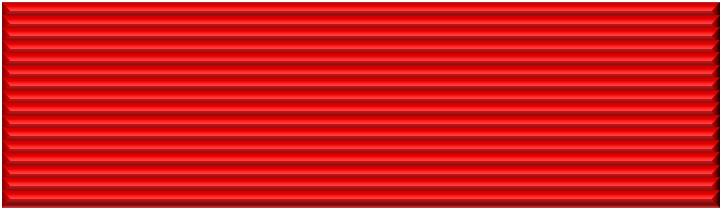
- Awards: Hero of the People's Armed Forces (1973)

Phạm Tuân ([faːm˧ˀ˨ʔ twɜn˨˩] born 14 February 1947) is a retired Vietnamese Air Force fighter pilot and cosmonaut. He became the first Vietnamese cosmonaut, and the first person of Asian origin to be in space when he was launched aboard the Soyuz 37 mission as an Interkosmos research cosmonaut. He was awarded the title Hero of the Soviet Union.

== Early life and military career ==
Phạm Tuân was born on 14 February 1947 in Kiến Xương, Thái Bình province in northern Vietnam.

Initially an Infantry soldier, he was recruited into the Vietnam People's Air Force (VPAF) in 1965 as a radar mechanic student. Tuân was then selected for pilot training as a commissioned officer, graduating at the Krasnodar Flight School in the Soviet Union as a MiG-17 pilot in 1967, then moved-up for training in the MiG-21, and becoming assigned to the VPAF 910th Air Training Regiment from 1968 to 1969 while participating in developing night-time interception techniques against U.S. air raids, and then attached with the 923rd Fighter Regiment from 1969 to 1970, finally with the 921st Fighter Regiment from 1970 to 1973.

On the nights of 18–27 December 1972, during Operation Linebacker II (also referred to as the "Christmas Bombings"), then-Major Phạm engaged USAF Strategic Air Command (SAC) B-52 Stratofortress heavy bombers at least a dozen times. On the 27th, Phạm was able to get close to a B-52 formation at supersonic-speed in his MiG-21MF (#5121), and fire a pair of missiles in the sub-4 km range, visually identifying and reporting that his missile(s) struck the B-52D, causing it to go down in flames over the border of Hòa Bình–Vĩnh Phúc province. This claim, which would be the alleged ‘only’ B-52 downed in air-to-air combat during the war is unclear according to U.S. record, which claims that this B-52 was downed by a surface-to-air missile. In a book named "Hà Nội - Điện Biên Phủ trên không" (Hanoi - the Battle of Dien Bien Phu in the air) by Nguyễn Minh Tâm, published by Nhà xuất bản Quân đội Nhân dân Việt Nam (Viet Nam People's Army Publishing House), the author affirms that Phạm Tuân shot down the B-52 with two K-13 air-to-air missiles within a range of 4 kilometers.

"My plane was only about 10km away from the B-52 bombers when I had detected them. Jettisoning my external (fuel) tank, I've immediately asked for an order to attack (from GCI). Even though I was approaching the bombers beyond the sound-barrier, I felt like time is moving very slowly. The enemy's escort group of F-4 fighters had not detected us. Just to be certain, I continued to shorten the distance, within the 3km range and launched the missiles, and as I was escaping, I clearly saw the moments both missiles exploding against the B-52, now going down in flames... the F-4s would certainly be after me now, but I've escaped."

— Lieutenant General Pham Tuan recounting his successful engagement against the B-52D Stratofortress on night of December 27, 1972

Tuân said that because the B-52 was equipped with a large number of infrared decoys, he had to get close to the target (within 2-3 kilometers) in order to ensure the bomber's destruction, though the minimum safe range for launching missiles is at least 8 kilometers. Numerous air-to-air combat victory claims by the MiG pilots of the VPAF against U.S. combat aircraft have been counter-claimed as losses to surface-to-air missiles or anti-aircraft artillery, as it's considered "less embarrassing" than losing to an enemy pilot.

In 1973, Tuân was granted the title of Hero of the People's Armed Forces in Vietnam. In 1980, Tuân was awarded the "Vietnam Labor Hero" distinction. In 1989, Tuân was given the position of "Deputy Commander for Political Affairs" within the Vietnam People's Air Force. He was promoted to the rank of Lieutenant General in 1999. In 2000, Tuan was Director of the Vietnam Defence Industry. He eventually retired at the end of 2007.

Tuân received numerous distinctions for his service, including the Order of Ho Chi Minh. He also was awarded the Order of Lenin and the rare honor of being one of the few foreigners to receive the title Hero of the Soviet Union.

== Interkosmos program ==
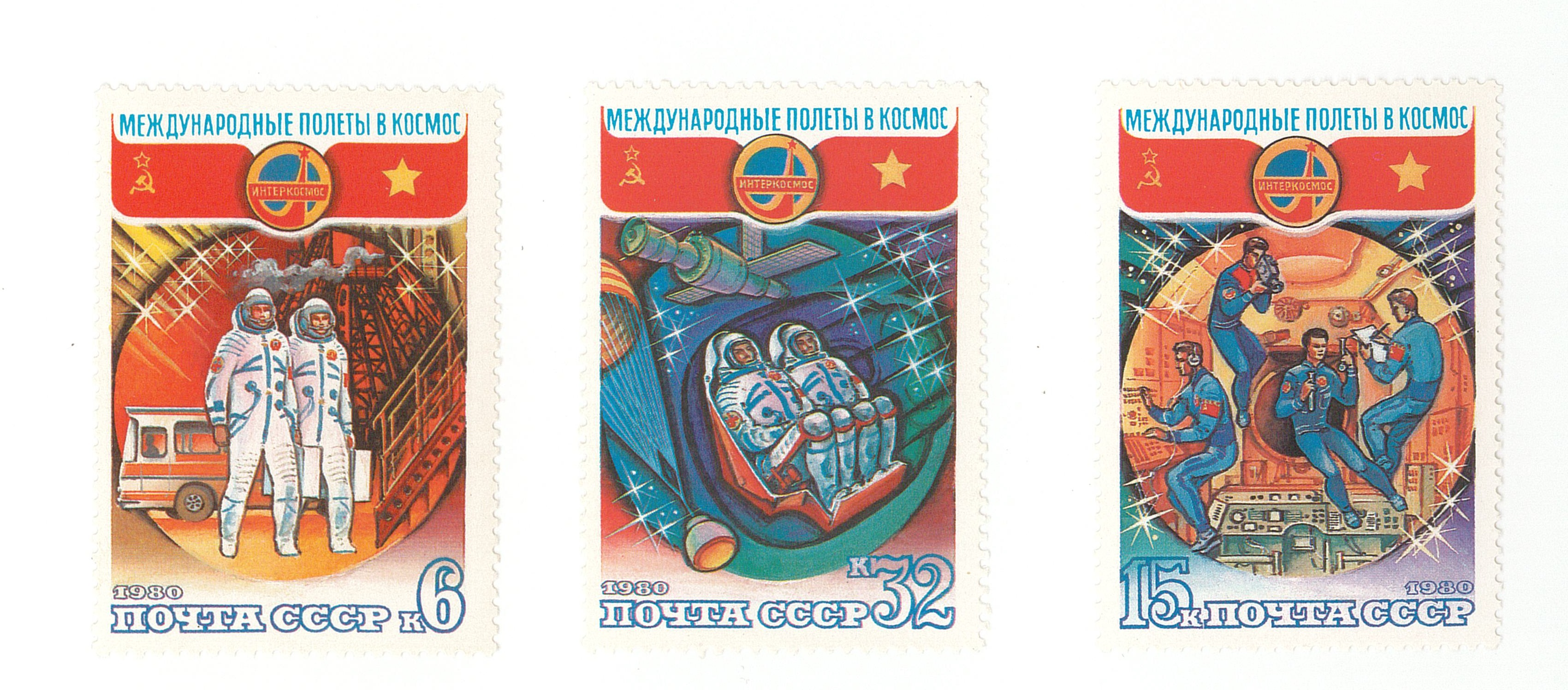
USSR made stamps for the Intercosmos 1980 program

Tuân reached the rank of lieutenant colonel in the VPAF before eventually training to be a research cosmonaut in the joint USSR-Vietnamese space program. Tuân was initially sent to the USSR to train as a radar engineer. There was a shortage of eligible Vietnamese pilots due to most of the applicants not passing the fitness tests, so Tuân was pressured into flight training. Due to this, Tuân was one of three Vietnamese pilots and engineers to be selected by the Soviet Union. On 1 April 1979, he was selected as a member of the sixth international crew for the Interkosmos program. His backup was Bùi Thanh Liêm. Tuân, along with Soviet cosmonaut Viktor Gorbatko, was launched from Baikonur Cosmodrome on 23 July 1980, on board the Soyuz 37 mission to the Salyut 6 space station. Tuân was informed only three days prior that he would be the main pilot of the Soyuz 37.

Before the flight a joint Bulgarian – Soviet mission had been cancelled. Tuân was worried that his voyage would share the same fate. During his flight aboard the Soyuz 37, there were technical issues regarding the engine system. Tuân was commanded to shut down all systems and inform Command of the situation. After this, Command restored the engine to normal and the mission continued.

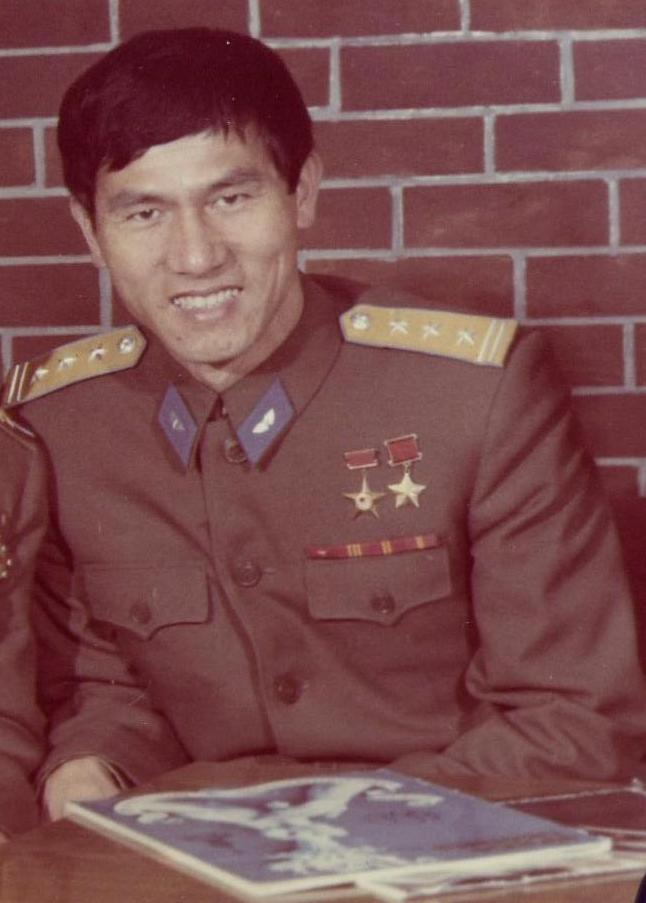
Tuân in 1980

During his time in orbit, Tuân performed experiments on the melting of mineral samples in microgravity. He also carried out plant experiments on azolla and photographed Vietnam from orbit for mapping purposes. Tuân was in space for 7 days, 20 hours, and 42 minutes, completing 142 orbits, and returned to Earth on 31 July 1980.

== Personal life ==
Tuân brought several things with him on the Soyuz 37 flight. These included pictures of former President Hồ Chí Minh and General Secretary Lê Duẩn, as well as Hồ Chí Minh's will and Vietnamese flags. He wanted to stamp all of these at the space station and bring it back to Earth.

Tuân has stated that his personal relationship with his Russian friends has continued to this day. Every year, he travels long distances to meet up with his fellow Russian cosmonauts.

Tuân is married and has two children. He is now a retired Lieutenant General, director of the General Department of Defense Industry of the Ministry of Defence, and is a non-elected member of the National Assembly of Vietnam.

== See also ==
- List of Soyuz missions
- Weapons of the Vietnam War
