= Bùi Thanh Liêm =

Vietnamese cosmonaut

Bùi Thanh Liêm (June 30, 1949 - September 26, 1981) was a Vietnamese cosmonaut.

Born in Hanoi, Vietnam, he was a pilot for the Vietnam People's Air Force who rose to the rank of captain and flew many combat missions during the Vietnam War. In 1978, Liêm graduated from Gagarin Military Air Academy at Monino, Moscow Oblast, Russian Soviet Federative Socialist Republic, Soviet Union.

Liêm was selected as backup of Phạm Tuân, who was the first Vietnamese and the first Asian in space on the Soyuz 37 mission. In 1981, he was killed in a MiG-21 aeroplane crash during a training flight over the Gulf of Tonkin, off the coast of northern Vietnam.
