= Soyuz 37 =

1980 crewed flight of the Soyuz programme

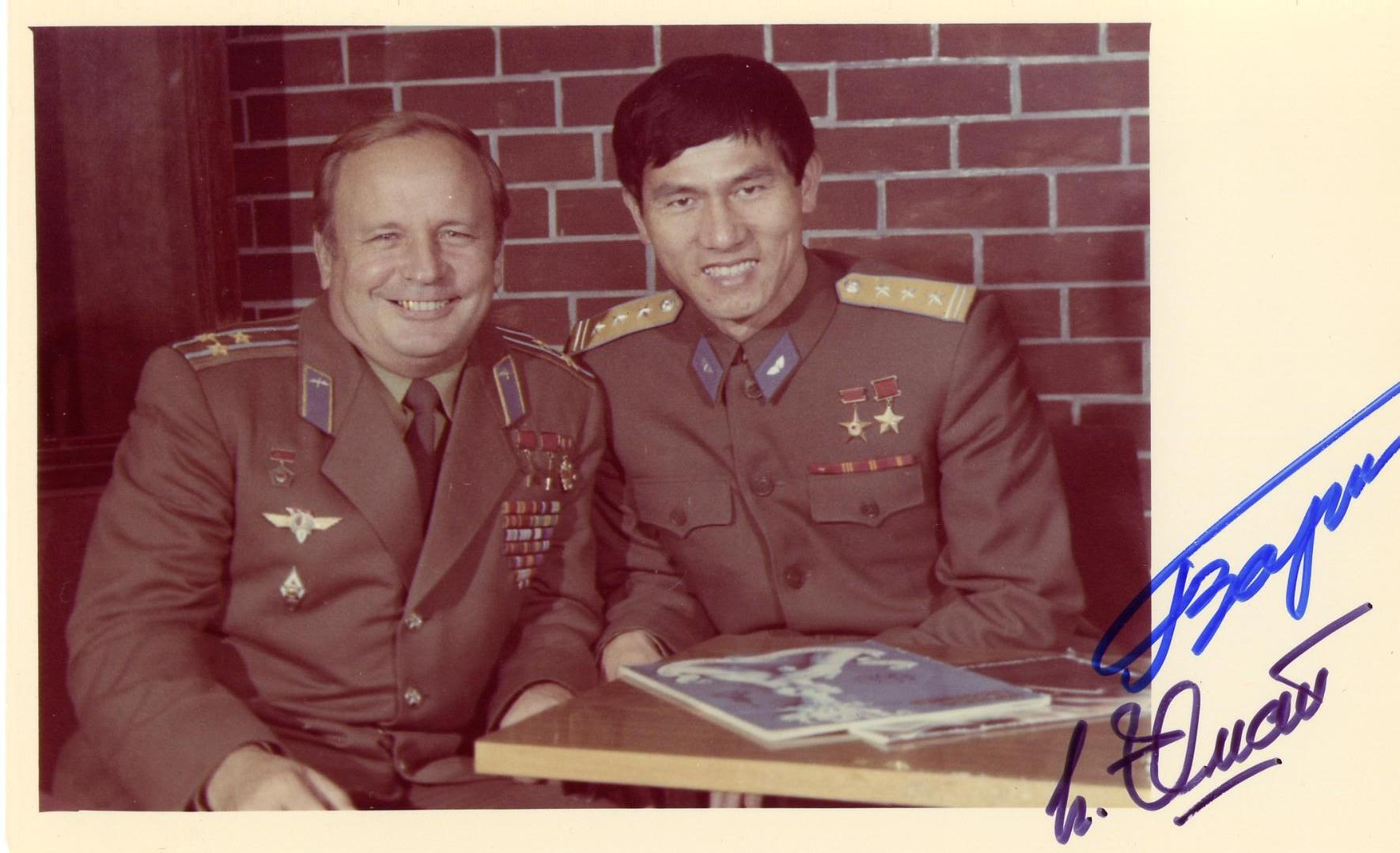
- Crew: Viktor Gorbatko with Phạm Tuân
- COSPAR ID: 1980-064A
- SATCAT no.: 11905
- Mission duration: 79 days, 15 hours, 16 minutes, 54 seconds
- Orbits completed: 124

Spacecraft properties
- Spacecraft type: Soyuz 7K-T
- Manufacturer: NPO Energia
- Launch mass: 6,800 kilograms (15,000 lb)

Crew
- Crew size: 2
- Launching: Viktor Gorbatko; Pham Tuân
- Landing: Leonid Popov; Valery Ryumin
- Callsign: Терек (Terek – Terek River)

Start of mission
- Launch date: July 23, 1980, 18:33:03 UTC
- Rocket: Soyuz-U
- Launch site: Baikonur 1/5

End of mission
- Landing date: October 11, 1980, 09:49:57 UTC
- Landing site: 180 kilometres (110 mi) SE of Dzhezkazgan

Orbital parameters
- Reference system: Geocentric
- Regime: Low Earth
- Perigee altitude: 197.8 kilometres (122.9 mi)
- Apogee altitude: 293.1 kilometres (182.1 mi)
- Inclination: 51.61 degrees
- Period: 89.12 minutes

Docking with Salyut 6
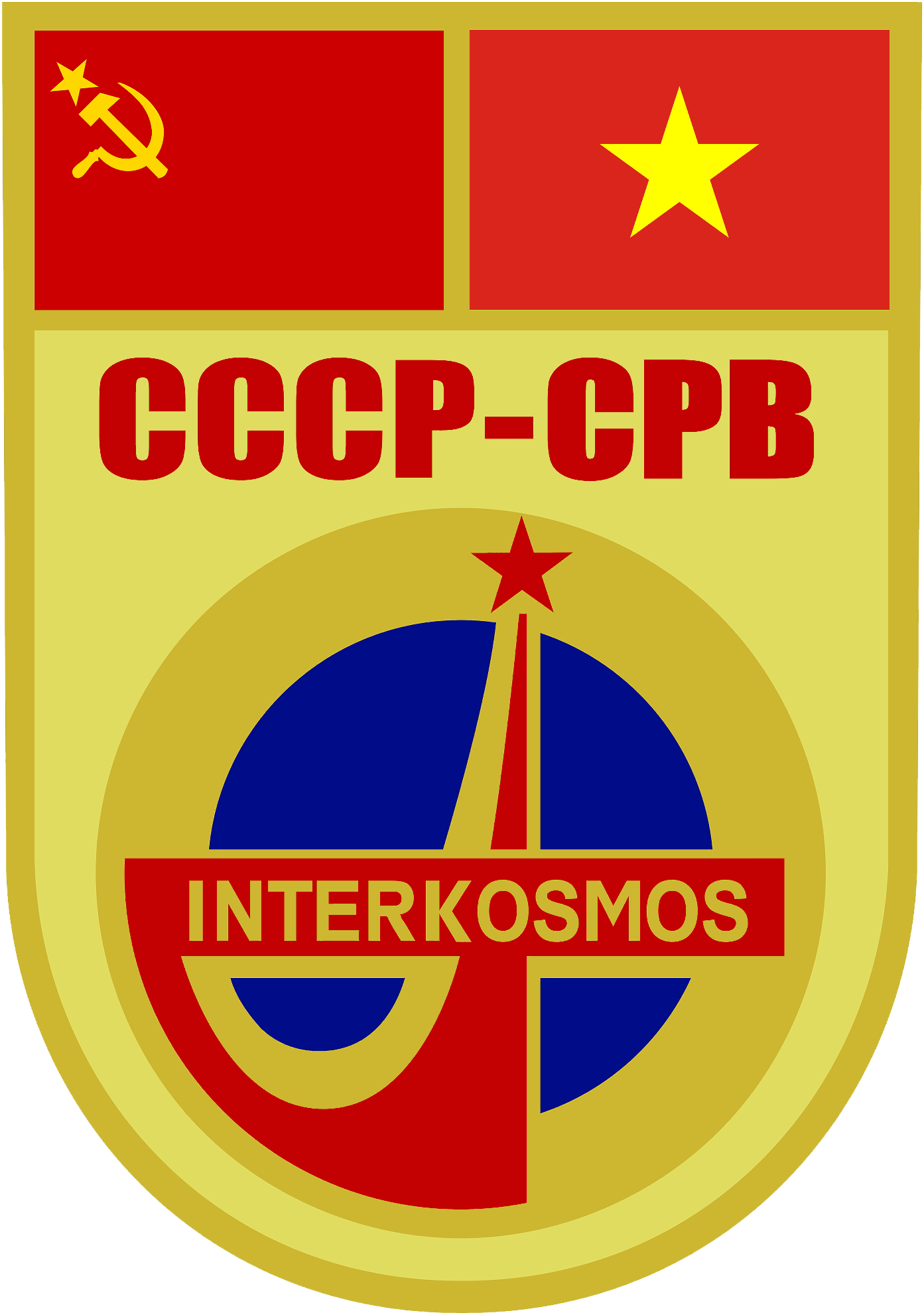
- Soyuz programme (Crewed missions)

Soyuz 37 (Russian: Союз 37, lit. 'Union 37') was a 1980 Soviet crewed space flight to the Salyut 6 space station. It was the 13th mission to and 11th successful docking at the orbiting facility. The Soyuz 37 crew were the third to visit the long-duration Soyuz 35 resident crew.

Soyuz 37 carried Soviet Viktor Gorbatko and Pham Tuan, the first Asian and first Vietnamese cosmonaut, into space. They swapped Soyuz craft with the long-duration crew and returned to Earth in Soyuz 36, the resident crew later used their craft to return to Earth.

== Crew ==
Prime crew
Position	Launching cosmonaut	Landing cosmonaut
Commander	Viktor Gorbatko; Third spaceflight	Leonid Popov; First spaceflight
Flight engineer	Pham Tuan, Interkosmos; Only spaceflight	Valery Ryumin; Third spaceflight

Backup crew
Position	Cosmonaut
Commander	Valery Bykovsky
Flight engineer	Bui Thanh Liem, Interkosmos

== Mission parameters ==
- Mass: 6,800 kg (15,000 lb)
- Perigee: 197.8 km (122.9 mi)
- Apogee: 293.1 km (182.1 mi)
- Inclination: 51.61°
- Period: 89.12 minutes

== Mission highlights ==
Pham Tuan of Vietnam arrived with Commander Viktor Gorbatko aboard Salyut 6 in Soyuz 37; they both returned to Earth in the Soyuz 36 spacecraft approximately eight days later. Tuan's 30 experiments involved observing Vietnam from space, life sciences (including tests of growth of Vietnamese azolla water ferns, with application to future closed-loop life support systems), and materials processing. The long-duration crew launched in Soyuz 35 returned to Earth in the Soyuz 37 spacecraft at the end of their 186-day mission.
