= Valery Kubasov =

Soviet and Russian cosmonaut (1935–2014)

- Валерий Кубасов
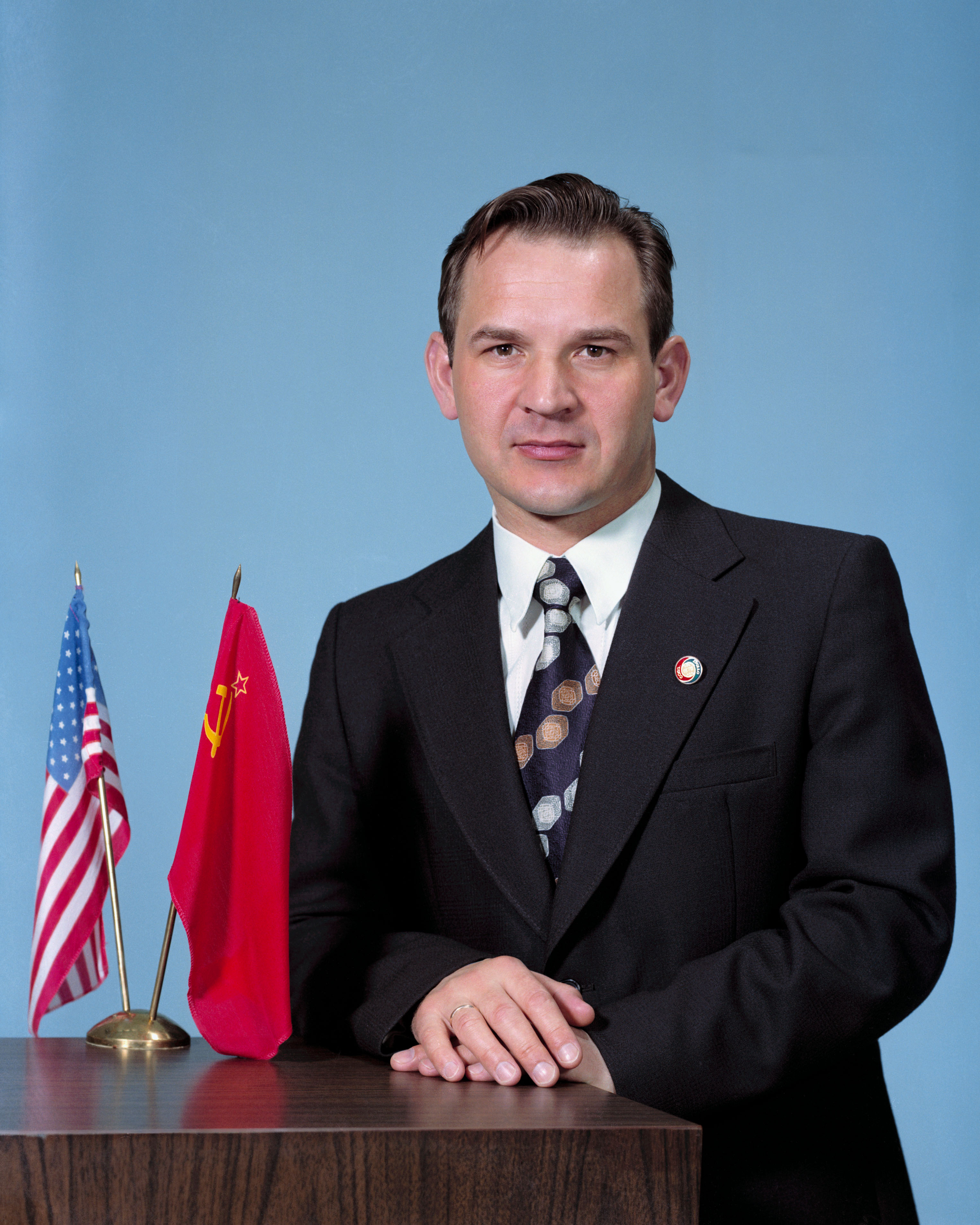
- Kubasov in 1974
- Born: Valeri Nikolayevich Kubasov; 7 January 1935; Vyazniki, Russian SFSR, Soviet Union
- Died: 19 February 2014 (aged 79); Moscow, Russia
- Occupation: Engineer
- Awards: Hero of the Soviet Union (twice)
- Space career

Cosmonaut
- Time in space: 18 days, 17 hours, 59 minutes
- Selection: Civilian Specialist Group 2 (1966)
- Missions: Soyuz 6; Soyuz 19 (Apollo–Soyuz); Soyuz 36/35
- Retired: November 13, 1993

Valery Nikolaevich Kubasov (Russian: Вале́рий Никола́евич Куба́сов; 7 January 1935 – 19 February 2014) was a Soviet and Russian cosmonaut who flew on two missions in the Soyuz programme as a flight engineer: Soyuz 6 and Soyuz 19 (the Apollo–Soyuz mission), and commanded Soyuz 36 in the Intercosmos programme. On 21 July 1975, the Soyuz 7K-TM module used for ASTP landed in Kazakhstan at 5:51 p.m. and Kubasov was the first to exit the craft. Kubasov performed the first welding experiments in space, along with Georgy Shonin.

Kubasov was also involved in the development of the Mir space station. He retired from the Russian space program in November 1993 and was later deputy director of RKK Energia.

Kubasov evaded death twice during his space career. He was part of the crew that was originally intended to fly Soyuz 2A, which was found to have the same faulty parachute sensor that resulted in Vladimir Komarov's death on Soyuz 1 and was later launched without a crew. Later, he was grounded for medical reasons before the Soyuz 11 flight, which killed the crew when the capsule was accidentally depressurised by a faulty valve.

== Early life ==
Kubasov was born 7 January 1935, in Vyazniki, Vladimir Oblast, Ivanovo Industrial Oblast, RSFSR, now Vladimir Oblast, Russia. After finishing secondary school in 1952, he graduated from the Moscow Aviation Institute in 1958 as an aerospace engineer and reported to work at the bureau led by Sergei Korolev. Initially focusing on ballistic studies, Kubasov worked on the design of the Voskhod capsule. He authored several studies on the calculation of spaceship trajectories, and acquired a Master of Science degree in Engineering.

In May 1964, while working for Korolev, Kubasov became one of a handful of civilian candidates who passed preliminary medical screening for one of the Soviet Voskhod missions. Two years later, after some relaxation of the existing rules, Kubasov along with Georgy Grechko and Vladislav Volkov, were officially accepted into the newly established civilian cosmonaut corps.

== Cosmonaut ==
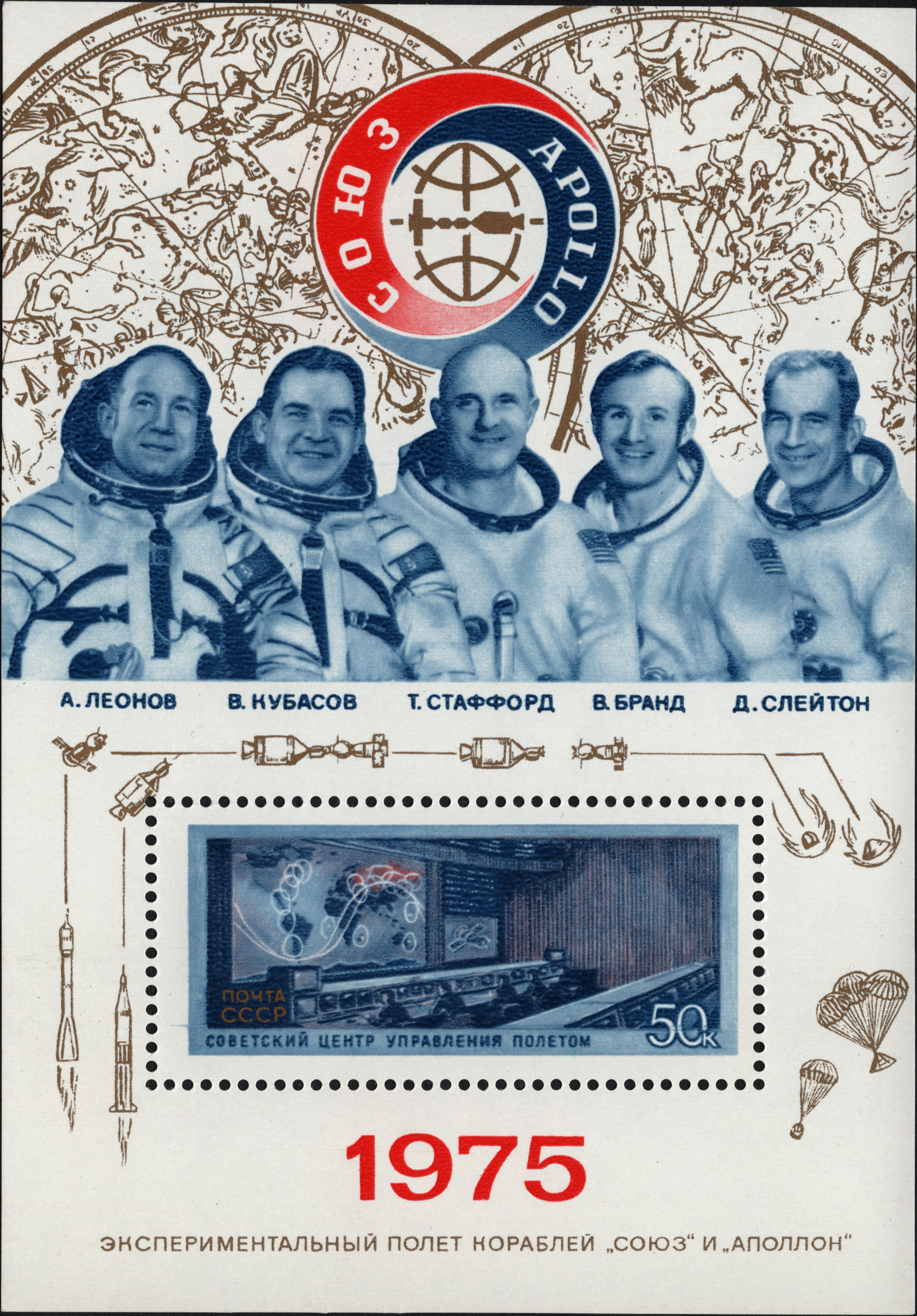
Kubasov (second from left) on a Soviet postage stamp dedicated to the Apollo–Soyuz Test Project, 1975

Kubasov's first space mission, the five-day Soyuz 6 flight in October 1969, was unsuccessful due to technical issues as space vehicles never met up. During Soyuz 6 mission Kubasov and Georgy Shonin performed the first welding experiment in space. The Vulcan furnace required internal hatches between the orbital and descent modules to be sealed, with the welding performed automatically, overseen by Kubasov. Samples of stainless steel and titanium were welded together, then cut, after which the hatches were opened for Kubasov to perform a hand-held welding. However, in 1990 it became known that Vulcan's low-pressure compressed arc had inadvertently targeted a beam at the orbital module wall. Upon opening the hatch, the cosmonauts discovered the damage and, fearing a depressurization, returned to the descent module.

Following his first mission, Kubasov began training to fly aboard the world's first space station, Salyut 1, along with Georgy Shonin and Pyotr Kolodin.

In 1971 Kubasov was almost launched aboard the ill-fated Soyuz 11 mission, he was among the prime crew alongside Alexei Leonov. Medics from the Institute for Biomedical Problems in Moscow found a swelling on Kubasov's right lung. Fearing the onset of tuberculosis, the entire Soyuz 11 prime crew was grounded and replaced by the backup: Georgy Dobrovolsky, Vladislav Volkov and Viktor Patsayev. In his 2004 memoir Two Sides of the Moon Leonov would write: "It turned out later, that [Kubasov] was allergic to a chemical insecticide used to spray trees".

The July, 1975, Apollo–Soyuz Test Project became Kubasov's second space mission and he was a flight engineer on it. Kubasov spent several hours in the Apollo command and docking modules. During this project Kubasov told the U.S. President Gerald Ford in a TV linkup, that they got "good space food... some juice, some coffee and a lot of water".

Kubasov's last spaceflight was aboard Soyuz 36 in 1980. During this flight, the Soyuz transported the crew that included Bertalan Farkas, the first Hungarian astronaut. Kubasov retired as a cosmonaut on 13 November 1993.

== Death ==
Kubasov died in Moscow of natural causes on 19 February 2014, at the age of 79. He was survived by his wife Lyudmila Kurovskaya, daughter Ekaterina and son Dmitry.

== Awards ==
- Twice Hero of the Soviet Union (1969, 1975)
- Pilot-Cosmonaut of the USSR (1969)
- Three Orders of Lenin (1969, 1975, 1980)
- Medal "For Merit in Space Exploration" (2011)
- Medal "Veteran of Labour" (1985)
- Tsiolkovsky Gold Medal of the Academy of Sciences of the USSR
- Hero of the Hungarian People's Republic
- Gold medal "For Merit in the Development of Science and Humanity" (Czechoslovakia)
- Medal "People's Technicist" (Yugoslavia)
- In 2000, Kubasov was inducted into the International Air & Space Hall of Fame at the San Diego Air & Space Museum.

Kubasov, along with Slayton and Brand, won the Yuri Gagarin Gold Medal from FAI in 1976.

Kubasov was also an honorary citizen of the following cities: Vyazniki, Kaluga, Vladimir, Karaganda, Arkalyk, New York City, Houston, San Francisco, Atlanta, Nashville, and Salt Lake City.
