= Soyuz 36 =

Crewed flight of the Soyuz programme

- COSPAR ID: 1980-041A
- SATCAT no.: 11811
- Mission duration: 65 days, 20 hours, 54 minutes, 23 seconds

Spacecraft properties
- Spacecraft type: Soyuz 7K-T
- Manufacturer: NPO Energia
- Launch mass: 6,800 kilograms (15,000 lb)

Crew
- Crew size: 2
- Launching: Valeri Kubasov; Bertalan Farkas
- Landing: Viktor Gorbatko; Pham Tuân
- Callsign: Орион (Orion - "Orion")

Start of mission
- Launch date: 26 May 1980, 18:20:39 UTC
- Rocket: Soyuz-U
- Launch site: Baikonur 31/6

End of mission
- Landing date: 31 July 1980, 15:15:02 UTC
- Landing site: 140 kilometres (87 mi) SE of Dzhezkazgan

Orbital parameters
- Reference system: Geocentric
- Regime: Low Earth
- Perigee altitude: 197.5 kilometres (122.7 mi)
- Apogee altitude: 281.9 kilometres (175.2 mi)
- Inclination: 51.62 degrees
- Period: 89.0 minutes

Docking with Salyut 6
- Docking port: Aft port
- Docking date: May 27, 1980, 19:56 UTC
- Undocking date: July 04, 1980, 16:39 UTC
- Time docked: 37d 20h 43m

Redocking with Salyut 6
- Redocking port: Front port
- Redocking date: July 04, 1980, 17:09 UTC
- Unredocking date: July 31, 1980, 11:55 UTC
- Time redocked: 26d 18h 46m
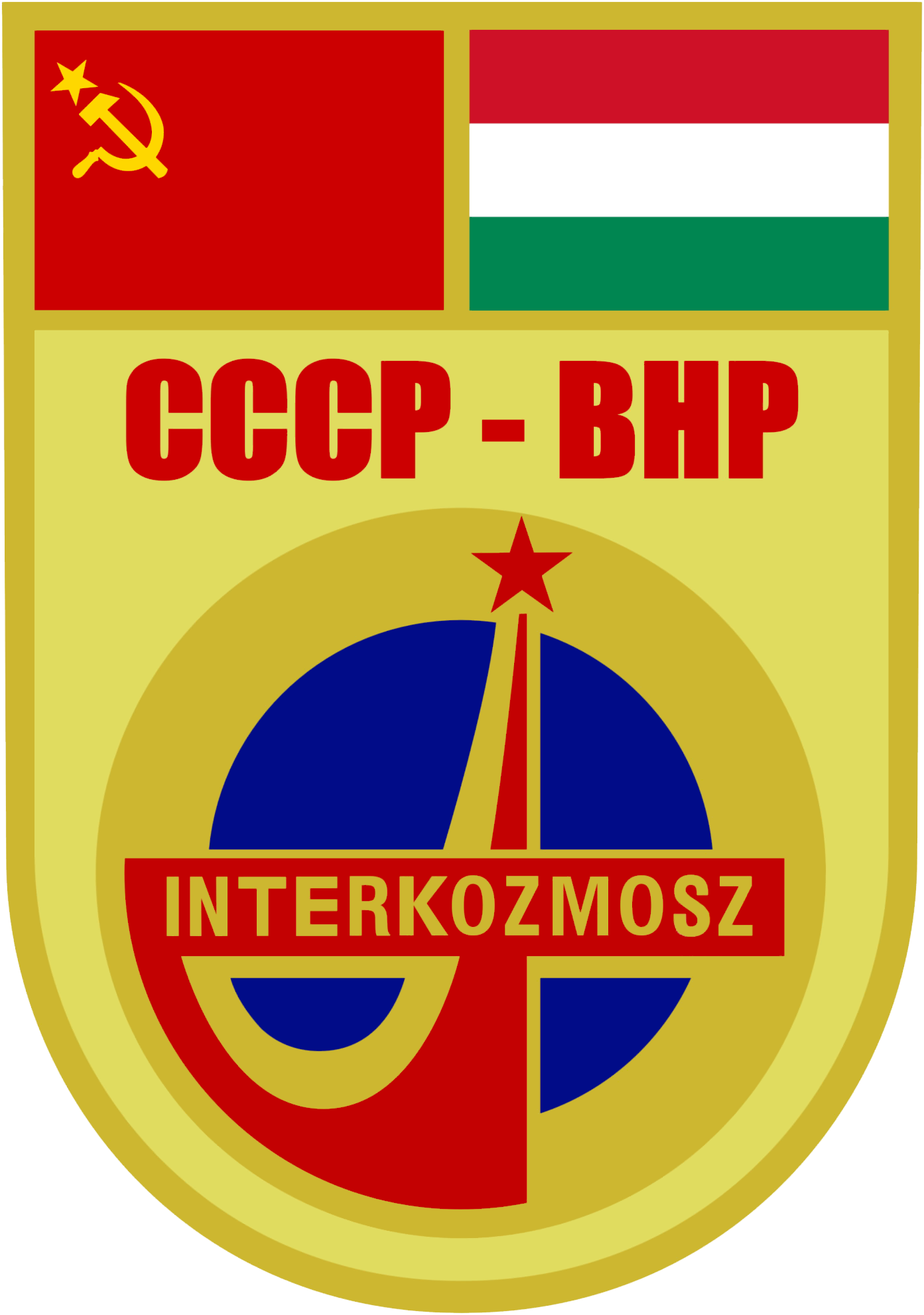
- Soyuz programme (Crewed missions)

Soyuz 36 (Russian: Союз 36, Union 36) was a 1980 Soviet crewed space flight to the Salyut 6 space station. It was the 11th mission to and ninth successful docking at the orbiting facility. The Soyuz 36 crew were the first to visit the long-duration Soyuz 35 resident crew.

Soyuz 36 carried Valery Kubasov and Bertalan Farkas, the first Hungarian cosmonaut, into space. They swapped Soyuz craft with the long-duration crew and returned to Earth in Soyuz 35; a later crew used their craft to return to Earth.

== Crew ==
Prime crew
Position	Launching cosmonaut	Landing cosmonaut
Commander	Valery Kubasov; Third and last spaceflight	Viktor Gorbatko; Third and last spaceflight
Research cosmonaut	Bertalan Farkas, Interkosmos; Only spaceflight	Pham Tuân, Interkosmos; Only spaceflight

Backup crew
Position	Cosmonaut
Commander	Vladimir Dzhanibekov
Research cosmonaut	Béla Magyari

== Mission parameters ==
- Mass: 6,800 kg (15,000 lb)
- Perigee: 197.5 km (122.7 mi)
- Apogee: 281.9 km (175.2 mi)
- Inclination: 51.62°
- Period: 89.0 minutes

== Mission highlights ==
Soyuz 36 was launched on 26 May 1980 with Valery Kubasov and Hungarian cosmonaut Bertalan Farkas, headed to the Salyut 6 space station where Leonid Popov and Valery Ryumin, launched aboard Soyuz 35, were resident. The flight was originally scheduled for 5 June 1979, but was cancelled due to the Soyuz 33 failure. They successfully docked at the aft port the day after launching. The flight was the fifth Intercosmos flight whereby guest cosmonauts from Soviet allied nations would visit the space station, typically for about a week. The flight was only the second time a Soviet mission had a civilian commander.

Upon boarding, the visiting crew carried out Hungarian experiments, so many that the visiting crew sometimes only got three hours of sleep. One experiment was Pille, which measured radiation doses received by the crew with miniature thermoluminescent devices attached to their clothing and to the walls of the station. Another three experiments studied the formation of interferon in human cells under weightless conditions. Earth resources work using the on-board cameras were carried out, in coordination with ground crews, airplanes and helicopters.

Farkas was said by the Hungarian press to have adjusted far quicker than Kubasov to the weightless conditions.

The Soyuz craft was used to boost the station's orbit on 29 May, then Kubasov and Farkas swapped Soyuz craft with the long-duration crew, exchanging seat liners, pressure suits and personal items, before departing the station in Soyuz 35 on 3 June and landed 140 km southeast of Dzhezkazgan. The Soyuz 36 spacecraft was later used to return the crew of Soyuz 37 to earth.
