= Kiến Xương =

Kiến Xương Xã Kiến Xương
- Commune
- Kiến Xương commune
- Location within Vietnam
- Coordinates: 20°23′21″N 106°26′34″E
- Country: Vietnam
- Region: Red River Delta
- Province: Hưng Yên
- Establish: June 16, 2025

Area
  - Total: 14.18 sq mi (36.73 km^{2})

Population 2025
  - Total: 47.950 people
  - Density: 3.381/sq mi (1.305/km^{2})
- Time zone: UTC+7 (UTC + 7)

Kiến Xương is a commune (xã) of Hưng Yên Province, Vietnam.

== Geography ==
Kiến Xương Commune is located in the southern part of Hưng Yên Province, with the following geographical boundaries:

- To the east, it borders Tiền Hải Commune and Tây Tiền Hải Commune.
- To the south, it borders Bình Thanh Commune and Bình Định Commune.
- To the west, it borders Vũ Quý Commune and Hồng Vũ Commune.
- To the north, it borders Lê Lợi Commune and Quang Lịch Commune.

== History ==
Prior to 1945, the area currently occupied by Kiến Xương Town corresponded to the two communes of Thanh Nê and An Bồi, situated within the An Bồi canton (tổng) of Trực Định District, Kiến Xương Prefecture (phủ). Specifically, Thanh Nê Commune comprised four hamlets: La, Đoài, Trung, and Đông.

In October 1947, Thanh Nê Commune merged with An Bồi Commune to form Tán Thuật Commune. The new commune was named after the Military Affairs Commissioner Nguyễn Thiện Thuật, the leader of the Bãi Sậy Uprising—one of the uprisings within the Cần Vương Movement against French rule in the late 19th century.

In June 1955, Tán Thuật Commune was divided into two communes: Tán Thuật and An Bồi.

On June 8, 1988, the Council of Ministers issued Decision 102-HĐBT. Pursuant to this decision, the hamlets of Tân Tiến and Quang Trung were separated from Tán Thuật Commune to establish Kiến Xương Town, the district seat of Kiến Xương District.

Following its establishment, Kiến Xương Town covered a natural area of 109.72 hectares and had a population of 4,649. Tán Thuật Commune retained 10 hamlets—Chấn Đông, Đông Trung, Minh Đức, Giang Đông, Trung Giao, Trung Đồng, Tiền Tiến, Tự Tiến, Hưng Long, and Văn Khôi—covering a natural area of 538.40 hectares and having a population of 4,277. On April 12, 2002, the Government issued Decree No. 45/2002/ND-CP. Accordingly, the entire natural area and population of Kien Xuong Town and Tan Thuat Commune were merged to establish Thanh Ne Town. On February 11, 2020, the National Assembly Standing Committee issued Resolution No. 892/NQ-UBTVQH14 regarding the reorganization of commune-level administrative units within Thái Bình Province (the resolution took effect on March 1, 2020). Pursuant to this resolution, the entire land area and population of An Bồi Commune were merged into Thanh Nê Town to re-establish Kiến Xương Town. On June 16, 2025, the National Assembly Standing Committee issued Resolution No. 1666/NQ-UBTVQH15 regarding the reorganization of commune-level administrative units in Hưng Yên Province in 2025. Accordingly, the entire natural area and population of Kiến Xương Town—along with the communes of Bình Minh, Quang Trung, Quang Minh, and Quang Bình (Kiến Xương District)—were consolidated to form a new commune named **Kiến Xương Commune**.

== Notable figures ==
- The most renowned figure from the former commune of Thanh Nê was Doctor Trương Đăng Quỹ, who passed the doctoral examinations in 1776. He held various high-ranking positions under the Lê-Trịnh dynasty, including Censor at the Hanlin Academy, Chief Censor for multiple regions, Commissioner of Justice for the Kinh Bắc region, Governor of Nghệ An, and Vice-Minister of Administration for the Thanh Hóa region, among others.
- The female guerrilla platoon of Tán Thuật commune—founded and commanded by Nguyễn Thị Chiên—was a pioneering combat unit in the region. Nguyễn Thị Chiên was conferred the title of Hero of the People's Armed Forces in 1952, becoming the first female hero of the Vietnamese armed forces.
