= Vladimir Aksyonov =

Soviet pilot, cosmonaut and mining engineer (1935–2024)

- Владимир Аксёнов
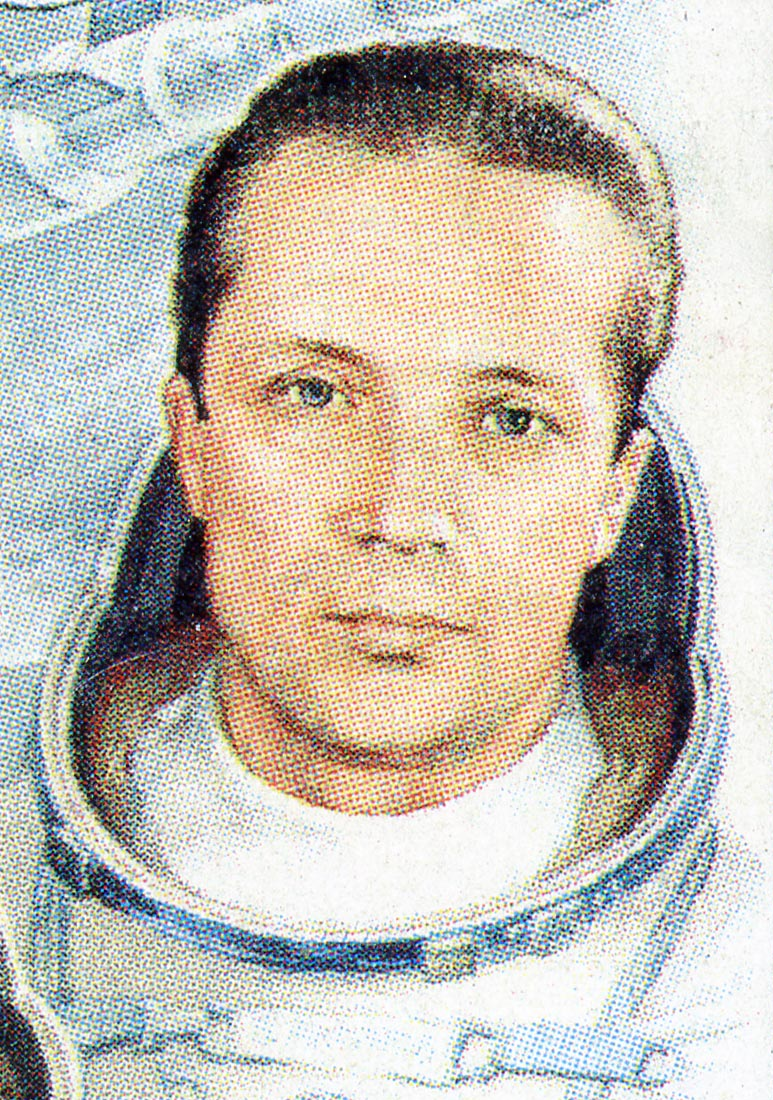
- Aksyonov on a 1980 Soviet stamp
- Born: 1 February 1935; Giblitsy, Kasimovsky District, Soviet Union (now Russia)
- Died: 9 April 2024 (aged 89); Moscow, Russia
- Occupation: Pilot
- Awards: Hero of the Soviet Union (twice)
- Space career

Cosmonaut
- Time in space: 11d 20h 11m
- Selection: Civilian Specialist Group 5
- Missions: Soyuz 22; Soyuz T-2

Vladimir Viktorovich Aksyonov (Russian: Владимир Викторович Аксёнов; 1 February 1935 – 9 April 2024) was a Soviet cosmonaut who served as the flight engineer on Soyuz 22 and Soyuz T-2.

== Early life ==
Aksyonov was born on 1 February 1935 in Giblitsy in the Kasimovsky District to a Russian family. He became orphaned in his youth, with his father Viktor Stepanovich Zhivoglyadov being killed in action in 1944 on the Eastern Front of World War II; his mother Aleksandra Ivanovna Aksyonova worked as an accountant before she died in 1949. He was then raised by his maternal grandparents, who were well educated. That year, he became a member of the Komsomol and graduated from a rural seven-year school where he received good grades before being admitted to the Asimov Industrial College. In 1950, his family decided to send him to Kaliningrad, Moscow Oblast, to live with his aunt. He went on to attend the Mytishchi Engineering College, which he graduated from in 1953. He then attended the 10th Military Aviation School for Primary Pilot Training in Kremenchuk, which he graduated from with honors in 1955, and then went to the Chuguev Military Aviation School of Pilots. However, he left the school in December 1956 due to being demobilized in the mass reduction of Soviet troops. The next year he began working for OKB-1, and in 1963 he graduated from the All-Union Correspondence Polytechnic Institute with a degree in mechanical engineering. Previously in 1959, he became a member of the Communist Party. Eventually he began working at the test department, led by Sergey Anokhin. A government decree on 15 June 1966 permitted civilians and former military personnel to be crew members on Soyuz flights. As a tester, Aksyonov flew over 250 flights on laboratory aircraft and worked in simulations of zero gravity. However, it was not until 1973 that be became a cosmonaut candidate.

== Cosmonaut career ==
Having been admitted to the cosmonaut corps as a civilian cosmonaut in 1973, he initially trained for spaceflight in the 7K-S with Leonid Kizim, and helped train a group of fellow civilian flight engineers. In January 1976, he started training with Valery Bykovsky to operate the MKF-6 camera, which was made in East Germany. On 15 September 1976, he was launched into space for the first time, serving as a flight engineer on Soyuz 22, with Valery Bykovsky in command. They spent a week in orbit, taking photographs of various locations on Earth including parts of East Germany and the Soviet Union as well as photos of the Moon, totaling 2,400 photographs, and returned to earth on 23 September. The crew had some difficulty changing out the rolls of film in the MKF-6 camera, and their feedback was used in the design of the later MKF-6M version of the camera. The flight lasted 7 days 21 hours and 52 minutes. For his work on the flight he was awarded the title Hero of the Soviet Union on 28 September.

After his flight on Soyuz 22 he remained with the cosmonaut program, and continued to train with the 7K-ST group until 1978, and from 1978 to 1980 he trained to serve as flight engineer on the Soyuz T. On 5 June 1980, he was launched into space as the flight engineer on the Soyuz T-2 with Yuri Malyshev in command to visit the Salyut 6 space station. Before docking with the station on 6 June, they oriented the Soyuz capsule towards the sun to do a test of new solar cells. While the Soyuz T-2 docking was supposed to be done automatically, due to a technical failure, Malyshev had to revert to manual control, but he managed to perform the approach and docking successfully on manual mode. The flight was a success, and they returned to Earth on 9 June, spending 3 days 22 hours and 19 minutes in space. For his success in the Soyuz T-2 flight he was awarded the title Hero of the Soviet Union again on 16 June. In total he spent 11 days 20 hours and 11 minutes in space.

From 1983 to 1992, he was deputy chairman of the board of the Soviet Peace Fund.

== Later life ==
After retiring from the cosmonaut program in 1988, he became director of the State Research Center for the Study of Natural Resources of the State Hydrometeorological Service. From 1990 to 1992 he worked as general direct of the NPO Planeta. In 1992, he became deputy chairman of the Executive Committee of the Cosmos Association. Meanwhile, from 1990 to 1996, he was deputy chairman of the board of directors of Mosbiznesbanka. In 1996, he became the chairman of the presidium of the public organization "Spiritual Movement of Russia". In 2001, he became the president of the Institute for Security and Sustainable Development Science Foundation. Aksyonov lived in Moscow. He died on 9 April 2024, at the age of 89. He was buried with military honours in the Federal Military Memorial Cemetery on 11 April.

== Awards ==
- Twice Hero of the Soviet Union (28 September 1976 and 17 July 1980)
- Two Orders of Lenin (28 September 1976 and 16 June 1980)
- Medal "For Merit in Space Exploration" (12 April 2011)
- Medal "Veteran of Labour"
- Gold medal "For services to science and humanity" (Czechoslovakia)
- Order of Karl Marx (13 October 1976)
- Pilot-Cosmonaut of the USSR (28 September 1976)
- Honoured Master of Sports of the USSR
- Honorary Citizen of Ryazan (29 November 1976)
