= Interkosmos =

Soviet international spaceflight program

Interkosmos space program
- Космическая Программа "Интеркосмос"; Kosmicheskaya Programma "Interkosmos"
- Interkosmos patch

Program overview
- Country: Soviet Union (1967–1991); Russia (1992–1994)
- Organization: Soviet space program (1967–1991); Roscosmos (1992–1994)
- Purpose: crewed and uncrewed space mission for Soviet allies
- Status: Completed

Program history
- Duration: 1967–1994
- First flight: Vertikal 1; November 28, 1970
- First crewed flight: Soyuz 28; March 2, 1978
- Last flight: Interkosmos 26; March 2, 1994
- Launch site: Baikonur

The Interkosmos space program (Note: Russian: Космическая Программа "Интеркосмос", romanized: Kosmicheskaya Programma "Interkosmos", lit. 'Space program "Interkosmos"') was an international Soviet space program designed to promote cooperation among socialist countries in space exploration and research. Formed in April 1967 in Moscow, it was led by the Soviet Union and primarily involved allied or friendly countries from the Eastern Bloc and Non-Aligned Movement, which were provided training and technical support with crewed and uncrewed space missions.

Interkosmos was established at the height of the Cold War "Space Race" between the Soviet Union and the United States, which competed to achieve superior spaceflight capability. The respective successes were exploited by both sides for propaganda purposes, with Interkosmos aimed at demonstrating solidarity and unity between the Soviets and aligned or sympathetic countries.

All members of Interkosmos from the USSR were awarded Hero of the Soviet Union or the Order of Lenin. The program included members of the Warsaw Pact and CoMEcon, as well as other socialist states like Afghanistan, Cuba, Mongolia, and Vietnam. Non-aligned nations such as India and Syria participated, as did capitalist states such as the United Kingdom, France and Austria. Most crewed missions consisted of non-Soviet cosmonauts being placed on routine flights with experienced Soviet cosmonauts.

Interkosmos was responsible for many inaugural achievements in the history of spaceflight, including the first citizen of a country other than the U.S. or USSR (Vladimír Remek of Czechoslovakia), the first black and Hispanic person (Arnaldo Tamayo Méndez of Cuba), and the first Asian person (Phạm Tuân of Vietnam).

== History ==
Beginning in April 1967 with unpiloted research satellite missions, the first crewed Interkosmos mission occurred in February 1978. Joint crewed spaceflights enabled 14 non-Soviet cosmonauts to participate in Soyuz space flights between 1978 and 1988. The program was responsible for sending into space the first citizen of a country other than the US or USSR: Vladimír Remek of Czechoslovakia. Interkosmos also resulted in the first black and Hispanic person in space, Arnaldo Tamayo Méndez of Cuba, and the first Asian person in space, Phạm Tuân of Vietnam. Of the countries involved, only Bulgaria sent two cosmonauts to space, although the second one did not fly under the Interkosmos program, and the French spationaut Jean-Loup Chrétien flew on two flights.

The Soviet Union also offered commercial joint human spaceflight missions to the United Kingdom and Japan, resulting in the first British and Japanese cosmonauts. In the early 1980s, an offer was made to Finland, with test pilot Jyrki Laukkanen mentioned a potential candidate. The pilots of the Test Flight (Koelentue) refused on the grounds that participation would not benefit the flight or test pilot activity in any way; no further offers were made to Finland.

== Crewed missions ==
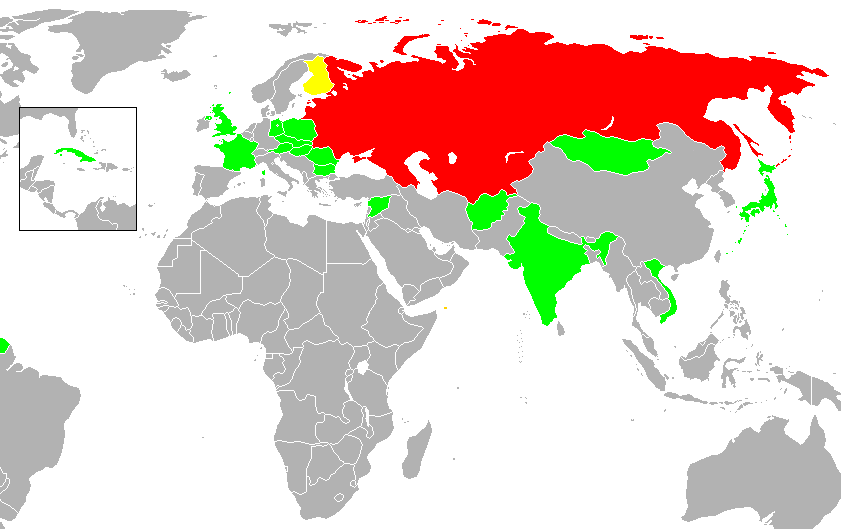
Human spaceflight provider participants refused offer

Date	Image	Prime	Backup	Country	Mission	Pin	Space station
2 March 1978		Vladimír Remek	Oldřich Pelčák	Czechoslovakia	Soyuz 28		Salyut 6
27 June 1978		Mirosław Hermaszewski	Zenon Jankowski	Poland	Soyuz 30		Salyut 6
26 August 1978		Sigmund Jähn	Eberhard Köllner	East Germany	Soyuz 31		Salyut 6
10 April 1979		Georgi Ivanov	Aleksandr Aleksandrov	Bulgaria	Soyuz 33		Salyut 6 (Docking failed)
26 May 1980		Bertalan Farkas	Béla Magyari	Hungary	Soyuz 36		Salyut 6
23 July 1980		Phạm Tuân	Bùi Thanh Liêm	Vietnam	Soyuz 37		Salyut 6
18 September 1980		Arnaldo Tamayo Méndez	José López Falcón	Cuba	Soyuz 38		Salyut 6
23 March 1981		Jügderdemidiin Gürragchaa	Maidarjavyn Ganzorig	Mongolia	Soyuz 39		Salyut 6
14 May 1981		Dumitru Prunariu	Dumitru Dediu	Romania	Soyuz 40		Salyut 6
24 June 1982		Jean-Loup Chrétien	Patrick Baudry	France	Soyuz T-6		Salyut 7
2 April 1984		Rakesh Sharma	Ravish Malhotra	India	Soyuz T-11		Salyut 7
22 July 1987		Muhammed Ahmed Faris	Munir Habib Habib	Syria	Soyuz TM-3		Mir
7 June 1988		Aleksandr Aleksandrov	Krasimir Stoyanov	Bulgaria	Soyuz TM-5		Mir
29 August 1988		Abdul Ahad Mohmand	Mohammad Dauran Ghulam Masum	Afghanistan	Soyuz TM-6		Mir
26 November 1988		Jean-Loup Chrétien	Michel Tognini	France	Soyuz TM-7		Mir
2 December 1990		Toyohiro Akiyama	Ryoko Kikuchi	Japan	Soyuz TM-11		Mir
18 May 1991		Helen Sharman	Timothy Mace	United Kingdom	Soyuz TM-12		Mir
2 October 1991		Franz Viehböck	Clemens Lothaller	Austria	Soyuz TM-13		Mir

== Uncrewed missions ==
- 1970 November 28 — Vertikal-1 Aeronomy/Ionosphere/Solar mission.
- 1971 August 20 — Vertikal-2 Solar Ultraviolet/Solar X-ray mission.
- 1972 April 7 — Interkosmos 6 - Investigation of primary cosmic radiation and meteoritic particles in near-earth outer space.
- 1973 April 4 — Interkosmos 9 "Copernicus-500" - satellite of cooperation of the Polish People's Republic and Soviet Union to study the Sun and ionosphere. Orbit around 200–1550 km.
- 1975 June 3 — Interkosmos 14
- 1975 September 2 — Vertikal-3 Solar Ultraviolet/Solar X-ray mission.
- 1976 — Re-entry Vehicle Test mission.
- 1976 June 19 — Interkosmos 15. Testing of new systems and components of satellite under space flight conditions.
- 1977 March 29 — Investigation of the upper atmosphere and outer space.
- 1977 June 17 — Signe 3 - Twenty French specialists worked on the satellite.
- 1977 August 30 — Vertikal-5 Solar Ultraviolet/Solar X-ray mission.
- 1977 September 24 — Interkosmos 17 - Investigation of energetic charged and neutral particles and micrometeorite fluxes in circumterrestrial space.
- 1977 October 25 — Vertikal-6 Ionosphere/Solar mission.
- 1978 October 24 — Interkosmos 18 - Conduct of complex investigations on the interaction between the magnetosphere and ionosphere of the earth. Cooperation with the Czechoslovak Socialist Republic, the German Democratic Republic, the Hungarian People's Republic, the Polish People's Republic, and the Socialist Republic of Romania.
- 1978 October 24 — Magion 1 - The first Czechoslovak satellite of the Magion series was launched into orbit by the Soviet spacecraft Interkosmos 18
- 1978 November 3 — Vertikal-7 Ionosphere/Solar mission
- 1979 February 27 — Interkosmos 19 - Cooperation with the People's Republic of Bulgaria, the Czechoslovak Socialist Republic, the Hungarian People's Republic, and the Polish People's Republic.
- 1979 September 26 — Vertikal-8 Solar Ultraviolet/Solar X-ray mission.
- 1979 November 1 — Interkosmos 20. (Czechoslovak Socialist Republic, the German Democratic Republic, the Hungarian People's Republic, and the Socialist Republic of Romania).
- 1981 — Re-entry Vehicle Test mission.
- 1981 February 6 — Interkosmos 21 - (Czechoslovak Socialist Republic, the German Democratic Republic, the Hungarian People's Republic, and the Socialist Republic of Romania)
- 1981 August 7 — Interkosmos 22 "Bulgaria-1300" (People's Republic of Bulgaria).
- 1981 August 28 — Vertikal-9 Solar Ultraviolet/Solar X-ray mission.
- 1981 September 21 — Oreol 3 - Developed by Soviet and French specialists under the joint Soviet-French project 'Arkad-3'.
- 1985 April 26 — Interkosmos 23 - Developed by scientists and specialists of the USSR and the Czechoslovak Socialist Republic.
- 1986 December 18 — Kosmos 1809
- 1989 September 28 — Magion 2 - Part of the scientific programme of Interkosmos 24 (project Aktivnyj) Execution of the scientific programme of the 'Aktivny' project in conjunction with Interkosmos-24, permitting simultaneous spatially separating investigations of plasma processes in circumterrestrial space.
- 1989 September 28 — Interkosmos 24 - U.S. participation, in cooperation with Bulgaria, Czechoslovakia, the German Democratic Republic, Hungary, Poland, and Romania (the international scientific project entitled 'Aktivny'). Carrying the Czechoslovak Magion-2 satellite.
- 1991 December 18 — Interkosmos 25 - Experiments from Germany, Romania, Bulgaria, Poland, Hungary. Comprehensive study of the effects of artificial impact of modulated electron flows and plasma beams on the ionosphere and magnetosphere of the Earth (forming part of the Apex international scientific project, conducted jointly with Bulgaria, Czechoslovakia, Germany, Hungary, Poland, and Romania.)
- 1991 December 28 — Magion 3.
- 1994 March 2 — Interkosmos 26 - Conduct of comprehensive investigations of the sun under the Coronas-I international project developed by Russian and Ukrainian experiments in cooperation with specialists from Poland, the Czech Republic, the Slovak Republic, Bulgaria, France, and the United Kingdom.

== Legacy ==
Following the Apollo–Soyuz mission, there were talks between NASA and Interkosmos in the 1970s about a "Shuttle–Salyut" program to fly Space Shuttle missions to a Salyut space station, with later talks in the 1980s even considering flights of the future Buran-class orbiter to a future US space station. Whilst the Shuttle–Salyut program never materialized during the existence of the Soviet Interkosmos program, after the dissolution of the Soviet Union the Shuttle–Mir program would follow in these footsteps in the mid-1990s and eventually pave the way to the International Space Station.

== Films ==
In general, most of the films associated with programs are short TV documentaries from that era. The two exceptions include (largely fictionalised) Interkosmos from 2006, and cooperation document from 2009 (in Polish) titled Lotnicy Kosmonauci ("Aviators-Cosmonauts").

== See also ==
- Bion satellites, a series of biology research satellites from 1966 to 1996 – participation of the United States from 1975 to 1996.
- Vega 1 and Vega 2, two Solar System probes, in the joint Vega program between the Soviet Union, Austria, Bulgaria, Hungary, Poland, Czechoslovakia, France, the German Democratic Republic ("East Germany"), and the Federal Republic of Germany ("West Germany") in December 1984.
- An exhibition room in the German Space Travel Exhibition commemorates the 1978 joint USSR – GDR space flight. The exhibition is presented at the birth place of the first German cosmonaut, Sigmund Jähn, that is Morgenröthe-Rautenkranz in Saxony, Germany.
