= Valery Ryumin =

Soviet and Russian cosmonaut (1939–2022)

- Валерий Рюмин
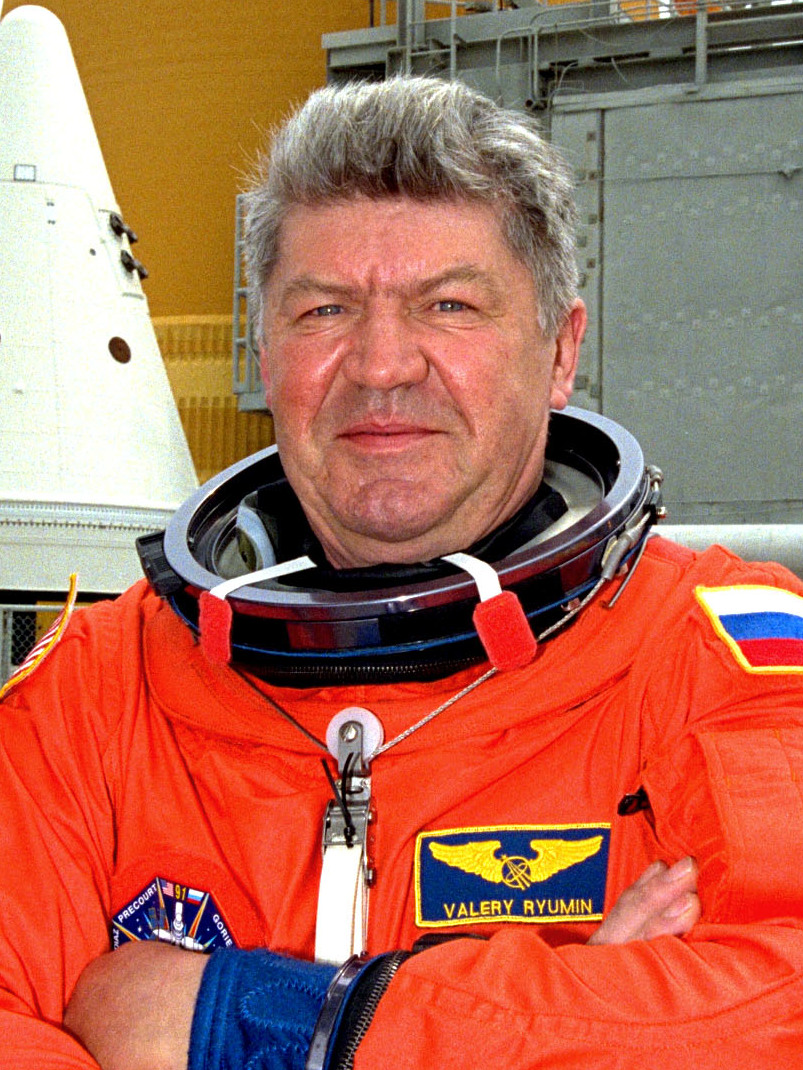
- Ryumin in 1998
- Born: 16 August 1939; Komsomolsk-on-Amur, Khabarovsk Krai, Russian SFSR, USSR
- Died: 6 June 2022 (aged 82); Russia
- Occupation: Flight engineer
- Space career

Cosmonaut
- Time in space: 371d 17h 24m
- Selection: 1973 Civilian Specialist Group 5
- Total EVAs: 1
- Total EVA time: 1 hour 23 minutes
- Missions: Soyuz 25 (failed docking with Salyut 6), Soyuz 32/Soyuz 34 (Salyut 6 EO-3), Soyuz 35/Soyuz 37 (Salyut 6 EO-4), STS-91

Valery Victorovich Ryumin (Russian: Валерий Викторович Рюмин; 16 August 1939 – 6 June 2022) was a Soviet cosmonaut.

== Biography ==
In 1958, he graduated from the Kaliningrad Mechanical Engineering Technical College with the specialty "Cold Working of Metal." In 1966, he graduated from the Department of Electronics and Computing Technology of the Moscow Forestry Engineering Institute with the specialty "Spacecraft Control Systems".

From 1958 to 1961, Ryumin served in the army as a tank commander.

From 1966 onwards he was employed at the Rocket Space Corporation Energia, holding the positions of Ground Electrical Test Engineer, Deputy Lead Designer for Orbital Stations, Department Head, and Deputy General Designer for Testing. He helped develop and prepare all orbital stations, beginning with Salyut 1.

In 1973, he joined the RSC Energia cosmonaut corps. Ultimately he became a veteran of four space flights and logged a total of 371 days in space.

In 1977, he spent two days aboard Soyuz 25, in 1979, he spent 175 days aboard Soyuz vehicles 32 and 34 and the Salyut 6 space station, and in 1980, he spent 185 days aboard Soyuz vehicles 35 and 37 and the Salyut 6 space station.

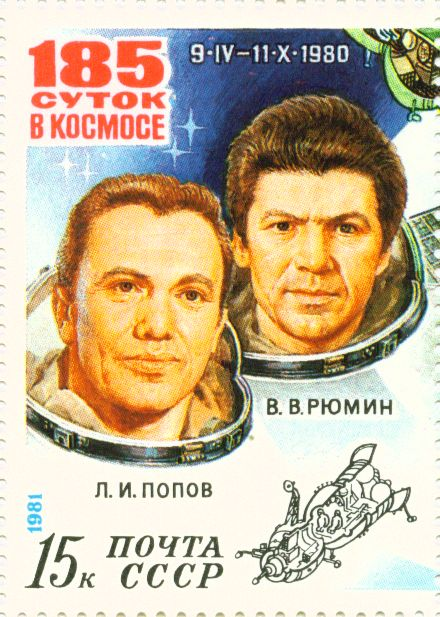
Leonid Popov and Valery Ryumin on USSR postage stamp, 1981

From 1981 to 1989, Ryumin was flight director for the Salyut 7 space station and the Mir space station. Since 1992, he was the Director of the Russian portion of the Shuttle-Mir and NASA-Mir program.

In January 1998, NASA announced Ryumin's selection to the crew of STS-91. Ryumin served aboard STS-91 Discovery (2–12 June 1998) the 9th and final Shuttle-Mir docking mission, concluding the joint U.S./Russian Phase I Program. The STS-91 mission was accomplished in 154 Earth orbits, traveling 3.8 million miles in 235 hours and 54 seconds.

Married to fellow cosmonaut Yelena Kondakova, he had two daughters and a son. His hobbies included tennis, angling, hunting, walking through forests, and travel.

Ryumin died on 6 June 2022, and was buried in the Federal Military Memorial Cemetery on 9 June.

== Awards ==
- Twice as Hero of the Soviet Union (19 August 1979 and 11 October 1980)
- Pilot-Cosmonaut of the USSR
- Order "For Merit to the Fatherland" 4th class
- Three Orders of Lenin (USSR)
- Medal "For Merit in Space Exploration"
- Hero of the Republic of Cuba
- Hero of Socialist Labour (Vietnam)
- Order of Ho Chi Minh (Vietnam)

== In popular culture ==
In the 2017 Russian film Salyut 7, a character Valery Shudin, played by Aleksandr Samoylenko, was based on Ryumin.

== Sources ==
- Biographical Data
- The official website of the city administration Baikonur - Honorary citizens of Baikonur
