= Viktor Gorbatko =

Soviet cosmonaut (1934–2017)

- Виктор Горбатко
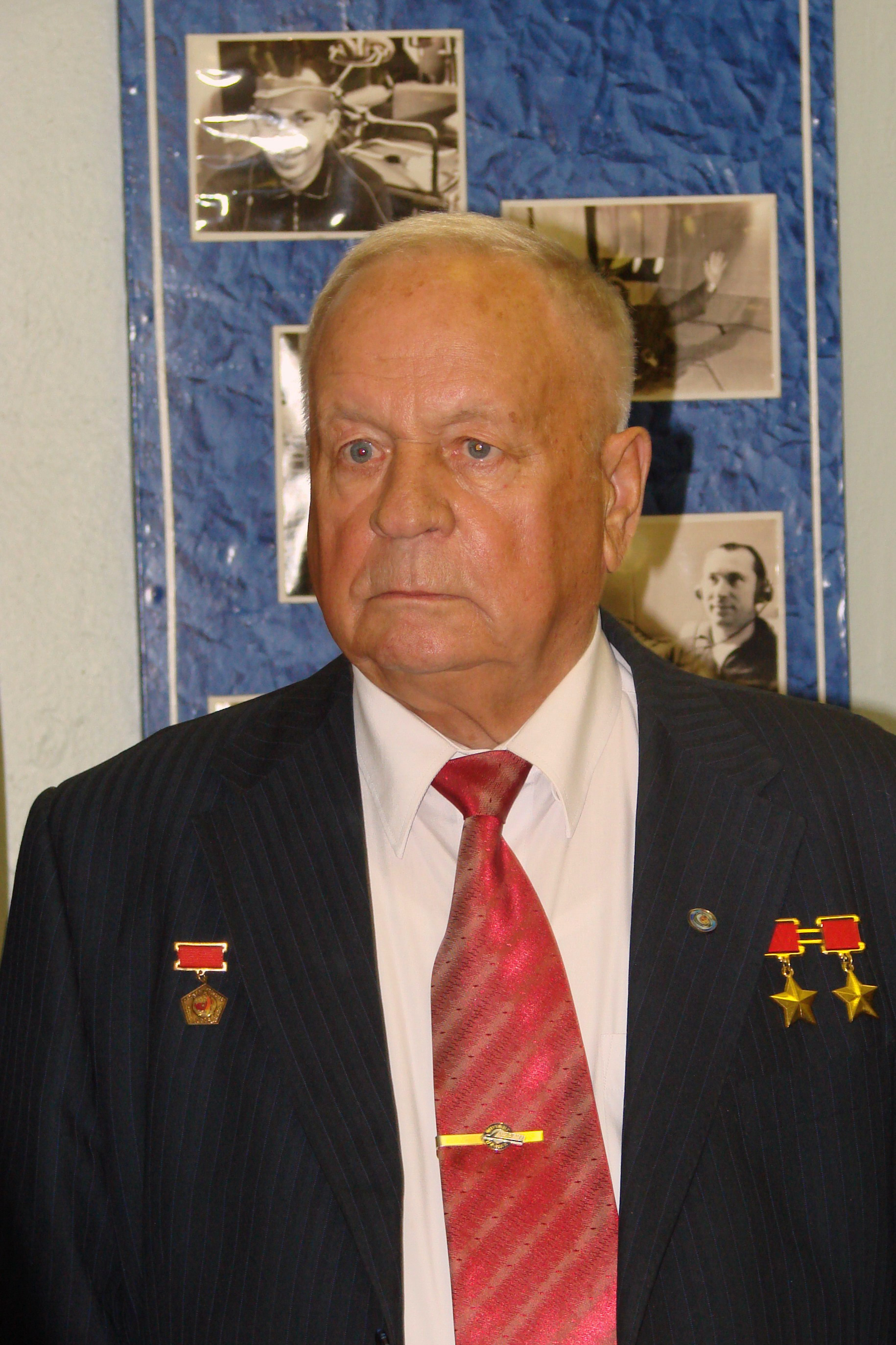
- Viktor Gorbatko in Vologda, 2011
- Born: Viktor Vasilyevich Gorbatko; 3 December 1934; Ventsy-Zarya, Azov-Black Sea Krai, Soviet Union
- Died: 17 May 2017 (aged 82); Moscow, Russia
- Resting place: Federal Military Memorial Cemetery, Moscow Oblast
- Occupation: Pilot
- Awards: Hero of the Soviet Union (2); Order of Lenin (3)
- Space career

Cosmonaut
- Rank: Major General, Soviet Air Force
- Time in space: 30d 12h 47m
- Selection: Air Force Group 1
- Missions: Soyuz 7, Soyuz 24, Soyuz 37/Soyuz 36

Viktor Vasilyevich Gorbatko (Russian: Ви́ктор Васи́льевич Горбатко́; 3 December 1934 – 17 May 2017) was a Soviet cosmonaut who flew on the Soyuz 7, Soyuz 24, and Soyuz 37 missions.

== Early life ==
Viktor Vasilievich Gorbatko was born on 3 December 1934 to Vasili Pavlovich and Matrena Aleksandrovna Gorbatko. Viktor was raised in the Northern Caucasus settlement of Ventsy-Zarya in the Gulkevich district. Gorbatko had four siblings, an older brother, Boris, two older sisters, Elena and Valentina, and Ludmila, the youngest sibling. Viktor was given the opportunity to learn from Nadezdha Karaulova who taught from ABC books that were often censored by the Nazis of everything that had to do with the Soviet histories. Viktor finished seventh grade in 1949 and then attended a secondary school in the Novokubanski district.

== Personal life and career ==
Viktor's interest in becoming a pilot was sparked during the conflict between the Soviets and the Nazis. His siblings often told him stories of brave pilots and their adventures and he too followed in their footsteps. Upon joining the Soviet Army in 1952, Viktor requested to be assigned to flight school. Following his enlisting, Viktor was sent to the 8th Military Aviation School of Pilot Basic Training in the Ukrainian town of Pavlograd, Dnepropetrovsk Region where he was taught to fly. Viktor graduated on 23 June 1956 as a lieutenant in the Soviet air force.

Gorbatko married his first wife Valentina Pavlovna Ordynskaya. Gorbatko also had two children, Irina his first daughter, and Marina, his second daughter, in 1960.

Gorbatko became part of the 86th Guards Fighter Regiment of the 119th Fighter Division, attached to the 48th Air Army operating out of the Odessa Military District in Moldavia. On 22 June 1957 Gorbatko achieved the rank of senior pilot. He would not achieve the senior lieutenant ranking until 6 August 1958, and in October would achieve the military pilots ranking, third class.

Gorbatko was among the first group of Soviet cosmonauts. He began training in early 1960 but he did not reach space until 1967. His first spaceflight was Soyuz 7 from 12 to 17 October 1969 where he was Research Engineer. This mission tested Soviet lunar equipment but a failed docking with Soyuz 8 was the last in-space test before that program was abandoned. Gorbatko was the commander of the 18-day Soyuz 24 mission in February 1977 to the Salyut 5 space station. This was the last all-military spaceflight by the Soviet Union. In 1980, Gorbatko commanded Soyuz 37 which also carried Phạm Tuân, the first Vietnamese astronaut. Gorbatko and Phạm Tuân flew to Salyut 6 and landed in the Soyuz 36 capsule that had earlier docked at the space station. Gorbatko spent 7 days and 20 hours in space on this mission.

After leaving the space program in 1982 he taught at the Air Force Engineering Academy in Moscow. Upon his death he was buried in the Federal Military Memorial Cemetery.

=== Awards ===
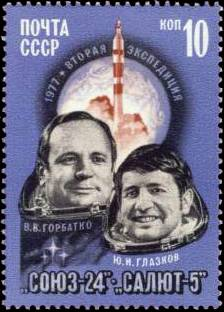
Viktor Gorbatko (left) and Yury Glazkov (right) on a 1977 U.S.S.R. postage stamp

His multiple Soviet and Russian Federation awards include:

- Twice Hero of the Soviet Union
- Pilot-Cosmonaut of the USSR
- Three Orders of Lenin
- Order of Friendship
- Order of the Red Star
- Medal "For Distinction in the Protection of the State Borders"
- Medal "For the Development of Virgin Lands"
- Jubilee Medal "50 Years of the Soviet Militia"

His foreign awards include:

- Hero of the Mongolian People's Republic
- Hero of Socialist Labour (Vietnam)
- Order of Sukhbaatar (Mongolia)
- Order of the Red Banner (Mongolia)
- Medal "50 Years of the Mongolian People's Revolution"
- Medal "60 Years of the Mongolian People's Revolution"
- Medal "50 Years of the Mongolian People's Army"
- Medal "60 Years of the Mongolian People's Army"
- Medal "40 years Khalkhin Gol Victory" (Mongolia)
- Medal "30 Years of Victory over Japan's Militarists" (Mongolia)
- Medal of Friendship (Mongolia)
- Medal "Brotherhood in Arms" (East Germany)
- Medal "Brotherhood in Arms" (Poland)
- Order of Ho Chi Minh (Vietnam)
