= List of human spaceflights, 1971–1980 =

This is a detailed list of human spaceflights from 1971 to 1980, including the later Apollo Moon landings, the US Skylab missions, and the start of the Soviet Union's Salyut series of space stations.

- Red indicates fatalities.
- Green indicates suborbital flights (including flights that failed to attain intended orbit).
- Grey indicates flights beyond low Earth orbit.

#	Crew	Launch spacecraft	Habitation	Return spacecraft	Brief mission summary
42	(United States) Alan B. Shepard (2) (United States) Stuart A. Roosa (United States) Edgar D. Mitchell	31 January 1971 (United States) Apollo 14	Moon	9 February 1971 (United States) Apollo 14	Third lunar landing. Shepard becomes only Mercury astronaut to walk on the Moon and hits a golf ball on the Moon's surface.
43	(Soviet Union) Vladimir Shatalov (3) (Soviet Union) Aleksei Yeliseyev (3) (Soviet Union) Nikolay Rukavishnikov (1)	23 April 1971 (Soviet Union) Soyuz 10		25 April 1971 (Soviet Union) Soyuz 10	Unsuccessful attempt to board Salyut 1 space station.
44	(Soviet Union) Georgy Dobrovolsky (Soviet Union) Viktor Patsayev (Soviet Union) Vladislav Volkov (2)	6 June 1971 (Soviet Union) Soyuz 11	Salyut 1	29 June 1971 (Soviet Union) Soyuz 11	Successful boarding of Salyut 1 (first crewed space station). All crew died on re-entry due to air leak.
45	(United States) David R. Scott (3) (United States) Alfred M. Worden (United States) James B. Irwin	26 July 1971 (United States) Apollo 15	Moon	7 August 1971 (United States) Apollo 15	Fourth lunar landing. First Lunar Rover. First deep space EVA.
46	(United States) John W. Young (4) (United States) Thomas K. Mattingly (1) (United States) Charles M. Duke	16 April 1972 (United States) Apollo 16	Moon	27 April 1972 (United States) Apollo 16	Fifth lunar landing. Second Lunar Rover. Second deep space EVA.
47	(United States) Eugene A. Cernan (3) (United States) Ronald E. Evans (United States) Harrison H. Schmitt	7 December 1972 (United States) Apollo 17	Moon	19 December 1972 (United States) Apollo 17	Sixth and last lunar landing. Third and last Lunar Rover. Third and last deep space EVA. Last crewed flight beyond low Earth orbit until 2026.
48	(United States) Charles P. Conrad (4) (United States) Paul J. Weitz (1) (United States) Joseph P. Kerwin	25 May 1973 (United States) Skylab 2	Skylab	22 June 1973 (United States) Skylab 2	First crewed mission to Skylab space station. Spent almost one month in space.
49	(United States) Alan L. Bean (2) (United States) Jack R. Lousma (1) (United States) Owen K. Garriott (1)	28 July 1973 (United States) Skylab 3	Skylab	25 September 1973 (United States) Skylab 3	Spent almost two months in space. Miscellaneous scientific experiments.
50	(Soviet Union) Vasili Lazarev (1) (Soviet Union) Oleg Makarov (1)	27 September 1973 (Soviet Union) Soyuz 12		29 September 1973 (Soviet Union) Soyuz 12	Test flight of new Soyuz design following Soyuz 11 disaster.
51	(United States) Gerald P. Carr (United States) William R. Pogue (United States) Edward G. Gibson	16 November 1973 (United States) Skylab 4	Skylab	8 February 1974 (United States) Skylab 4	Spent almost three months in space. Miscellaneous scientific experiments conducted.
52	(Soviet Union) Valentin Lebedev (1) (Soviet Union) Pyotr Klimuk (1)	18 December 1973 (Soviet Union) Soyuz 13		26 December 1973 (Soviet Union) Soyuz 13	Second test of redesigned Soyuz capsule. Astrophysical observations.
53	(Soviet Union) Yuri Artyukhin (Soviet Union) Pavel Popovich (2)	3 July 1974 (Soviet Union) Soyuz 14	Salyut 3	19 July 1974 (Soviet Union) Soyuz 14	Military mission. Evaluation of military applications of human spaceflight.
54	(Soviet Union) Lev Demin (Soviet Union) Gennadi Sarafanov	26 August 1974 (Soviet Union) Soyuz 15		28 August 1974 (Soviet Union) Soyuz 15	Failed to board Salyut 3 space station.
55	(Soviet Union) Anatoly Filipchenko (2) (Soviet Union) Nikolay Rukavishnikov (2)	2 December 1974 (Soviet Union) Soyuz 16		8 December 1974 (Soviet Union) Soyuz 16	Systems testing in preparation for joint Soviet-US space flight.
56	(Soviet Union) Georgy Grechko (1) (Soviet Union) Aleksei Gubarev (1)	11 January 1975 (Soviet Union) Soyuz 17	Salyut 4	10 February 1975 (Soviet Union) Soyuz 17	Astronomical observations.
57	(Soviet Union) Vasili Lazarev (2) (Soviet Union) Oleg Makarov (2)	5 April 1975 (Soviet Union) Soyuz 18a			Failed to reach orbit due to malfunction.
58	(Soviet Union) Pyotr Klimuk (2) (Soviet Union) Vitali Sevastyanov (2)	24 May 1975 (Soviet Union) Soyuz 18	Salyut 4	26 July 1975 (Soviet Union) Soyuz 18	Research into long-term stays in space.
59	(Soviet Union) Alexei Leonov (2) (Soviet Union) Valeri Kubasov (2)	15 July 1975 (Soviet Union) Soyuz 19		21 July 1975 (Soviet Union) Soyuz 19	Apollo–Soyuz Test Project (ASTP); first joint Soviet–US spaceflight. The two craft dock in space with exchange of flags and gifts. Last crewed US mission until STS-1 in 1981.
60	(United States) Thomas P. Stafford (4) (United States) Vance D. Brand (1) (United States) Donald K. Slayton	15 July 1975 (United States) Apollo–Soyuz		24 July 1975 (United States) Apollo–Soyuz	Apollo–Soyuz Test Project (ASTP); first joint Soviet–US spaceflight. The two craft dock in space with exchange of flags and gifts. Last crewed US mission until STS-1 in 1981.
61	(Soviet Union) Boris Volynov (2) (Soviet Union) Vitaliy Zholobov	6 July 1976 (Soviet Union) Soyuz 21	Salyut 5	24 August 1976 (Soviet Union) Soyuz 21	Assessment of Salyut 5 station's military surveillance capabilities.
62	(Soviet Union) Valery Bykovsky (2) (Soviet Union) Vladimir Aksyonov (1)	15 September 1976 (Soviet Union) Soyuz 22		23 September 1976 (Soviet Union) Soyuz 22	Earth photography.
63	(Soviet Union) Vyacheslav Zudov (Soviet Union) Valery Rozhdestvensky	14 October 1976 (Soviet Union) Soyuz 23		16 October 1976 (Soviet Union) Soyuz 23	Failed to board Salyut 5 space station.
64	(Soviet Union) Viktor Gorbatko (2) (Soviet Union) Yuri Glazkov	7 February 1977 (Soviet Union) Soyuz 24	Salyut 5	25 February 1977 (Soviet Union) Soyuz 24	Investigation of air quality on board Salyut 5.
65	(Soviet Union) Vladimir Kovalyonok (1) (Soviet Union) Valeri Ryumin (1)	9 October 1977 (Soviet Union) Soyuz 25		11 October 1977 (Soviet Union) Soyuz 25	Failed to board Salyut 6 space station.
66	(Soviet Union) Georgy Grechko (2) (Soviet Union) Yuri Romanenko (1)	10 December 1977 (Soviet Union) Soyuz 26	Salyut 6	16 March 1978 (Soviet Union) Soyuz 27	First successful docking with Salyut 6.
67	(Soviet Union) Vladimir Dzhanibekov (1) (Soviet Union) Oleg Makarov (3)	10 January 1978 (Soviet Union) Soyuz 27	Salyut 6	16 January 1978 (Soviet Union) Soyuz 26	
68	(Soviet Union) Aleksey Gubarev (2) (Czechoslovakia) Vladimír Remek	2 March 1978 (Soviet Union) Soyuz 28	Salyut 6	10 March 1978 (Soviet Union) Soyuz 28	First Czech astronaut and first astronaut not from USA or USSR (Remek).
69	(Soviet Union) Vladimir Kovalyonok (2) (Soviet Union) Aleksandr Ivanchenkov (1)	15 June 1978 (Soviet Union) Soyuz 29	Salyut 6	2 November 1978 (Soviet Union) Soyuz 31	Salyut 6 crew rotation.
70	(Soviet Union) Pyotr Klimuk (3) (Poland) Mirosław Hermaszewski	27 June 1978 (Soviet Union) Soyuz 30	Salyut 6	5 July 1978 (Soviet Union) Soyuz 30	Life sciences experiments. Earth observations and study of aurora borealis. First Pole in space (Hermaszewski).
71	(Soviet Union) Valery Bykovsky (3) (East Germany) Sigmund Jähn	26 August 1978 (Soviet Union) Soyuz 31	Salyut 6	3 September 1978 (Soviet Union) Soyuz 29	First East German in space (Jähn).
72	(Soviet Union) Vladimir Lyakhov (1) (Soviet Union) Valeri Ryumin (2)	25 February 1979 (Soviet Union) Soyuz 32	Salyut 6	19 August 1979 (Soviet Union) Soyuz 34	Salyut 6 crew rotation.
73	(Soviet Union) Nikolay Rukavishnikov (3) (Bulgaria) Georgi Ivanov	10 April 1979 (Soviet Union) Soyuz 33		12 April 1979 (Soviet Union) Soyuz 33	Failed to board Salyut 6 space station. First Bulgarian in space (Ivanov).
74	(Soviet Union) Leonid Popov (1) (Soviet Union) Valeri Ryumin (3)	9 April 1980 (Soviet Union) Soyuz 35	Salyut 6	11 October 1980 (Soviet Union) Soyuz 37	Salyut 6 crew rotation.
75	(Soviet Union) Valeri Kubasov (3) (Hungary) Bertalan Farkas	26 May 1980 (Soviet Union) Soyuz 36	Salyut 6	3 June 1980 (Soviet Union) Soyuz 35	Materials processing, Earth observation and life sciences experiments. First Hungarian in space (Farkas).
76	(Soviet Union) Yury Malyshev (1) (Soviet Union) Vladimir Aksyonov (2)	5 June 1980 (Soviet Union) Soyuz T-2	Salyut 6	9 June 1980 (Soviet Union) Soyuz T-2	First crewed flight of the Soyuz T.
77	(Soviet Union) Viktor Gorbatko (3) (Vietnam) Pham Tuân	23 July 1980 (Soviet Union) Soyuz 37	Salyut 6	31 July 1980 (Soviet Union) Soyuz 36	Miscellaneous scientific experiments. First Vietnamese and first Asian outside USSR in space (Tuan).
78	(Soviet Union) Yuri Romanenko (2) (Cuba) Arnaldo Tamayo-Mendez	18 September 1980 (Soviet Union) Soyuz 38	Salyut 6	26 September 1980 (Soviet Union) Soyuz 38	First Cuban and first black person in space (Tamayo-Mendez).
79	(Soviet Union) Leonid Kizim (1) (Soviet Union) Oleg Makarov (4) (Soviet Union) Gennadi Strekalov (1)	27 November 1980 (Soviet Union) Soyuz T-3	Salyut 6	10 December 1980 (Soviet Union) Soyuz T-3	Salyut 6 refurbishment.

== See also ==
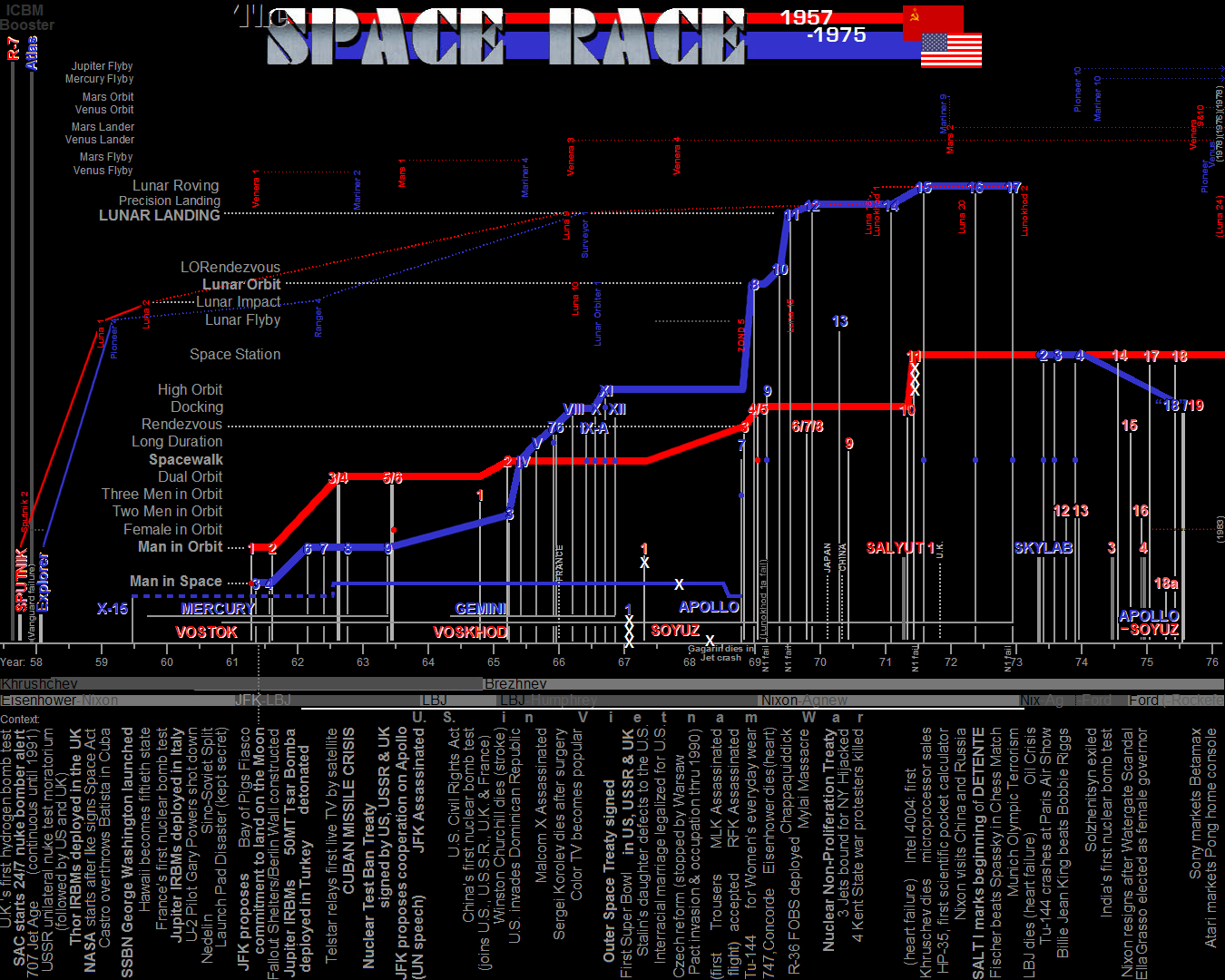
A chart showing relative accomplishments in human spaceflights (along with probes) visually graphing how the U.S. had far surpassed the Soviet Union in the 1970s with lunar missions, yet lagged years behind in space station activity.

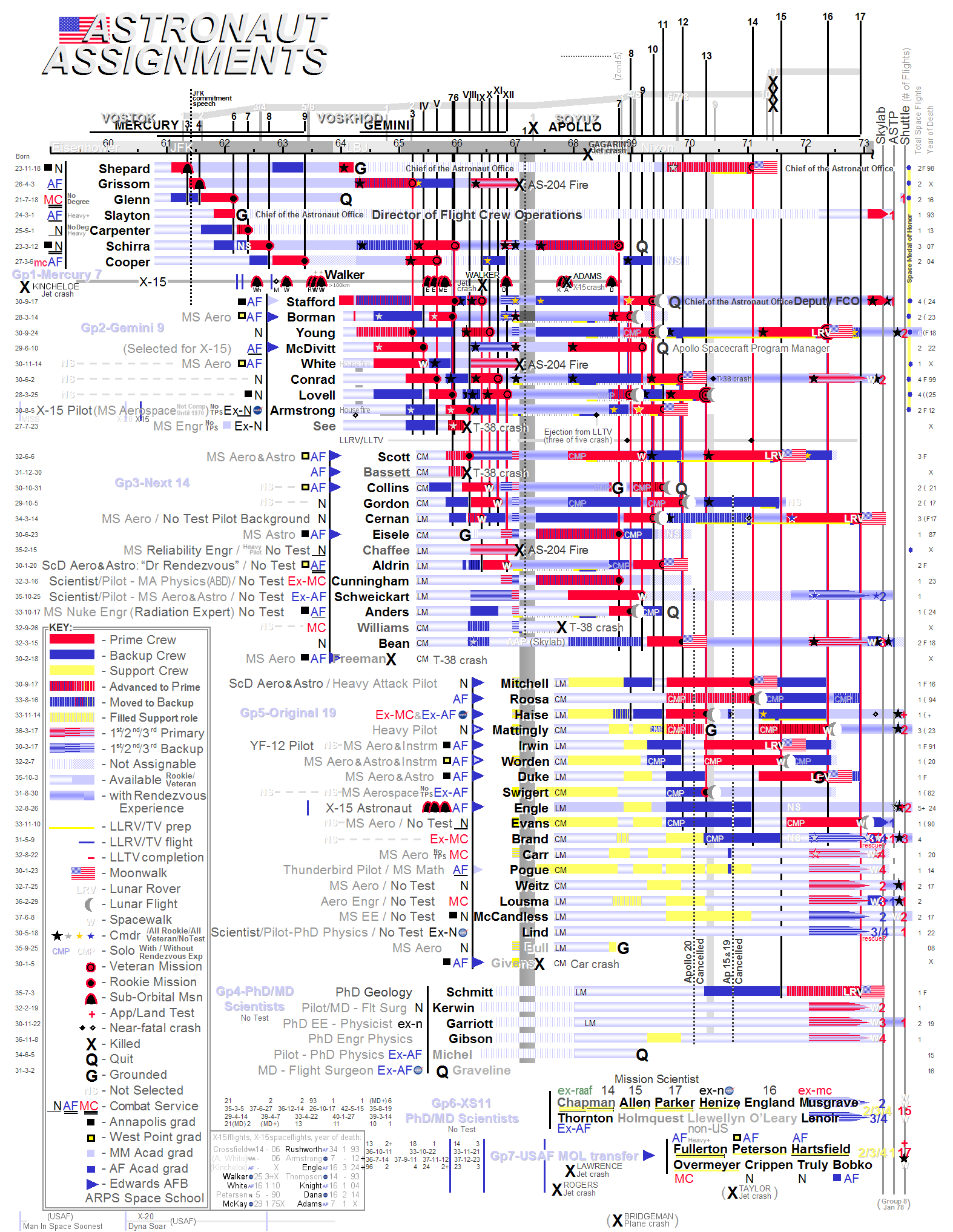
A chart showing U.S. astronaut assignments during the 1970s as graduated from the Mercury and Gemini programs.

- List of human spaceflight programs
- List of human spaceflights
- List of human spaceflights, 1961–1970
- List of human spaceflights, 1981–1990
- List of human spaceflights, 1991–2000
- List of human spaceflights, 2001–2010
- List of human spaceflights, 2011–2020
- List of human spaceflights, 2021–present
