= List of crewed spacecraft =

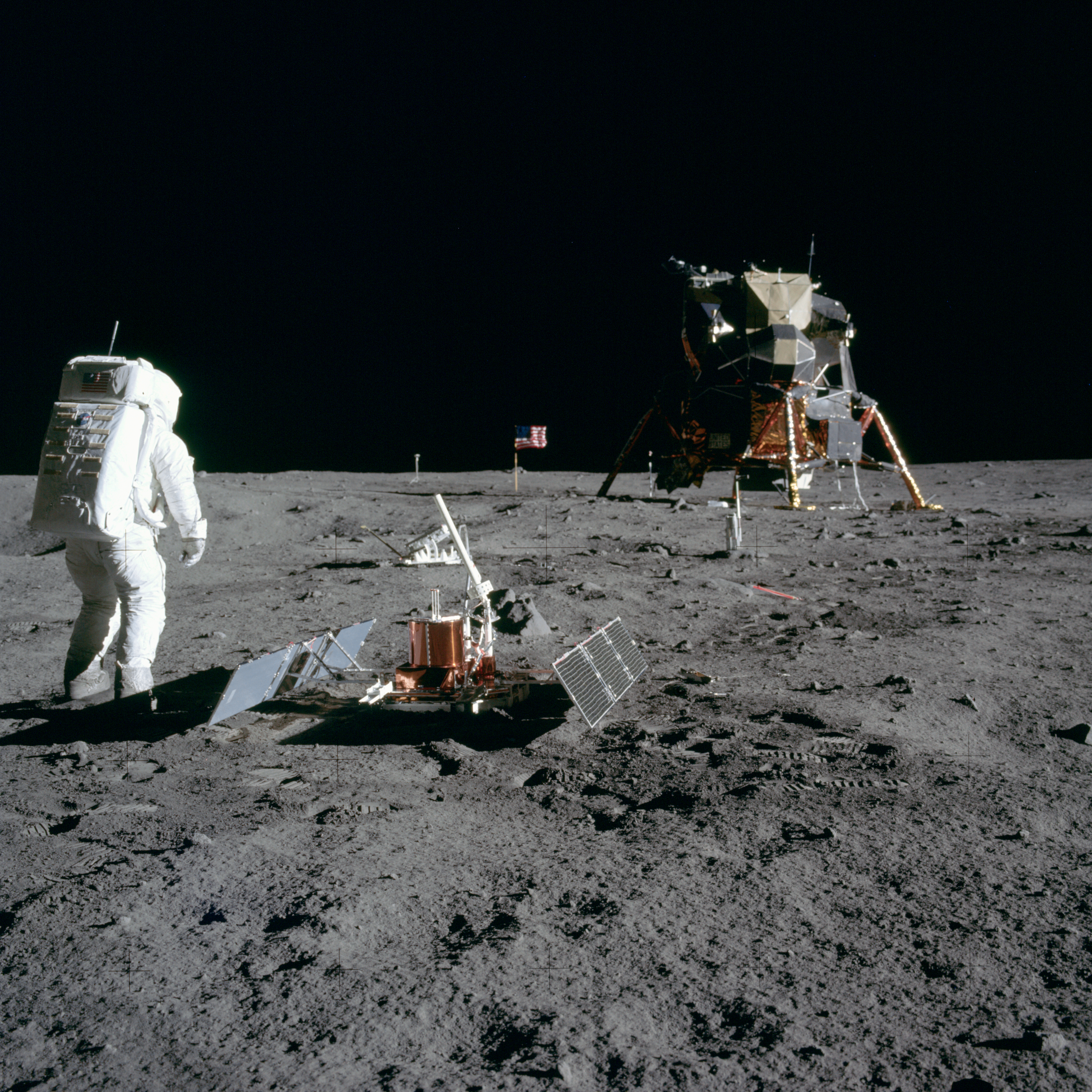
Apollo 11 Lunar Module Eagle was the first crewed spacecraft to land on the Moon (July 20, 1969).

This is a list of all crewed spacecraft types that have flown into space, including sub-orbital flights above 80 km, space stations that have been visited by at least one crew member, and spacecraft currently planned to operate with crews in the future. It does not contain crewed flights by spacecraft below 80 km. There is some debate concerning the height at which space is reached (the Karman Line): the Fédération Aéronautique Internationale (FAI) recognizes 100 km, while NASA and the USAF recognize this as 50 miles (approx 80 km).

Since the first crewed spaceflight of Vostok 1 in 1961 there have been 14 types of spacecraft that have made crewed flights into space – ten American, three Russian, and one Chinese. There are currently six operational crewed spacecraft, which form the first part of the list below; the eight retired spacecraft types are listed in the next section; and crewed spacecraft currently in development are listed last. Space stations are listed beneath each appropriate section, dates of operation reflect when the first and last crews visited, not when they were launched and deorbited. There are currently two space stations in orbit around Earth, the International Space Station and the Chinese Tiangong space station.

Crewed spacecraft are designed to support human life for the human spaceflight portion of the mission. Spacecraft for human spaceflight must have a human-rating certification as fit for purpose. Crewed spacecraft must have a pressurized, breathable atmosphere (usually between 345 mbar and 1 bar (1 atmosphere)) and be temperature-regulated (usually 20 to 24 °C (68 to 75 °F)). Crewed spacecraft include space capsules, spaceplanes, and space stations.

== Currently operational crewed spacecraft ==
=== Soyuz (1967) ===
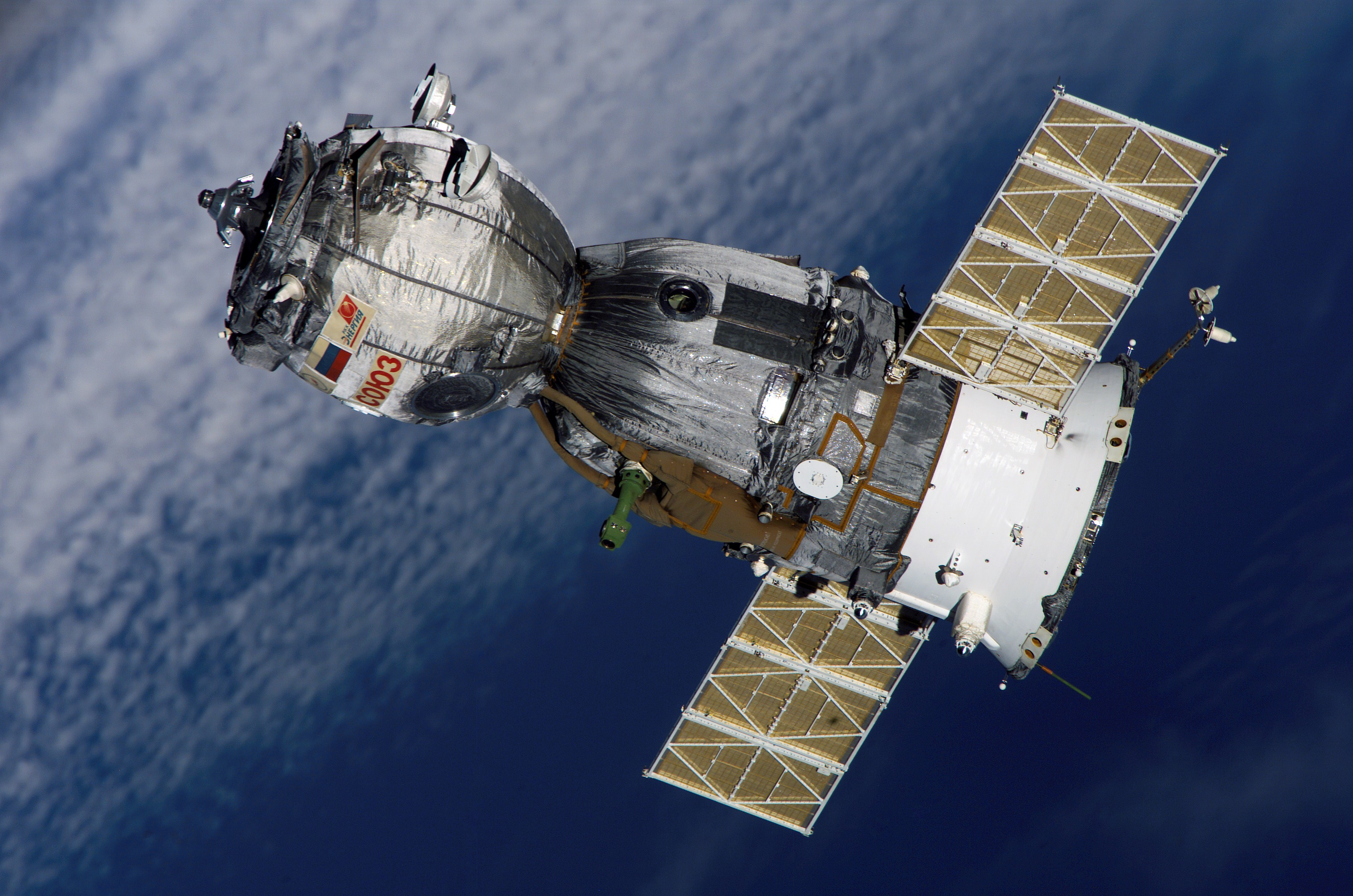
Soyuz-TMA spacecraft

Russian three person Earth orbital spacecraft; Early versions were operated by the Soviet Union and later versions by Russia after 1991. Soyuz has completed over 150 crewed spaceflights, including two emergency sub-orbital flights: Soyuz 18a and Soyuz MS-10. There have been two spacecraft losses resulting in the deaths of four cosmonauts, Soyuz 1 and Soyuz 11. Soyuz is the only spacecraft to have successfully saved the lives of a crew using the rocket launch escape system, when in 1983 Soyuz T-10-1 exploded on the launchpad. This spacecraft type has flown into space more times than any other spacecraft.

=== Shenzhou (2003) ===
Chinese three-person Earth orbital spacecraft. Shenzhou is China's first crewed spacecraft. On 15 October 2003, Yang Liwei was carried into space by Shenzhou 5 becoming China's first astronaut. The spacecraft has gone on to fly crews to China's Tiangong-1 and Tiangong-2 space labs. Since Jun 2021, Shenzhou has been used as the vehicle to send crews to China's new modular Tiangong space station and back. As of December 2023, Shenzhou has made 12 successful crewed spaceflights.

=== Crew Dragon (2020) ===
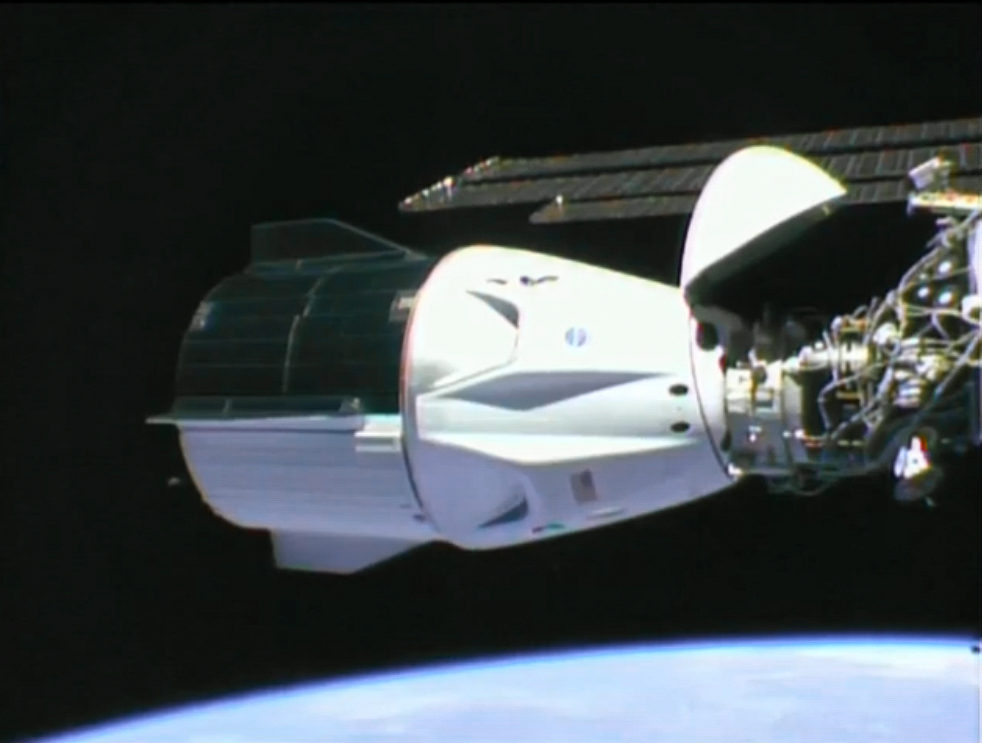
Crew Dragon Endeavour docked with the International Space Station

United States four-person (initially seven) Earth orbital spacecraft designed by SpaceX to transport astronauts to the International Space Station under the NASA Commercial Crew Contract (CCDev). As of April 2025, Crew Dragon has made 17 crewed spaceflights. The first crewed flight, Crew Dragon Demo-2, launched on 30 May 2020 and returned to Earth on 2 August 2020. This was the first time an American spacecraft had sent astronauts to orbit since the final Space Shuttle flight in July 2011. The first operational flight of the Crew Dragon launched on 15 November 2020 with SpaceX Crew-1.

=== New Shepard (2021) ===
New Shepard is a six-person capsule for suborbital space tourism in the United States. It is launched by a reusable booster and can fly with or without crew. Uncrewed flights started in 2015. The first crewed test flight flew on 20 July 2021. As of December 2023 there have been 24 flights, including six crewed flights carrying a total of 32 passengers into space.

=== Starliner (2024) ===
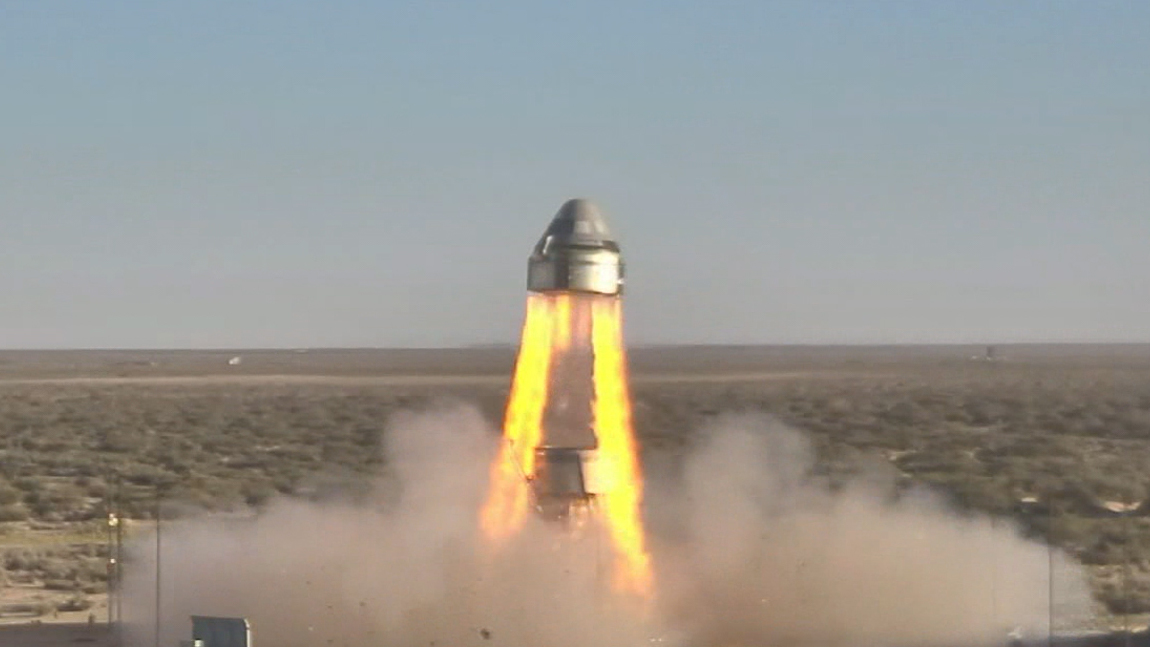
Starliner performing a pad abort test in 2019

The Boeing CST-100 Starliner is a United States five-person (initially seven) Earth orbital spacecraft designed to transport astronauts to the International Space Station under the NASA Commercial Crew Program. Following several technical problems 1 on the first uncrewed test flight in December 2019, a second uncrewed test flight launched in May 2022. The following crewed flight test (CFT) launched in June 2024, carrying astronauts Suni Williams and Butch Wilmore to the International Space Station. After experiencing thruster issues during its approach and docking, the astronauts successfully completed their mission at the ISS and departed the station. Due to ongoing assessments and mission adjustments, the Starliner landed uncrewed. The Crew-9 mission, carrying astronauts Nick Hague, Suni Williams, Butch Wilmore, and cosmonaut Aleksandr Gorbunov, splashed down in the Gulf of Mexico off the coast of Florida on March 18, 2025. This landing marked the end of a long space saga for Williams and Wilmore, who arrived at the ISS aboard the Starliner.

=== Orion (2026) ===
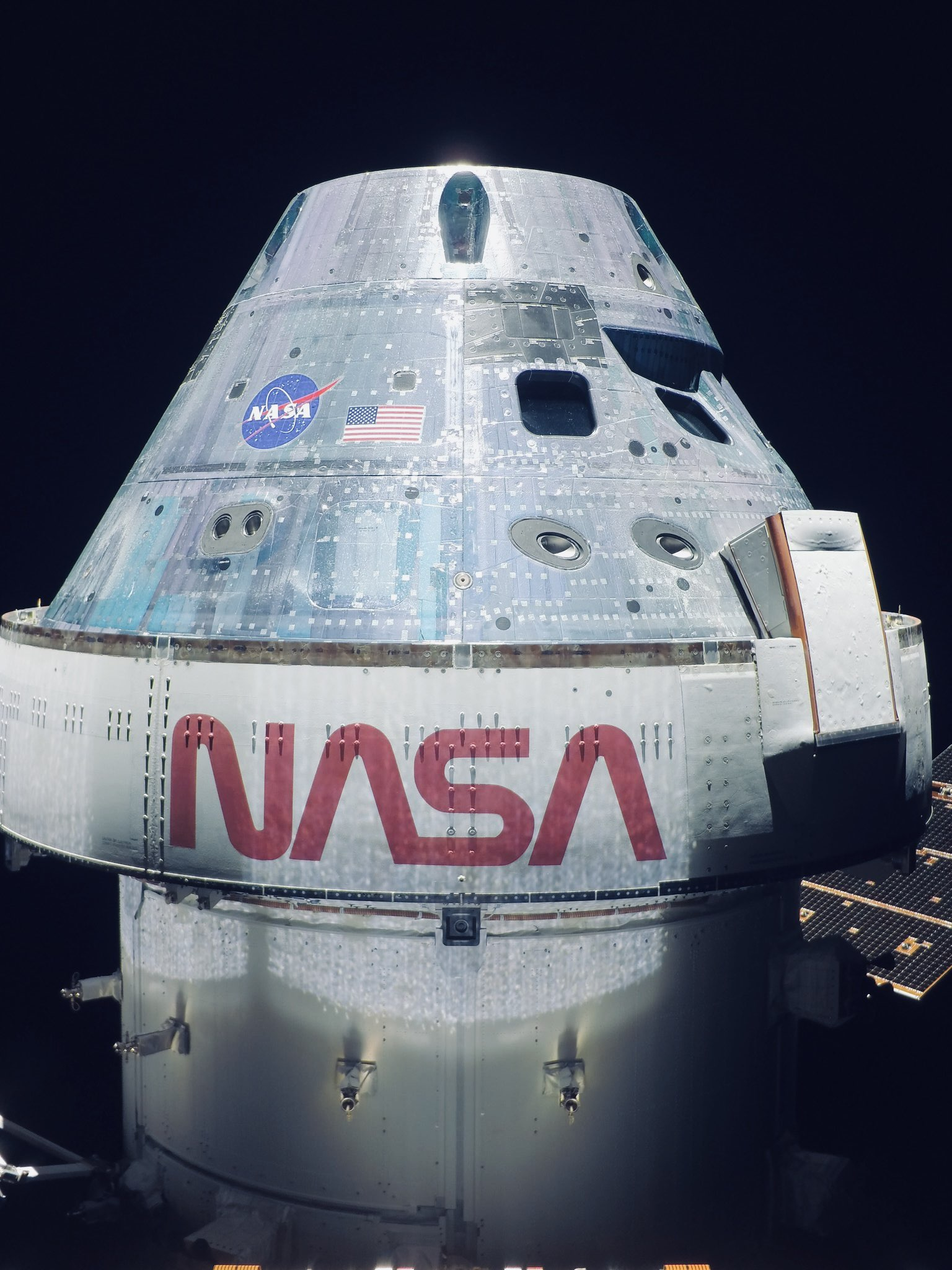
Photo of Orion taken during the flight of Artemis I

A spacecraft capable of lunar missions with a crew of four, used as part of NASA's Artemis program. Consisting of two components – a Crew Module (CM) manufactured by Lockheed Martin, and a European Service Module (ESM) manufactured by Airbus Defence and Space – the spacecraft are designed to support crewed exploration beyond low Earth orbit. Orion is equipped with solar power, an automated docking system, and glass cockpit interfaces modeled after those used in the Boeing 787 Dreamliner, and can support a crew of six in low Earth orbit and a crew of four in lunar orbit, up to 21 days undocked and up to six months docked. A single AJ10 engine provides the spacecraft's primary propulsion, while eight R-4D-11 engines and six pods of custom reaction control system (RCS) engines developed by Airbus provide the spacecraft's secondary propulsion. Although compatible with other launch vehicles, Orion is primarily designed to launch atop the Space Launch System (SLS) rocket. The first mission on that flew a fully configured Orion spacecraft and service module was Artemis I. This flight, however, was not a crewed mission and served the purpose of testing the systems of the spacecraft in the environment it was designed for. Orion's first crewed mission was Artemis II, which launched on April 1, 2026, and slingshotted around the Moon without entering orbit. The following crewed Artemis III flight is planned for 2027 and will be a low Earth orbit docking test. Artemis IV, planned for 2028, will see a crewed Orion enter lunar orbit, docking with a lunar lander.

== Currently operational space stations ==
=== International Space Station (ISS) (1998) ===
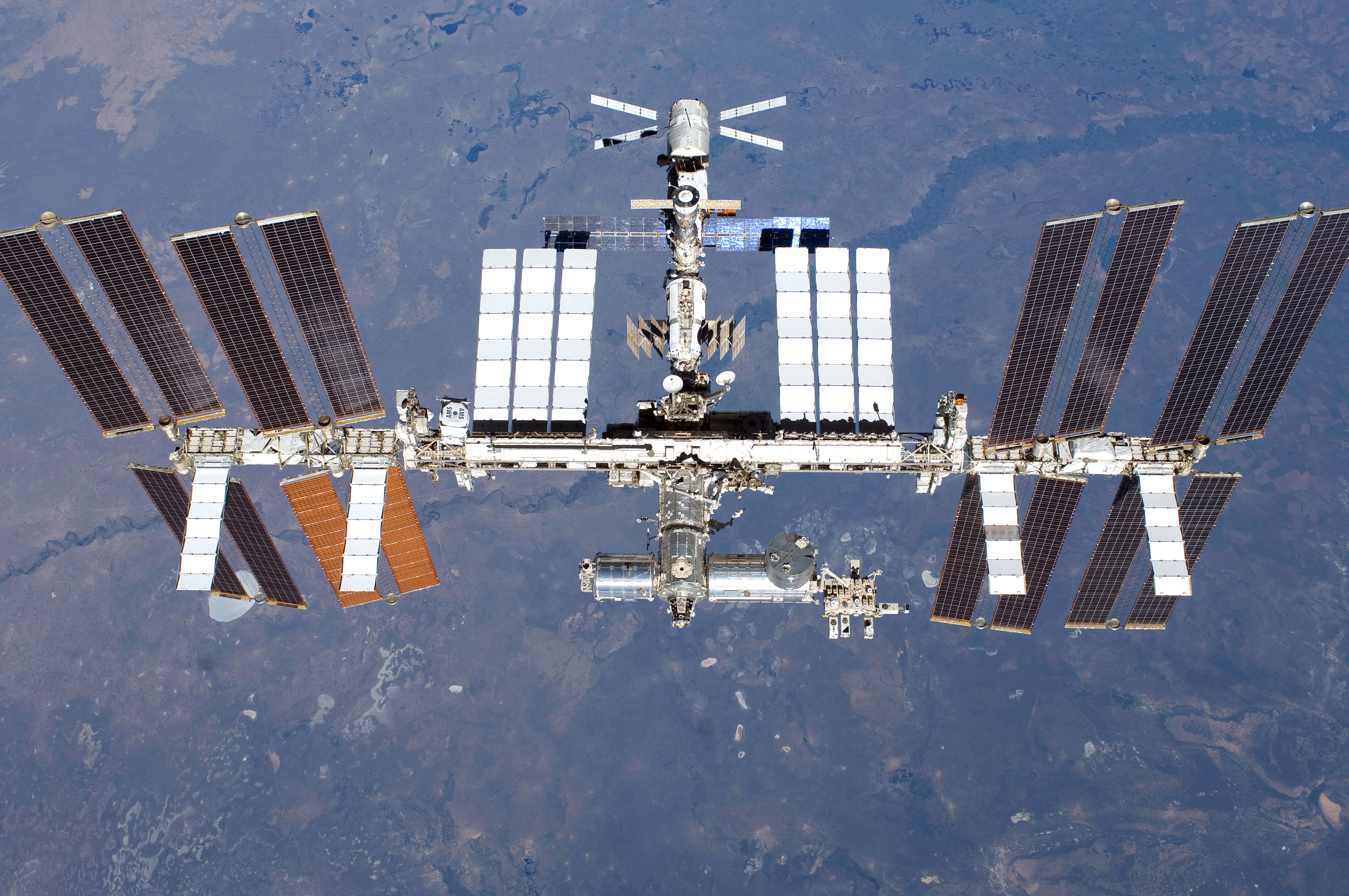
International Space Station

Multinational low Earth orbit modular space station. The International Space Station is a joint project among five participating space agencies: NASA, Roscosmos, JAXA, European Space Agency (ESA), and Canadian Space Agency (CSA). Following the uncrewed initial assembly from 1998 to 2000, it has been continuously crewed since November 2000. As of 4 March 2024, ISS has been visited by 111 crewed spacecraft (68 Soyuz, 35 Space Shuttle, and 9 Crew Dragon). The ISS is the largest space station yet constructed. It is planned to operate until 2028, with a possible extension to 2030.

=== Tiangong Space Station (2021) ===
Chinese low Earth orbit modular space station. The Tianhe core module was launched on 29 April 2021. The first crewed flight Shenzhou 12 with 3 astronauts arrived at the station in June 2021. The space station has three modules: the Tianhe core module, and two Laboratory Cabin Modules. The Wentian module docked with the station on 24 July 2022, and the Mengtian module docked on 31 October 2022.

== Former crewed spacecraft ==
=== Vostok (1961–1963) ===
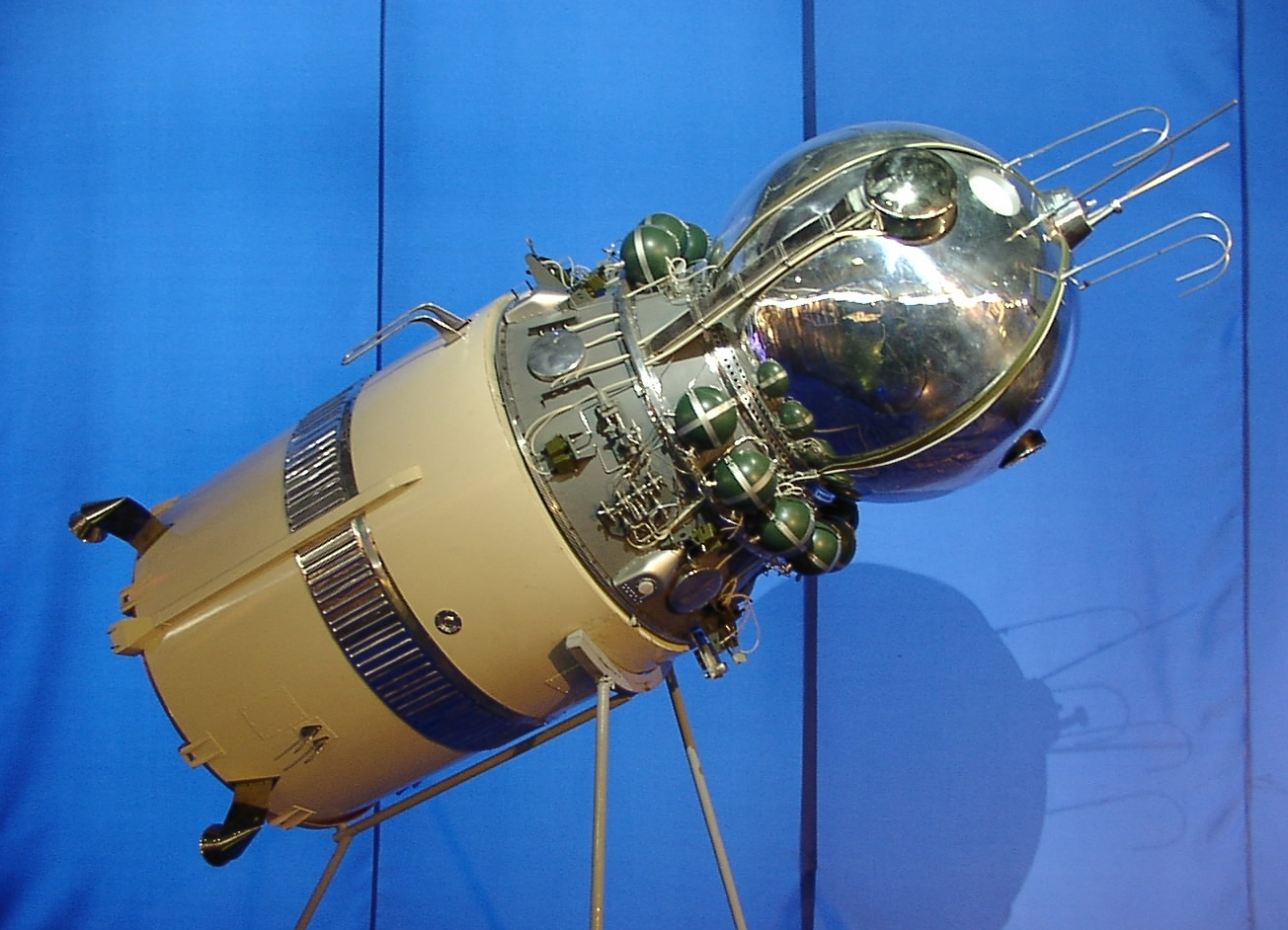
Vostok spacecraft

Soviet single-person Earth orbital spacecraft 6 flights. On 12 April 1961 Vostok 1 carried the first human into space, Cosmonaut Yuri Gagarin. On 16 June 1963, Vostok 6 carried the first woman into space, Cosmonaut Valentina Tereshkova.

=== Mercury (1961–1963) ===
United States single-person Earth orbital spacecraft 6 flights (including 2 sub-orbital). Mercury was the United States first crewed spacecraft. On 5 May 1961 Mercury-Redstone 3 carried the first American, Alan Shepard, into space on a sub-orbital flight. On 20 February 1962, Mercury-Atlas 6 carried the first American, John Glenn, into Earth orbit.

=== X-15 (1962–1968) ===
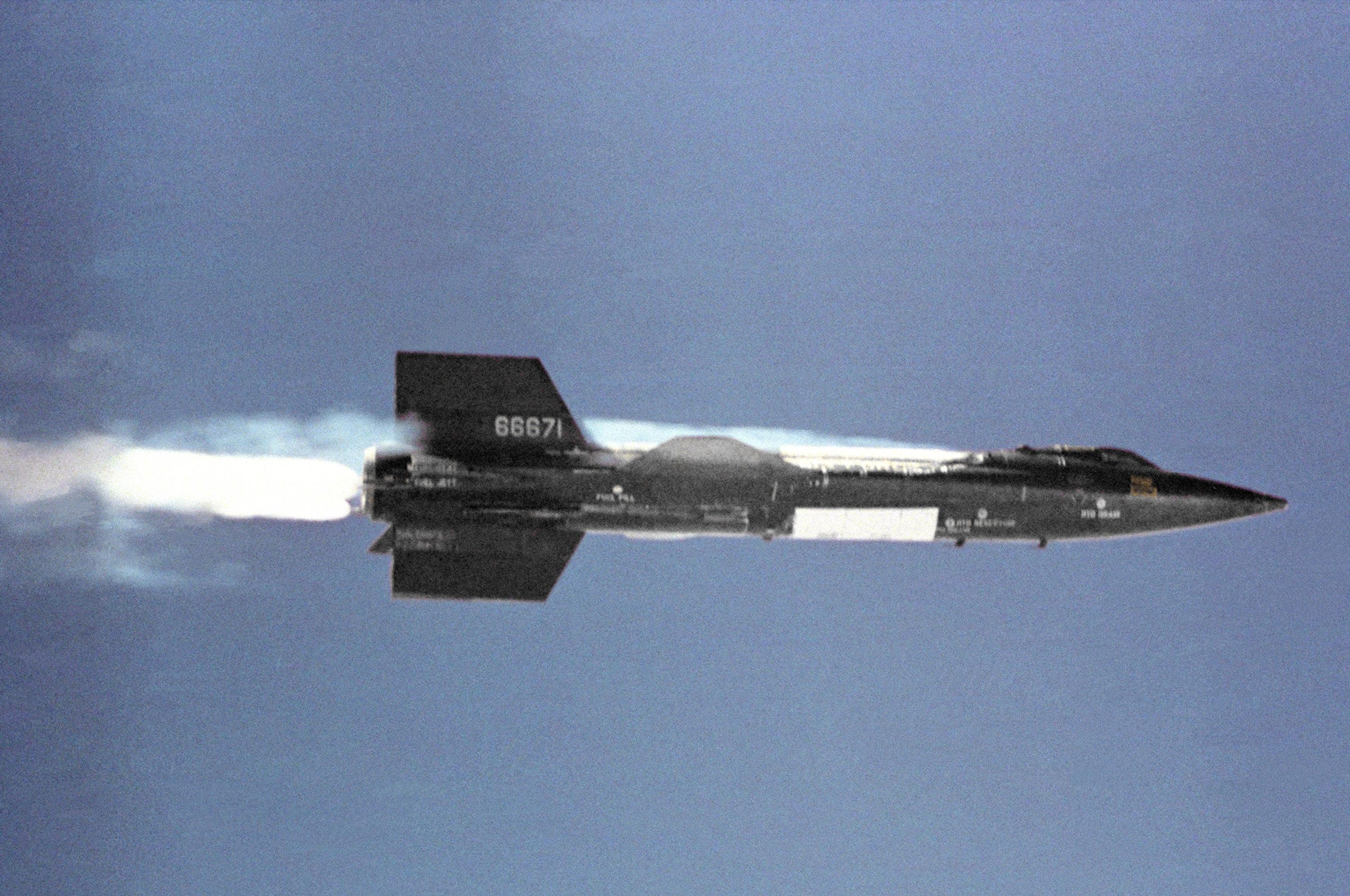
X-15

United States single seat, air-launched sub-orbital spaceplane; two X-15 flights above the 100 km Kármán line occurred in 1963, an additional 11 flights between 1962 and 1968 reached altitudes between 80 and 100 km which were recognized as spaceflights by U.S. authorities.

=== Voskhod (1964–1965) ===
Soviet three person Vostok derivative made 2 flights. On 18 March 1965, Alexei Leonov performed the first spacewalk in history, from Voskhod 2.

=== Gemini (1965–1966) ===
United States two person Earth orbital spacecraft which made 10 flights. On 3 June 1965, Ed White made America's first spacewalk during Gemini 4.

=== Apollo (1968–1975) ===
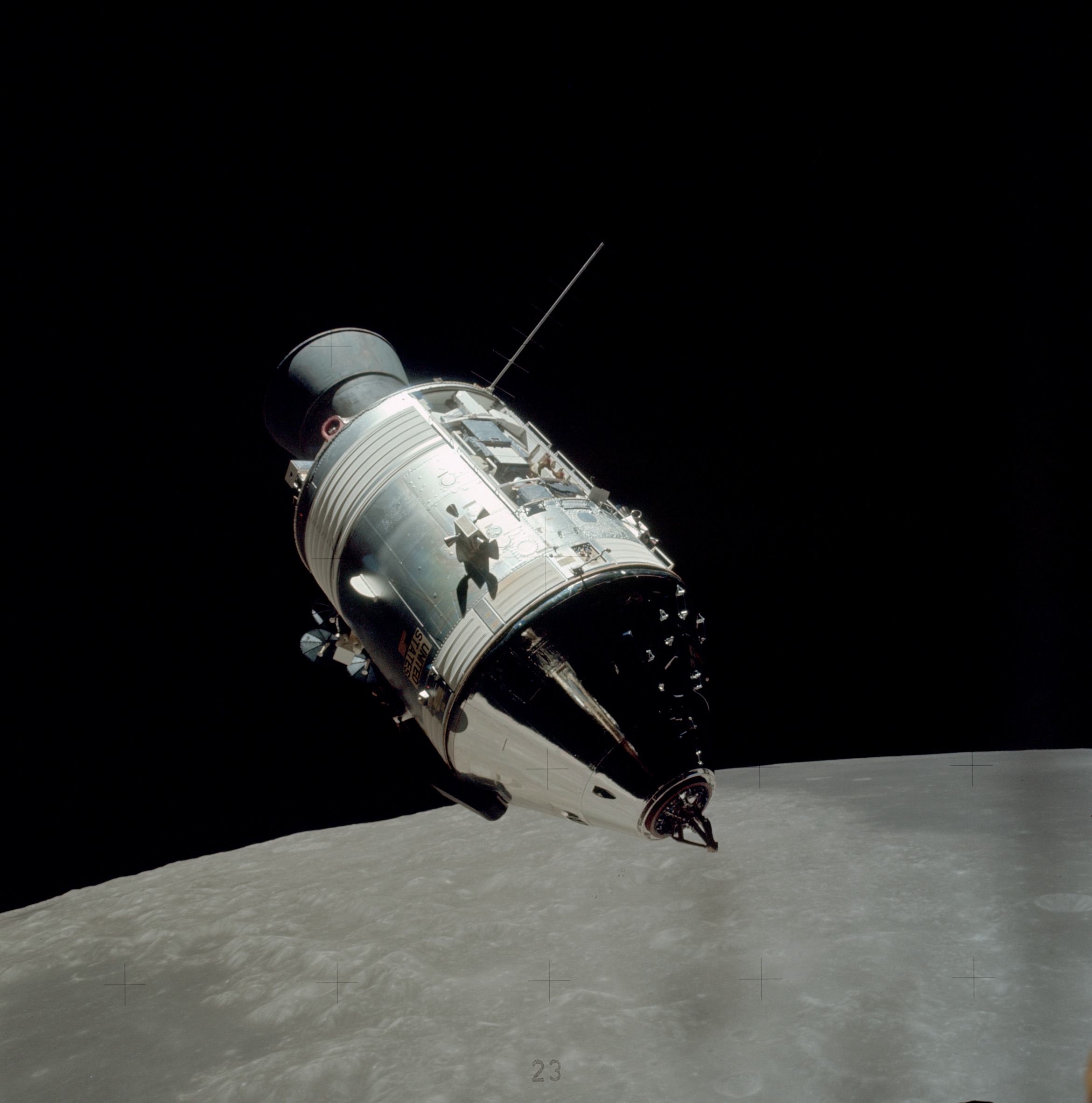
Apollo 17 CSM orbiting the Moon

United States three-person lunar-capable spacecraft. 15 flights; including nine lunar missions (with six lunar landings). It was the Apollo spacecraft that enabled America to win the Space Race. In December 1968, Apollo 8 was the first crewed spacecraft to orbit the Moon. On 21 July 1969, Neil Armstrong, the Commander of Apollo 11, and Buzz Aldrin became the first men to walk on the Moon. The Apollo Spacecraft consisted of:

- The Apollo command and service module (1968–1975), three-person Earth and lunar orbital craft
- The Apollo Lunar Module (1969–1972), two-person lunar lander

=== Space Shuttle (1981–2011) ===
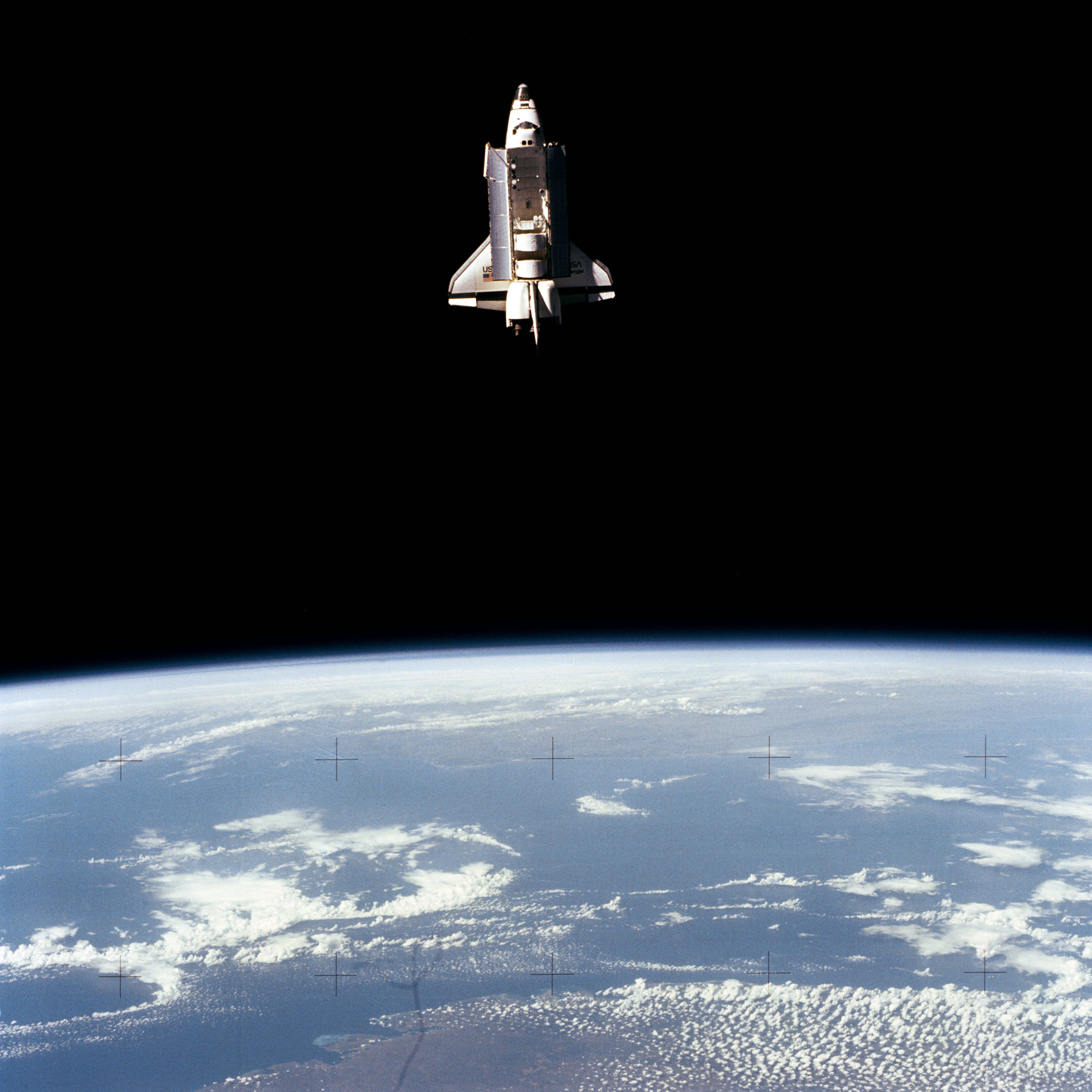
Space Shuttle Challenger in orbit

United States eight person Earth orbital spacecraft; first orbit-capable spaceplane; first reusable orbital spacecraft. Largest cargo capacity to orbit at the time. 135 spaceflights were made in six shuttles; Enterprise, Columbia, Challenger, Discovery, Atlantis, and Endeavour, of which two (Challenger and Columbia) were destroyed resulting in the deaths of 14 astronauts during missions STS-51-L and STS-107.

=== SpaceShipOne (2004) ===
United States privately developed single pilot, air-launched sub-orbital spaceplane; three flights above the Kármán line occurred in 2004.

=== SpaceShipTwo (2018-2024) ===
United States eight person air-launched sub-orbital space plane operated by Virgin Galactic aimed at the space tourism market. On 31 October 2014 during a test flight, VSS Enterprise, the first SpaceShipTwo craft, broke up in flight and crashed in the Mojave Desert. One pilot was killed. The second SpaceShipTwo craft, VSS Unity, was completed in 2016 and used until its retirement in 2024. On 13 December 2018, SpaceShipTwo flew to an altitude of 82.7 km, which is recognized as space by the FAA, NASA, and the USAF (although not the Fédération Aéronautique Internationale). This was the first time an American spacecraft had sent astronauts to space since the final Space Shuttle flight in 2011. On 11 July 2021 a fourth test flight was made above 80 km with six crew aboard, including the company owner Richard Branson. SpaceShipTwo made 12 successful crewed spaceflights in 13 attempts. The last flight of VSS Unity took place on 8 June 2024, marking the spacecraft's retirement.

== Former space stations ==
=== Salyut (1971–1986) ===
Soviet/Russian low Earth orbit space stations. Salyut 1 (1 crew 1971), Salyut 4 (2 crews 1975), Salyut 6 (6 crews 1977–1981), and Salyut 7 (12 crews 1982–1986). All now de-orbited.

=== Almaz (1974–1977) ===
Soviet military reconnaissance low Earth orbit space stations. Badged as Salyut 2 (no crew, loss of altitude shortly after launch), Salyut 3 (1 crew 1974), and Salyut 5 (2 crews 1976–1977), as disinformation. All three are now deorbited.

=== Skylab (1973–1974) ===
United States low Earth orbit space station. First United States space station. Visited by 3 crews 1973–1974. It deorbited in 1979.

=== Mir (1986–2000) ===
Soviet/Russian low Earth orbit modular space station. The first modular space station in history. Twenty-eight crews 1986–2000. Mir was visited by 29 Soyuz and 7 Space Shuttle missions. Mir was deorbited in 2001.

=== Tiangong program (2012–2016) ===
Chinese low Earth orbit space laboratories. Tiangong 1 was China's first space station; launched in 2011, visited by two crews 2012–2013, deorbited in 2018. Tiangong 2 was launched in 2016, visited by one crew in 2016, deorbited in 2019. Both vehicles were single-module laboratories, precursors to the modular Tiangong space station, which has modules derived from Tiangong 1 and 2.

== Crewed spacecraft in development ==
=== Starship ===
Starship is a spacecraft and upper stage being developed by SpaceX as part of the two-stage Starship launch system, whose first stage is the Super Heavy booster. The system is designed to be fully reusable and to carry crew and cargo to Earth orbit, the Moon, Mars, and other destinations. SpaceX states that Starship will be capable of carrying up to 100 people on long-duration interplanetary flights. Starship is also designed to use in-space propellant transfer for missions beyond low Earth orbit.

Integrated uncrewed flight testing of Starship and Super Heavy began in April 2023 and has continued through 2026.

A lunar lander variant, Starship HLS, is being developed for NASA's Human Landing System program. NASA selected SpaceX in 2021 to develop the lander for the Artemis program. Under a revised Artemis architecture announced by NASA in 2026, Artemis III is planned as a crewed demonstration mission in low Earth orbit in 2027 to test systems including rendezvous and docking with one or both commercial lunar landers being developed by SpaceX and Blue Origin. NASA is targeting Artemis IV in early 2028 for the first Artemis crewed lunar surface landing, with the lander provider dependent on readiness.

=== Gaganyaan ===
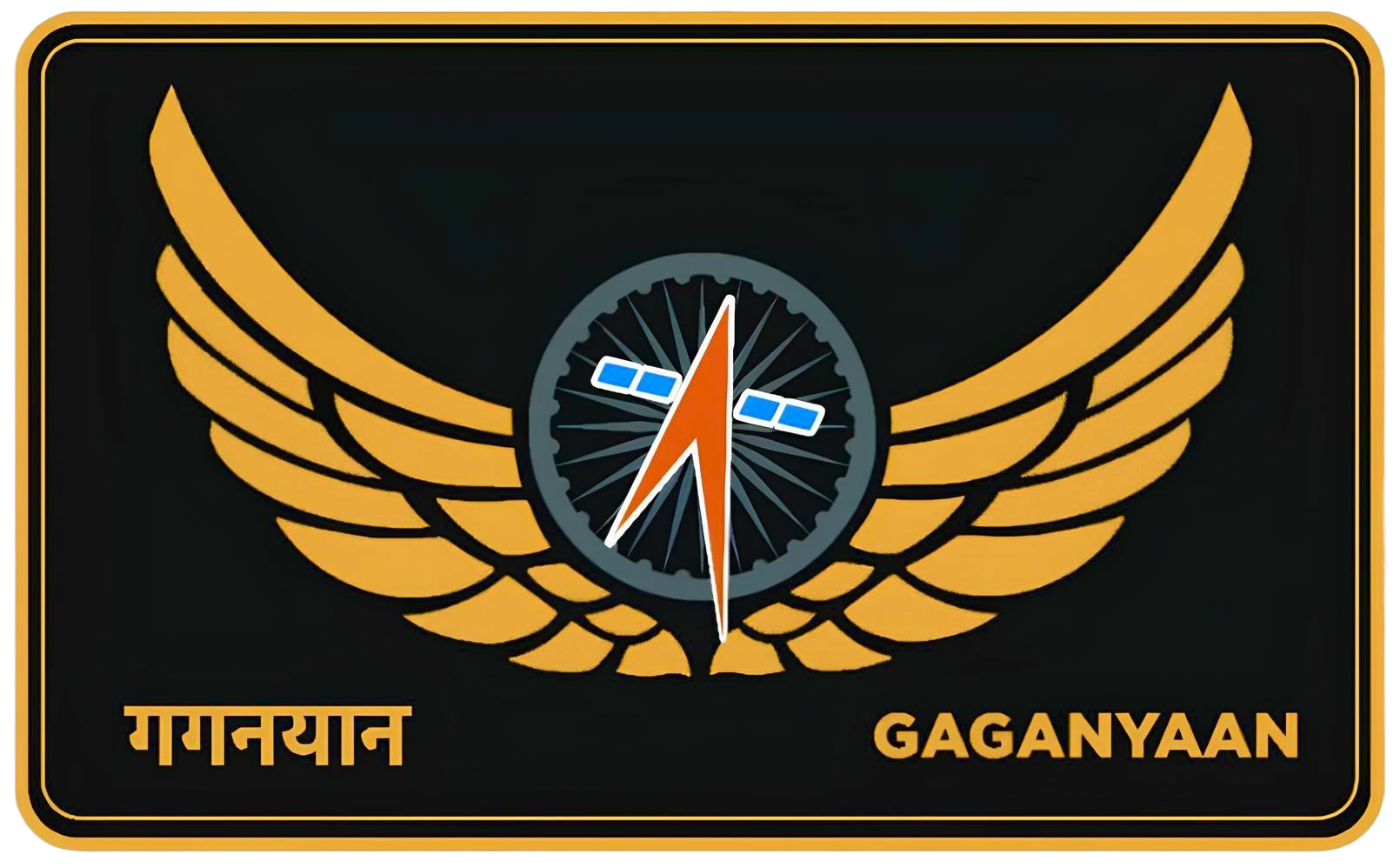
Indian astronaut logo for Ganganyaan programme

A three-person Earth orbital spacecraft intended to be the first crewed spacecraft of the Indian Human Spaceflight Programme. Gaganyaan will be capable of operating at low Earth orbit for up to seven days. The upgraded version will be equipped with rendezvous and docking capabilities. Its first crewed flight is planned for first quarter of 2027, and four Indian astronauts have begun flight training in Russia.

=== Mengzhou ===
Mengzhou is a reusable, modular crewed spacecraft being developed by the China Academy of Space Technology for the China Manned Space Agency. It is intended for both low Earth orbit missions, including operations with the Tiangong space station, and crewed lunar exploration, and can carry up to seven astronauts. A prototype completed an uncrewed orbital test flight in May 2020.

Mengzhou completed a zero-altitude abort test in June 2025. On 11 February 2026, a prototype spacecraft successfully performed a maximum dynamic pressure abort test during a low-altitude flight test of the Long March 10 launch vehicle and subsequently splashed down and was recovered at sea.

China plans to use Mengzhou together with the Lanyue lunar lander and Long March 10 for its crewed lunar exploration program, with Mengzhou and Lanyue launching separately and rendezvousing in lunar orbit. China is targeting a crewed lunar landing by 2030.

=== Dream Chaser ===
Dream Chaser is a reusable lifting body spaceplane being developed by Sierra Space. Its first orbital vehicle, Tenacity, is an uncrewed cargo variant, while Sierra Space is also developing a crewed variant for missions in low Earth orbit.

NASA awarded Sierra Space a Commercial Resupply Services 2 contract for Dream Chaser in 2016. In September 2025, NASA and Sierra Space modified the contract so that Dream Chaser's first orbital mission would instead be a free-flight demonstration, targeted for late 2026. NASA is no longer obligated to order a specific number of Dream Chaser resupply missions, but may order flights to the International Space Station following a successful demonstration.

=== Orel ===
Russian four-person lunar-capable spacecraft to enable the retirement of Soyuz. The first uncrewed and crewed flight is planned for 2028.

=== Blue Moon MK2 ===
Blue Moon Mark 2 is a crewed lunar lander being developed by Blue Origin for NASA's Human Landing System program as part of the Artemis program. NASA selected Blue Origin in 2023 as its second commercial provider of a crewed lunar landing system.

Under NASA's revised Artemis architecture, a test article based on the Mark 2 design is planned to participate in the Artemis III crewed demonstration mission in low Earth orbit in 2027, testing rendezvous and docking operations with the Orion spacecraft before future lunar surface missions.

A full-scale prototype of the Mark 2 crew cabin is in use at NASA's Johnson Space Center for training and testing. NASA states that the lunar lander is planned to launch uncrewed on a New Glenn rocket and carry two astronauts between lunar orbit and the lunar surface.

== Crewed spacecraft (planned) ==
- The Chinese company Space Transportation is developing a winged rocket for suborbital space tourism. As of January 2022, the first flight is planned for 2024.
- Copenhagen Suborbitals Tycho Brahe Micro Spacecraft (MSC) – a non-profit, all-volunteer project that aims to launch the first crewed amateur spacecraft into suborbital space. The project is being financed entirely through crowd-funding. If successful, this project will also make Denmark one of the few countries in the world that has a form of independent crewed spaceflight capabilities.
- Pegasus is a Japanese sub-orbital rocket plane currently being developed by PD AeroSpace.
- RSSC – a Russian reusable sub-orbital space complex, currently being developed by a private company KosmoKurs.
- Selena – NPO Aerospace Technologies (НПО «Авиационно-космические технологии»), suborbital space yacht.
- Susie – Smart Upper Stage for Innovative Exploration – a 2022 Arianespace proposal for a fully reusable five-person craft for use by ESA for low earth orbit.
- Lince is a project by the Spanish company PLD Space currently under development. It aims to create a cargo and crewed capsule capable of carrying up to four or five astronauts to low Earth orbit.

== Space stations in development ==
- Russian Orbital Service Station – Russia's planned next generation space station, designed and intended to replace the Russian Orbital Segment of the International Space Station.
- Axiom Station is a planned private space station by the company Axiom Space. It is intended to be operational before the ISS is decommissioned in 2030, with the first module launching no earlier than 2027.
- Starlab is a planned private space station being developed by the company Nanoracks in cooperation with Lockheed Martin. This free-flying space station was announced by the company on 21 October 2021, with a planned launch date of 2028.
- Orbital Reef is a planned private space station currently in development by Blue Origin and Sierra Nevada Corporation. This modular space station is being designed for commercial and space tourism missions and uses. Preliminary plans were unveiled on October 25, 2021, with a planned launch in the late 2020s.
- Haven-1 is a space station being developed by Vast. It is scheduled to launch no earlier than June 2026.
- Haven-2 - In October 2024, Vast announced Haven-2, a planned successor to Haven-1. It's intended to be much larger than Haven-1, with modular assembly and the intention of replacing the International Space Station. The first module of Haven-2 is expected to be launched by SpaceX Starship in 2028, if the station is approved during the second phase of NASA's Commercial LEO Destinations program in 2026.
- Bharatiya Antariksha Station - The Indian Orbital Space Station, officially called Bharatiya Antariksha Station (lit. 'Indian Space Station'), is a planned modular space station to be constructed by India and operated by the Indian Space Research Organisation (ISRO). As of December 2023, the first module is expected to be launched in 2028 on an LVM3 launch vehicle, with the remaining modules to be launched by 2035.
- Thunderbird Station - On 17 December 2025, Max Space announced that due to NASA's revisions of the Commercial LEO Destinations program, they were proposing a single launch space station based around their inflatable habitat technology. The station would expand to a volume of 350 cubic meters once in orbit. The station as proposed would be designed to support four people as well as allowing for continuous habitation using a pair of docking ports, allowing for resupply, crew rotation, and other visiting vehicles.

== Cancelled crewed spacecraft and space stations ==
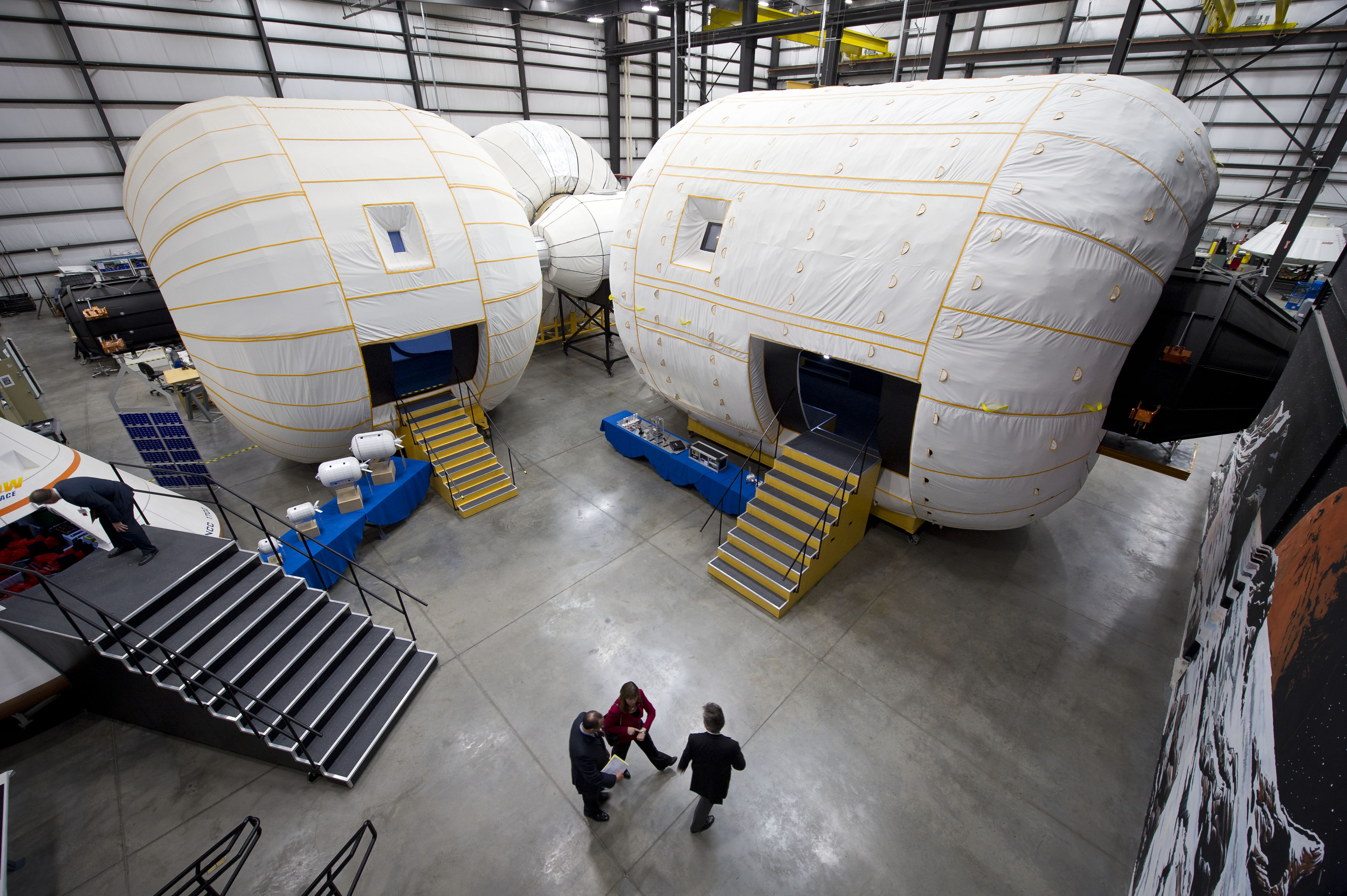
Mockup of Bigelow's Space Station

Spacecraft

- Buran, a Soviet space shuttle cancelled after only one uncrewed orbital flight in 1988.
- SpaceShip III, American eight-person suborbital spaceplane for use in space tourism and tended research flights
- The X-20 Dyna-Soar was a United States Air Force spaceplane intended to be used for military missions. The program to develop the spaceplane began in 1957 and was cancelled in 1963.
- LK, crewed Lunar lander for the Soviet crewed lunar programs. Several LK landers were flown in space with no crew. Cancelled in 1976 with the rest of the program.
- TKS, optionally crewed Soviet spacecraft designed to service the military Almaz space stations. TKS was launched uncrewed on four missions, successfully docking to Salyut stations three times. Later, parts of the spacecraft were used as a basis for several space station modules.
- Dynetics HLS, a planned NASA-contracted Human Landing System to be used on and around the Moon for NASA's Artemis program being developed by Dynetics and Sierra Nevada Corporation (SNC). Was not selected for HLS program.
- Integrated Lander Vehicle – a planned NASA-contracted, Blue Origin lead, Human Landing System to be used on and around the Moon for NASA's Artemis program. Lockheed Martin, Northrop Grumman, and Draper Laboratory are also developing key features of the vehicle. Was not selected for HLS program.

Space Stations

- MOL, crewed space station operated by the United States Armed Forces derived from the NASA's Gemini spacecraft. Cancelled in 1969.
- CSTS, a proposed collaborative effort between the European Space Agency and Roscosmos. Originally designed as an answer to the Orion program of NASA, the project was eventually cancelled and most of the designs were incorporated into Russia's next generation crewed spacecraft: Orel (spacecraft).
- OPSEK was a proposed successor to Russia's involvement in the International Space Station Program. Cancelled in 2017 by Roscosmos.
- Altair, (also known as the "Lunar Surface Access Module" or "LSAM" for short) was the planned lunar lander component of the Constellation Program. It would've been launched on the Ares V cargo launch vehicle and it, alongside an Earth Departure Stage would've awaited an Orion Spacecraft to launch and rendezvous with the spacecraft before the EDS sends it and Orion to the Moon with a crew of 4 astronauts for a lunar landing mission. Cancelled in 2010 alongside the rest of the Constellation program.
- Bigelow Commercial Space Station or Space Complex Alpha, was a proposed private space habitat scheduled for 2021 initial deployment although this was suspended indefinitely as a result of Bigelow temporarily laying off their entire staff due to the COVID-19 pandemic. A Bigelow test module has been installed on the International Space Station since 2016.
- Gateway – A NASA-driven international crewed space station orbiting the Moon to be assembled by commercial launch vehicles starting from 2027. Cancelled to speed up production and launch of the Artemis V and the NASA lunar base

== See also ==
- Lists of spacecraft
- List of space stations
- Comparison of crewed space vehicles
- Human spaceflight
- List of human spaceflight programs
- List of human spaceflights
  - 1961–1970
  - 1971–1980
  - 1981–1990
  - 1991–2000
  - 2001–2010
  - 2011–2020
  - 2021–present
- List of spaceflight records
- Crewed Mars rover
- Mars to Stay
- Private spaceflight
- Space medicine
- Tourism on the Moon
- Women in space
- List of canceled launch vehicle designs
