= Soyuz 17 =

Crewed flight of the Soyuz programme

- Mission type: Docking with Salyut 4
- Operator: Soviet space program
- COSPAR ID: 1975-001A
- SATCAT no.: 07604
- Mission duration: 29 days 13 hours 19 minutes 45 seconds
- Orbits completed: 479

Spacecraft properties
- Spacecraft: Soyuz 7K-T No.5
- Spacecraft type: Soyuz 7K-T
- Manufacturer: NPO Energia
- Launch mass: 6570 kg
- Landing mass: 1200 kg

Crew
- Crew size: 2
- Members: Aleksei Gubarev; Georgy Grechko
- Callsign: Зенит (Zenit - "Zenith")

Start of mission
- Launch date: 10 January 1975, 21:43:37 UTC
- Rocket: Soyuz
- Launch site: Baikonur, Site 1/5

End of mission
- Landing date: 9 February 1975, 11:03:22 UTC
- Landing site: 110 km at the northeast of Tselinograd, Kazakhstan

Orbital parameters
- Reference system: Geocentric orbit
- Regime: Low Earth orbit
- Perigee altitude: 293.0 km
- Apogee altitude: 354.0 km
- Inclination: 51.6°
- Period: 91.7 minutes

Docking with Salyut 4
- Docking date: 12 January 1975
- Undocking date: 9 February 1975
- Time docked: 28 days
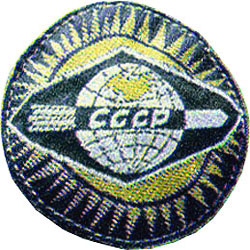
- Vimpel Diamond patch Soyuz programme

Soyuz 17 (Russian: Союз 17, Union 17) was the first of two long-duration missions to the Soviet Union's Salyut 4 space station in 1975. The flight by cosmonauts Aleksei Gubarev and Georgy Grechko set a Soviet mission-duration record of 29 days, surpassing the 23-day record set by the ill-fated Soyuz 11 crew aboard Salyut 1 in 1971.

== Crew ==
Position	Cosmonaut
Commander	Aleksei Gubarev; First spaceflight
Flight engineer	Georgy Grechko; First spaceflight

=== Backup crew ===
Position	Cosmonaut
Commander	Vasily Lazarev
Flight engineer	Oleg Makarov

=== Reserve crew ===
Position	Cosmonaut
Commander	Pyotr Klimuk
Flight engineer	Vitaly Sevastyanov

== Mission parameters ==
- Mass: 6,570 kg (14,480 lb)
- Perigee: 293.0 km (182.1 mi)
- Apogee: 354.0 km (220.0 mi)
- Inclination: 51.6°
- Period: 91.7 minutes

== Mission highlights ==
Salyut 4 was launched 26 December 1974, and Soyuz 17, with cosmonauts Georgy Grechko and Aleksei Gubarev as its first crew, was launched 16 days later on 10 January 1975. Gubarev manually docked Soyuz 17 to the station on 12 January 1975, and upon entering the new station he and Grechko found a note from its builders which said, "Wipe your feet"!

Salyut 4 was in an unusually high circular orbit of 350 km (220 mi) when Soyuz 17 docked with the station. Salyut designer Konstantin Feoktistov said this was to ensure propellant consumption would be half of what was needed for lower-altitude Salyuts.

The crew worked between 15 and 20 hours a day, including their 2 1/2 hour exercise period. One of their activities included testing communication equipment for tracking ships and contacting mission control via a Molniya satellite. Astrophysics was a major component of the mission, with the station's solar telescope activated on 16 January 1975. The crew later discovered that the main mirror of the telescope had been ruined by direct exposure to sunlight when the pointing system failed. They resurfaced the mirror on 3 February 1975 and worked out a way of pointing the telescope using a stethoscope, stopwatch, and the noises the moving mirror made in its casing.

On 14 January 1975, a ventilation hose was set up from Salyut 4 to keep the Soyuz ventilated while its systems were shut down. On 19 January 1975, it was announced that ion sensors were being used to orient the station, a system described as being more efficient. A new teleprinter was used for communications from the ground crew, freeing the Salyut crew from constant interruptions during their work.

The cosmonauts began powering down the station on 7 February 1975 and they returned to Earth in the Soyuz capsule two days later, on 9 February 1975. They safely landed near Tselinograd in a snowstorm with winds of 72 km/h and wore gravity suits to ease the effects of re-adaptation.

Soyuz-17 Cliff in Antarctica is named after the mission.
