= Salyut 4 =

Soviet space station (1974–1977)

Salyut 4 (DOS-4)
- Salyut 4 being constructed

- The insignia of the Salyut Program.

Station statistics
- COSPAR ID: 1974-104A
- SATCAT no.: 07591
- Call sign: Salyut 4
- Crew: 2
- Launch: December 26, 1974; 04:15:00 UTC
- Launch pad: LC-81/24, Baikonur Cosmodrome, Soviet Union
- Reentry: February 3, 1977
- Mass: 18,210 kilograms (40,150 lb) (fuelled mass); 16,210 kilograms (35,740 lb)
- Length: 15.8 m (52 ft)
- Width: 4.15 m (13.6 ft)
- Pressurised volume: 90 m^{3} (3,200 cu ft)
- Periapsis altitude: 136 mi (219 km)
- Apoapsis altitude: 168 mi (270 km)
- Orbital inclination: 51.6 degrees
- Orbital period: 89.1 minutes
- Days in orbit: 770 days
- Days occupied: 92 days
- No. of orbits: 12,444
- Distance travelled: ~313,651,190 mi (~504,772,660 km)
- Statistics as of de-orbit and reentry
- Configuration
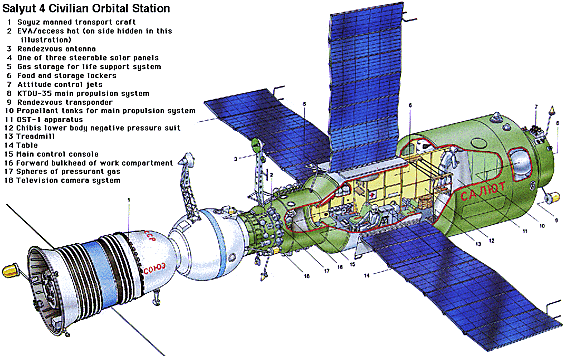
- Salyut 4 and Soyuz diagram

Salyut 4 (DOS 4) (Russian: Салют-4, lit. 'Salute 4') was a Salyut space station launched on December 26, 1974, into an orbit with an apogee of 355 km (221 mi), a perigee of 343 km (213 mi) and an orbital inclination of 51.6 degrees. It was essentially a copy of the DOS 3 (or Kosmos 557), and, unlike its ill-fated sibling, it was a complete success. Three crews attempted to make stays aboard Salyut 4 (Soyuz 17 and Soyuz 18 docked; Soyuz 18a suffered a launch abort). The second stay was for 63 days duration, and an uncrewed capsule, called Soyuz 20, remained docked to the station for three months, proving the system's long-term durability despite some deterioration of the environmental system during Soyuz 18's mission. Salyut 4 was deorbited February 2, 1977, and re-entered the Earth's atmosphere on February 3.

== Description ==
Salyut 4 represented the second phase of DOS civilian space station. Although the basic design of Salyut 1 was retained, it switched to three large solar panels mounted on the forward module rather than its predecessor's four small panels on the docking module and engine compartment, presumably to generate more power. It had an interior floor area of 34.8 m^{2} (375 sq ft) The thrusts of the station's attitude control thrusters were 2 X 59 N (pitch), 2 X 59 N (yaw) and 2 X 20 N (roll). The electric System produced an average of 2.00 kW of power. It had 2,000 kg (4,400 lb) of scientific equipment alongside two sets of three solar panels each and was equipped with the Delta Navigation System which was a new autonomous navigation system that calculates orbital elements without assistance from ground. It was powered by KTDU-66 thrusters.

=== Instrumentation ===
Installed on the Salyut 4 were OST-1 (Orbiting Solar Telescope) 25 cm (9.8 in) solar telescope with a focal length of 2.5 m (8 ft 2 in) and spectrograph shortwave diffraction spectrometer for far ultraviolet emissions, designed at the Crimean Astrophysical Observatory, and two X-ray telescopes. One of the X-ray telescopes, often called the Filin telescope, consisted of four gas flow proportional counters, three of which had a total detection surface of 450 cm^{2} (70 sq in) in the energy range 2–10 keV, and one of which had an effective surface of 37 cm^{2} (5.7 sq in) for the range 0.2 to 2 keV (32 to 320 aJ). The field of view was limited by a slit collimator to 3 in × 10 in (76 mm × 254 mm) full width at half maximum. The instrumentation also included optical sensors which were mounted on the outside of the station together with the X-ray detectors, and power supply and measurement units which were inside the station. Ground-based calibration of the detectors was considered along with in-flight operation in three modes: inertial orientation, orbital orientation, and survey. Data could be collected in 4 energy channels: 2 to 3.1 keV (320 to 497 aJ), 3.1 to 5.9 keV (497 to 945 aJ), 5.9 to 9.6 keV (945 to 1,538 aJ), and 2 to 9.6 keV (320 to 1,538 aJ) in the larger detectors. The smaller detector had discriminator levels set at 0.2 keV (32 aJ), 0.55 keV (88 aJ), and 0.95 keV (152 aJ).

Other instruments include a swivel chair for vestibular function tests, lower body negative pressure gear for cardiovascular studies, bicycle ergometer integrated physical trainer (electrically driven running track 1 m × 0.3 m (3 ft 3 in × 1 ft 0 in) with elastic cords providing 50 kg (110 lb) load), penguin suits and alternate athletic suit, sensors for temperature and characteristics of upper atmosphere, ITS-K infrared telescope spectrometer and ultraviolet spectrometer for study of earth's infrared radiation, multispectral earth resources camera, cosmic ray detector, embryological studies, new engineering instruments tested for orientation of station by celestial objects and in darkness and a teletypewriter.

== Science ==
Among others, observations of Scorpius X-1, Circinus X-1, Cygnus X-1, and A0620-00 were published from the Filin data. A highly variable low energy of 0.6 to 0.9 keV (96 to 144 aJ) flux was detected in Sco X-1. Cir X-1 was not detected at all during a July 5, 1975 observation, providing an upper limit on the emission of 3.5e-11 erg·cm^{−2·}s^{−1} (35 fW/m^{2}) in the 0.2 to 2.0 keV (32 to 320 aJ) range. Cyg X-1 was observed on several occasions. Highly variable flux, in both the time and energy domains, was observed.

== Specifications ==
- Length – 15.8 m (52 ft)
- Maximum diameter – 4.15 m (13.6 ft)
- Habitable volume – 90 m^{3} (3,200 cu ft)
- Weight at launch – 18,900 kg (41,700 lb)
- Launch vehicle – Proton (three-stage)
- Orbital inclination – 51.6°
- Area of solar arrays – 60 m^{2} (650 sq ft)
- Number of solar arrays – 3
- Electricity production – 4 kW
- Resupply carriers – Soyuz Ferry
- Number of docking ports – 1
- Total crewed missions – 3
- Total uncrewed missions – 1
- Total long-duration crewed missions – 2

== Visiting spacecraft and crews ==
- Soyuz 17 – January 11 – February 10, 1975
  - Aleksei Gubarev
  - Georgi Grechko
- Soyuz 18a – April 5, 1975 – Launch abort
  - Vasily Lazarev
  - Oleg Makarov
- Soyuz 18 – May 24 – July 26, 1975
  - Pyotr Klimuk
  - Vitaly Sevastyanov
- Soyuz 20 – November 17, 1975 – February 16, 1976
  - no crew

=== Salyut 4 Expeditions ===
Expedition	Crew	Launch date	Flight up	Landing date	Flight down	Duration (days)	Notes
Soyuz 17	Georgi Grechko, Aleksei Gubarev	January 11, 1975; 21:43:37 UTC	Soyuz 17	February 10, 1975; 11:03:22 UTC	Soyuz 17	29.56	Launch from Baikonur; landing 110 km (70 mi) northeast of Tselinograd; docking on space station Salyut 4, which had been launched 3 days earlier; transfer into space station and 29 days stay time there; astronomical experiments.
Soyuz 18	Pyotr Klimuk, Vitaly Sevastyanov	May 24, 1975; 14:58:10 UTC	Soyuz 18	July 26, 1975; 14:18:18 UTC	Soyuz 18	62.97	Launch from Baikonur; landing 56 km (35 mi) east of Arkalyk; 2. crew of spacestation Salyut 4; 62 days staying time; intensive fitness training; breeding of "space vegetable"; solar observation; taking photographs of Earth surface.

== See also ==
- Space station for statistics of occupied space stations
- Salyut
- TKS spacecraft
- Almaz
- Mir
- Skylab
- International Space Station
