= Soyuz 18 =

Crewed flight of the Soyuz programme

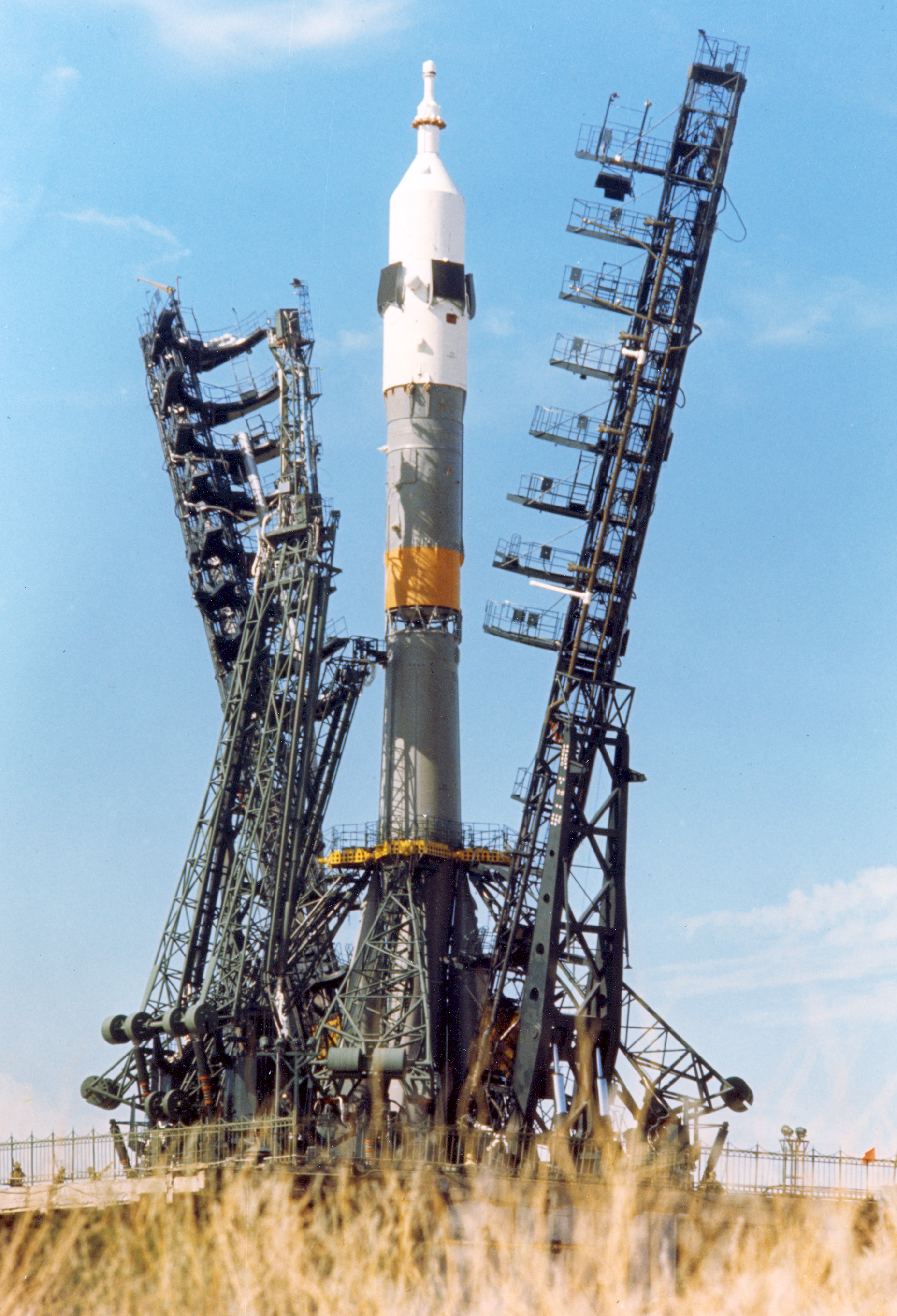
- A Soyuz-U on the launchpad for the Soyuz 18 mission
- Mission type: Docking with Salyut 4
- Operator: Soviet space program
- COSPAR ID: 1975-044A
- SATCAT no.: 07818
- Mission duration: 62 days, 23 hours, 20 minutes, 8 seconds
- Orbits completed: 993

Spacecraft properties
- Spacecraft: Soyuz 7K-T No. 7
- Manufacturer: NPO Energia
- Launch mass: 6,570 kg (14,480 lb)
- Landing mass: 1,200 kg (2,600 lb)

Crew
- Crew size: 2
- Members: Pyotr Klimuk; Vitaly Sevastyanov
- Callsign: Кавказ (Kavkaz - "Caucasus")

Start of mission
- Launch date: 24 May 1975, 14:58:10 UTC
- Rocket: Soyuz-U
- Launch site: Baikonur, Site 1/5

End of mission
- Landing date: 26 July 1975, 14:18:18 UTC
- Landing site: 56 km (35 mi) east of Arkalyk, Kazakhstan; 51°N 68°E

Orbital parameters
- Reference system: Geocentric orbit
- Regime: Low Earth orbit
- Perigee altitude: 193 km (120 mi)
- Apogee altitude: 247 km (153 mi)}
- Inclination: 51.6°
- Period: 88.6 minutes

Docking with Salyut 4
- Docking date: 26 May 1975
- Undocking date: 26 July 1975
- Time docked: 61 days
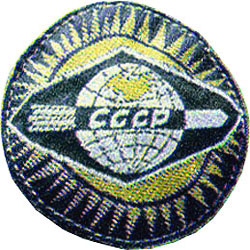
- Vimpel Diamond patch Soyuz programme

Soyuz 18 (Russian: Союз 18) was a 1975 Soviet crewed mission to Salyut 4, the second and final crew to man the space station. Pyotr Klimuk and Vitaly Sevastyanov set a new Soviet space endurance record of 63 days and the mark for most people in space simultaneously (seven) was tied during the mission.

== Crew ==
Position	Cosmonaut
Commander	Pyotr Klimuk; Second spaceflight
Flight engineer	Vitaly Sevastyanov; Second and last spaceflight

=== Backup crew ===
Position	Cosmonaut
Commander	Vladimir Kovalyonok
Flight engineer	Yuri Ponomaryov

== Mission parameters ==
- Mass: 6,570 kg (14,480 lb)
- Perigee: 193 km (120 mi)
- Apogee: 247 km (153 mi)
- Inclination: 51.6°
- Period: 88.6 minutes

== Mission highlights ==
The Soyuz 18 crew were the back-up crew for the failed Soyuz 18a mission, carried out that mission's objectives, and continued the work of the previous Soyuz 17 crew. Klimuk and Sevastyanov were launched into space on 24 May 1975 and docked with Salyut 4 two days later. The crew quickly set to performing experiments and fixing or replacing equipment. A spectrometer was repaired, a gas analyzer was replaced, and a pumping condenser in the water regeneration system was switched with a hand pump.

On 29 and 30 May 1975, biological and medical experiments were performed and the Oasis garden was started. Studies of the stars, planets, Earth and its atmosphere were started on 2 and 3 June 1975. Some 2,000 photographs of the Earth and 600 of the Sun were reported taken.

More medical experiments were performed in June 1975, and attempts were made to grow plants, including onions. Experiments were carried out on insects, and experiments on varying the work schedule were carried out. Extensive medical experiments were carried out on 23 June 1975, as the crew surpassed the Soviet space endurance record of 29 days, set by Soyuz 17, the Salyut's previous crew. The all-time record was held then by the Skylab 4 crew at 84 days.

On 3 July 1975, it was announced that the mission would last beyond the upcoming Apollo-Soyuz Test Project (ASTP). To avoid any conflict of resources, the Soyuz 18 crew was controlled from the old Crimean Control Center, while the ASTP Soyuz 19 mission would be controlled from the Kaliningrad Control Center. The Crimean center had not been used since the Soyuz 12 flight. This was the first time the Soviets had to control two unrelated space missions.

The ASTP crews were launched 15 and 16 July 1975, and the Soyuz 18 crew communicated with the Soyuz 19 crew on two brief occasions. The total of seven people in space tied the record set by the Soyuz 6, Soyuz 7 and Soyuz 8 flights of 1969. Once the American ASTP crew landed 24 July 1975, the Soviets had a near six-year monopoly on crewed space flights until the launch of the first Space Shuttle, STS-1, on 12 April 1981.

The Salyut living conditions were starting to degrade by July 1975, with the environmental control system failing, windows fogged over and green mold growing on the station walls. The crew donned exercise suits and increased their exercise period to over two hours a day, and on 18 July 1975 began to prepare the station for uncrewed flight. The Soyuz craft was activated on 24 July 1975 and the crew returned to Earth two days later, on 26 July 1975. It landed at 56 km at the East of Arkalyk, Kazakhstan. The cosmonauts exited the capsule under their own power, but it was two days before Klimuk could take a 10-minute walk, and a week before he made a full recovery.

Soyuz-18 Rock in Antarctica is named after the mission.
