= Soyuz 7K-T No.39 =

Unsuccessful crewed launch of the Soyuz programme

- Names: Soyuz 18a, Soyuz 18-1, April 5th Anomaly
- Mission type: Docking with Salyut 4
- Operator: Soviet space program
- Mission duration: 21 minutes 27 seconds 60 days (planned)
- Orbits completed: Failed to orbit
- Apogee: 192.0 km (sub-orbital spaceflight)

Spacecraft properties
- Spacecraft: Soyuz 7K-T No.6
- Spacecraft type: Soyuz 7K-T
- Manufacturer: OKB-1
- Launch mass: 6830 kg
- Landing mass: 1200 kg

Crew
- Crew size: 2
- Members: Vasily Lazarev; Oleg Makarov
- Callsign: Урал (Ural – "Ural")

Start of mission
- Launch date: 5 April 1975, 11:04:54 UTC
- Rocket: Soyuz
- Launch site: Baikonur, Site 1/5

End of mission
- Landing date: 5 April 1975, 11:26:21 UTC
- Landing site: Altai Mountains, Kazakhstan (official); 50°50′N 83°25′E

Orbital parameters
- Reference system: Geocentric orbit (planned)
- Regime: Low Earth orbit
- Altitude: 192.0 km
- Inclination: 51.6°
- Period: 90.0 minutes

Docking with Salyut 4 (planned)
- Salyut program insignia Soyuz programme

Soyuz 7K-T No.39 (also named Soyuz 18a or Soyuz 18-1 by some sources and also known as the April 5 Anomaly) was an unsuccessful launch of a crewed Soyuz spacecraft by the Soviet Union in 1975. The mission was expected to dock with the orbiting Salyut 4 space station, but due to a failure of the Soyuz launch vehicle the crew failed to make orbit. The crew consisted of commander Vasily Lazarev, and flight engineer Oleg Makarov, a civilian. Although the mission was aborted and did not accomplish its objective, the craft exceeded common space boundaries and therefore is recognized as a sub-orbital spaceflight, which the crew survived. The crew, who initially feared they had landed in China, were successfully recovered.

The accident was partly disclosed by the normally secretive Soviets as it occurred during preparations for their joint Apollo-Soyuz Test Project with the United States which flew three months later. Lazarev never flew to space again and never fully recovered from the accident; Makarov made two more flights on board a Soyuz (both of which were to the Salyut 6 space station).

== Crew ==
Position	Cosmonaut
Commander	Vasily Lazarev; Second and last spaceflight
Flight engineer	Oleg Makarov; Second spaceflight

=== Backup crew ===
Position	Cosmonaut
Commander	Pyotr Klimuk
Flight engineer	Vitaly Sevastyanov

== Mission highlights ==
Soyuz 7K-T No.39 was intended to be the second mission to take cosmonauts to the Soviet Salyut 4 space station for a 60-day mission. Both cosmonauts were on their second mission and had flown their first mission together, Soyuz 12, in September 1973 to test a new type of Soyuz spacecraft after the fatal accident of Soyuz 11.

The launch proceeded according to plan until T+288.6 seconds at an altitude of 145 km (90 mi; 78 nmi), when the second and third stages of the booster began separation. Only three of the six locks holding the stages together released and the third stage's engine ignited with the second stage still attached below it. The third stage's thrust broke the remaining locks, throwing the second stage free but putting the booster under unexpected strain that caused it to deviate from the proper trajectory. At T+295 seconds, the deviation was detected by the Soyuz's guidance system, which activated an automatic abort program. As the escape tower was long gone by this point, the abort had to be performed with the Soyuz's own engines. This separated the spacecraft from the third-stage booster and then separated the orbital and service modules of the Soyuz from the re-entry capsule. At the time, when the safety system initiated separation the spacecraft was already pointed downward toward Earth, which accelerated its descent significantly. Instead of the expected acceleration in such an emergency situation of 15 g (147 m/s^{2}), the cosmonauts experienced up to 21.3 g (209 m/s^{2}). Despite very high overloading, the capsule's parachutes opened properly and slowed the craft to a successful landing after a flight of only 21 minutes.

The capsule landed southwest of Gorno-Altaysk at a point 145 km (90 mi; 78 nmi) north of the Chinese border. The capsule landed on a snow-covered slope and began rolling downhill towards a 152 m (499 ft) sheer drop before it was stopped by the parachutes becoming snagged on vegetation. Having landed in chest-deep powder snow and a local temperature of −7 °C (19 °F), the cosmonauts donned their cold-weather survival clothing. The cosmonauts were uncertain if they had landed in China, at a time when Sino-Soviet relations were extremely hostile, so they quickly destroyed documents relating to a military experiment planned for the flight. They reportedly exited the spacecraft shortly after landing and built a fire. Soon, the crew was in radio contact with a rescue team in an approaching helicopter, who confirmed they were in the Soviet Union, near the town of Aleysk. The deep snow, the high altitude, and the terrain meant the rescuers had great difficulty in making contact with the cosmonauts. It was the next day before they were safely airlifted out. The crew were returned to Star City; the capsule was recovered some time later.

Initial Soviet reports stated the men had suffered no ill effects from their flight. However, subsequent reports claimed that Lazarev was injured by the high acceleration of re-entry. Makarov went on to take part in Soyuz 26, Soyuz 27, and Soyuz T-3 missions.

In Brezhnev's time, it was rare to disclose anything about Soviet failures, and so the first (Soviet) publication about the realities of the flight was made only a month later (8 May 1975). The Americans were informed on 7 April 1975 after the crew had been rescued. However, as the failure occurred during preparations for the joint Apollo-Soyuz Test Project, the United States requested that a more detailed report of the accident be provided. (There was even a United States congressional inquiry regarding this failure and several others.) In the report the Soviets made to the Americans, the abort was referred to as the "April 5th anomaly", and as this was the only term the Soviets ever used for the incident, that became the "official" designation for years afterwards. It was also disclosed that the booster used in the launch was an older model and not the same model that would be used for Soyuz 19. The mission is referred to in some literature as Soyuz 18a or Soyuz 18-1, since the following Soyuz mission in May 1975 received the name Soyuz 18. (The Soviets only gave numbers to successful launches.)

The exact landing site of the capsule was a subject of debate amongst space historians in subsequent years. A Russian source quoted by James Oberg has stated that the landing occurred in Mongolia.

The failed Soyuz mission was the only case of a crewed booster accident at high altitude until the accident with Soyuz MS-10 on 11 October 2018.

== Mission parameters ==
- Mass: 6,830 kg (15,060 lb)
- Apogee: 192.0 km (119.3 mi)

== See also ==
- Soyuz 7K-ST No.16L, 1983 Soyuz launch failure
- Soyuz MS-10, 2018 in-flight failure
- List of spaceflight-related accidents and incidents
