= Soyuz 20 =

1975 Soviet uncrewed spaceflight to Salyut 4

- Mission type: Orbital test flight
- Operator: Soviet space program
- COSPAR ID: 1975-106A
- SATCAT no.: 8430
- Mission duration: 90 days, 11 hours and 47 minutes
- Orbits completed: 1470

Spacecraft properties
- Spacecraft: Soyuz 7K-T No.8
- Spacecraft type: Soyuz 7K-T/A9
- Manufacturer: NPO Energia
- Launch mass: 6,570 kg (14,480 lb)
- Landing mass: 2,800 kg (6,200 lb)

Start of mission
- Launch date: 17 November 1975, 14:36:37 UTC
- Rocket: Soyuz-U
- Launch site: Baikonur 1/5

End of mission
- Landing date: 16 February 1976, 02:24 UTC
- Landing site: 56 km at the southwest of Arkalyk, Kazakhstan

Orbital parameters
- Reference system: Geocentric orbit
- Regime: Low Earth orbit
- Perigee altitude: 199.7 km (124.1 mi)
- Apogee altitude: 263.5 km (163.7 mi)
- Inclination: 51.6°
- Period: 88.8 minutes

Docking with Salyut 4
- Docking date: 19 November 1975, 16:19 UTC
- Undocking date: 16 February 1976, 23:07 UTC
- Time docked: 89 days, 6 hours and 48 minutes

Soyuz 20 (Russian: Союз 20, Union 20) was an uncrewed spacecraft launched by the Soviet Union. It was a long-duration test of the Soyuz spacecraft that docked with the Salyut 4 space station. Soyuz 20 performed comprehensive checking of improved on-board systems of the spacecraft under various flight conditions. It also carried a biological payload. Living organisms were exposed to three months in space. The primary goal of the mission was to test hardware modifications to the Soyuz 7K-T spacecraft that would extend its operating life from two to three months in preparation for long-duration Salyut crew residencies.

== Mission parameters ==
- Mass: 6,570 kg (14,480 lb)
- Perigee: 199.7 km (124.1 mi)
- Apogee: 263.5 km (163.7 mi)
- Inclination: 51.6°
- Period: 88.8 minutes

== Return ==
It was recovered on 16 February 1976 at 02:24 UTC.
