= Oleg Makarov (cosmonaut) =

Soviet engineer and cosmonaut (1933–2003)

- Олег Макаров
- Makarov in 1978
- Born: 6 January 1933; Udomlya, Russian SFSR, Soviet Union
- Died: 28 May 2003 (aged 70); Moscow, Russia
- Occupation: Engineer
- Awards: Hero of the Soviet Union (twice)
- Space career

Cosmonaut
- Time in space: 20d 17h 20m
- Selection: Civilian Specialist Group 3
- Missions: Soyuz 12, Soyuz 18a, Soyuz 27, Soyuz 26, Soyuz T-3

Oleg Grigoryevich Makarov (Russian: Олег Григорьевич Макаров; 6 January 1933 – 28 May 2003) was a Soviet cosmonaut.

== Early life and education ==
Makarov was born in Udomlya, Tver Oblast, USSR. He graduated from Bauman Moscow Higher Technical School in 1957 and started working at the Special Design Bureau Number One (which is now RSC Energia) as an engineer, working on the Vostok spacecraft. In 1966, he was selected for cosmonaut training.

== Space program ==
He was originally part of the Soviet lunar program and was training with Alexei Leonov for the first human circumlunar flight. After the success of Apollo 8, however, the flight was cancelled.

His first spaceflight was Soyuz 12 in 1973, a test flight to check the changes made to the Soyuz spacecraft after the Soyuz 11 disaster. His second flight was the abortive Soyuz 18a that made an emergency landing in the Altay Mountains, 21 minutes after launch. With his third launch on Soyuz 27 he flew to space station Salyut 6 and landed five days later with the Soyuz 26 spacecraft. His last mission was Soyuz T-3, during which several repairs on Salyut 6 were done. He also served on the backup crews for Soyuz 17 and Soyuz T-2. Altogether he spent 20 days, 17 hours, and 44 minutes in space.

== Later life ==
After his final spaceflight he continued to work for Energia, both in the Mir space station program as well as the Energia-Buran development. He died in Moscow in 2003 from a heart attack.

== Awards ==
- Twice Hero of the Soviet Union (2 October 1973 and 16 March 1978)
- Pilot-Cosmonaut of the USSR (2 October 1973)
- Four Order of Lenin (2 October 1973, 21 April 1975, 16 March 1978, 10 December 1980)
- Order "Blue Nile" of Ethiopia (10 October 1981)
- Honorary Citizen of Baikonur, Dzhezkazgan, Kaluga, Karaganda, Rivne, and Yakutsk.

== Literature ==
- V.A. Lopota, ed. (2014). С.П. Королёв : энциклопедия жизни и творчества. Ракетно-космическая корпорация "Энергия" имени С.П. Королёва. Moscow: Energiya. ISBN 978-5-906674-04-3. OCLC 1084302279.
