= Aleksei Gubarev =

Soviet general, pilot and cosmonaut (1931–2015)

- Алексей Губарев
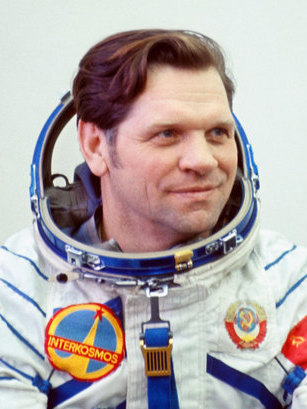
- Gubarev in 1978
- Born: 29 March 1931; Gvardeitsi, Samara Oblast, USSR
- Died: 21 February 2015 (aged 83); Moscow, Russia
- Occupations: Cosmonaut, Pilot
- Awards: Hero of the Soviet Union (2); Order of Lenin (2)
- Space career
- Rank: Major General, Soviet Naval Air Force
- Time in space: 37d 11h 36m
- Selection: Air Force Group 2
- Missions: Soyuz 17, Soyuz 28

Aleksei Aleksandrovich Gubarev (Russian: Алексе́й Алекса́ндрович Гу́барев; 29 March 1931 – 21 February 2015) was a Soviet cosmonaut who flew on two space flights: Soyuz 17 and Soyuz 28.

== Biography ==
Gubarev graduated from the Soviet Naval Aviation School in 1952 and went on to serve with the Soviet Air Force. He undertook further studies at the Gagarin Air Force Academy before being accepted into the space programme.

Gubarev was originally trained for the Soviet lunar programme and for military Soyuz flights before training for Salyut missions. His next mission, in 1978, was Soyuz 28, the first Interkosmos flight, where he was accompanied by Vladimír Remek from Czechoslovakia.

In 1971, Gubarev became backup commander for the ill-fated Soyuz 11 mission, which killed the three-man crew when the craft depressurized in space.

Gubarev resigned as a cosmonaut in 1981 and took up an administrative position at the Gagarin Cosmonaut Training Centre.

In 1980s, he worked at the 30th Central Scientific Research Institute, Ministry of Defence (Russia).

Gubarev's awards includes the Gagarin Gold Medal, which was bestowed upon him twice. He was an honorary citizen of Kaluga, Arkalyk, Tselinograd, and Prague.

Gubarev published a book, The Attraction of Weightlessness, in 1982.

Gubarev died at the age of 83 on 21 February 2015.

== Honours and awards ==
- Twice Hero of the Soviet Union
- Pilot-Cosmonaut of the USSR
- Two Orders of Lenin
- Medal "For Merit in Space Exploration" (Russian Federation)
- Medal "For the Development of Virgin Lands"

Foreign awards:

- Hero of the Czechoslovak Socialist Republic
- Order of Klement Gottwald (Czechoslovak Socialist Republic)
- Medal "For Strengthening Military Cooperation" (Czechoslovak Socialist Republic)
- Medal of Sino-Soviet Friendship (People's Republic of China)
- Medal "Brotherhood in Arms" (German Democratic Republic)
