= Pyotr Klimuk =

Soviet cosmonaut (born 1942)

- Пётр Климук; Пётр Клімук
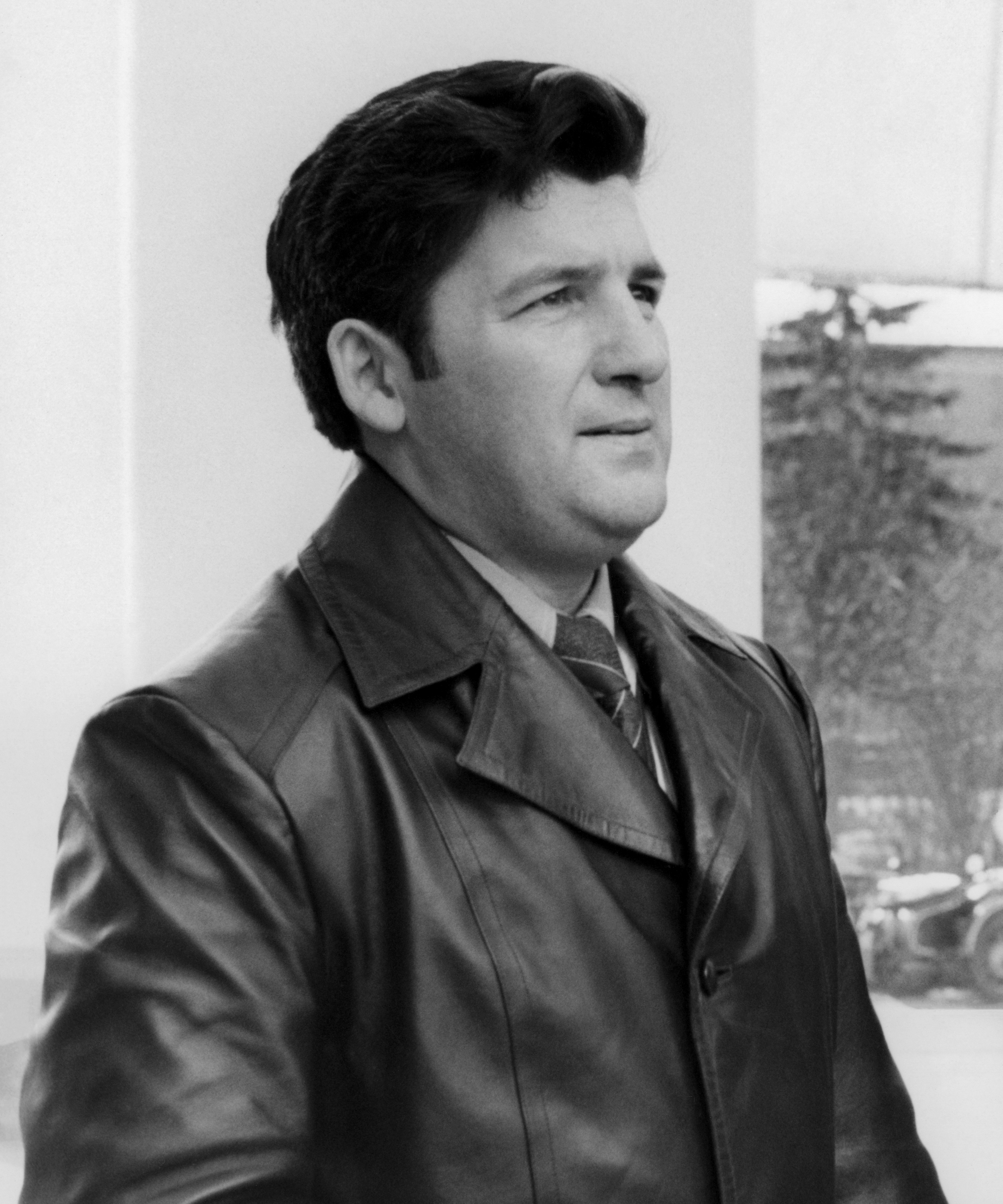
- Klimuk in 1970
- Born: 10 July 1942 (age 84); Kamaroŭka, BSSR, Soviet Union
- Occupation: Pilot-cosmonaut
- Awards: Hero of the Soviet Union (2); Order of Lenin (3); Order of Merit for the Fatherland 3rd class; Order of Merit for the Fatherland 4th class
- Space career

Cosmonaut
- Status: Retired
- Rank: Colonel General
- Time in space: 78d 18h 17m
- Selection: 1965 Cosmonaut Group
- Missions: Soyuz 13, Soyuz 18, Soyuz 30

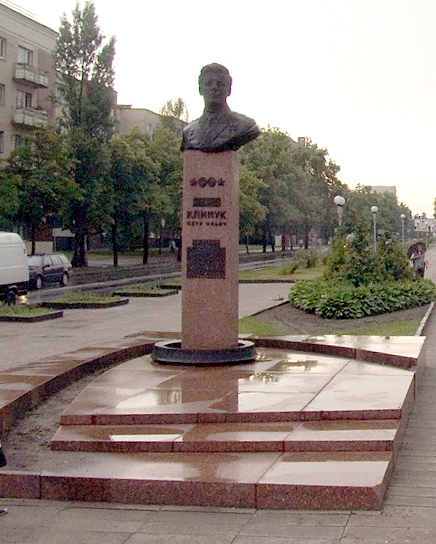
Bust of Pyotr Klimuk on Cosmonauts Boulevard in Brest, Belarus

Pyotr Ilyich Klimuk (Belarusian: Пётр Ільіч Клімук; Russian: Пётр Ильич Климу́к; born 10 July 1942) is a former Soviet cosmonaut and the first Belarusian to travel in space. Klimuk made three flights into space. From 1991 to 2003, he headed the Yuri Gagarin Cosmonaut Training Center.

== Life ==
Klimuk attended the Leninski Komsomol Chernigov High Aviation School and entered the Soviet Air Force in 1964. The following year, he was selected to join the space programme.

His first flight was a long test flight on Soyuz 13 in 1973. This was followed by a mission to the Salyut 4 space station on Soyuz 18 in 1975.

From 1976 he became involved in the Intercosmos and made his third and final spaceflight on an Intercosmos flight with Polish cosmonaut Mirosław Hermaszewski on Soyuz 30 in 1978.

He resigned from the cosmonaut team in 1978 to take up a position as the Assistant to the Chief of the Gagarin Cosmonaut Training Center. In 1991 he was promoted to Chief of that facility and remained in that post until retirement in 2003.

Klimuk is a graduate of the Gagarin Air Force Academy and the Lenin Military-Political Academy.

He is the author of two books on human spaceflight: Beside the Stars, and Attack on Weightlessness.

== Honours and awards ==
- Hero of the Soviet Union, twice (1973, 1975)
- Pilot-Cosmonaut of the USSR
- Order of Merit for the Fatherland;
  - 3rd class (2 March 2000) – a great service to the state in the development of crewed space flight
  - 4th class (1996)
- Three Orders of Lenin (1973, 1975, 1978)
- Order for Service to the Homeland in the Armed Forces of the USSR, 3rd class (1984)
- Medal "For Merit in Space Exploration" (12 April 2011) – for the great achievements in the field of research, development and use of outer space, many years of diligent work, public activities
- Order "For Service to Motherland", 2nd class (Belarus, 15 July 2002) – for services to develop and strengthen scientific, technological and military cooperation
- Order of Friendship of Peoples (Belarus) (16 July 2007) – for his significant contribution to strengthening the friendly relations and cooperation between Belarus and the Russian Federation
- Cross of Grunwald, 1st class (NDP, 1978)
- Order of Parasat (Kazakhstan, 1995)
- Officer of the Legion of Honour (France, 2004)
- Medal, "Brotherhood in Arms", twice (Poland)
- Medal "For the strengthening of friendship in Arms", 1st class (Czechoslovakia)
- Medal "100th anniversary of the fall of the Ottoman yoke" (NRB)
- Medal "from the grateful people of Afghanistan" (1988)
- USSR State Prize (1978) – for his work on medical justification and implementation of complex methods and means of preventing the adverse effects of weightlessness on the human body, allowing for the possibility of prolonged crewed space flights
- Lenin Komsomol Prize (1978) – script for the documentary "Common Space"
- Tsiolkovski Gold Medal
- Gagarin Gold Medal
- Gold Medal from the Polish Academy of Sciences
- Honorary citizen of the cities of Kaluga, Gagarin, and Dzhezkasgan

== Books ==
- Клімук П. Зоры – побач. Кніга аднаго палёту. Мн. : Маст. літ., 1977.
- The official website of the city administration Baikonur - Honorary citizens of Baikonur
