= Vitaly Sevastyanov =

Soviet engineer, cosmonaut, chess federation head and presenter (1935–2010)

- Виталий Севастьянов
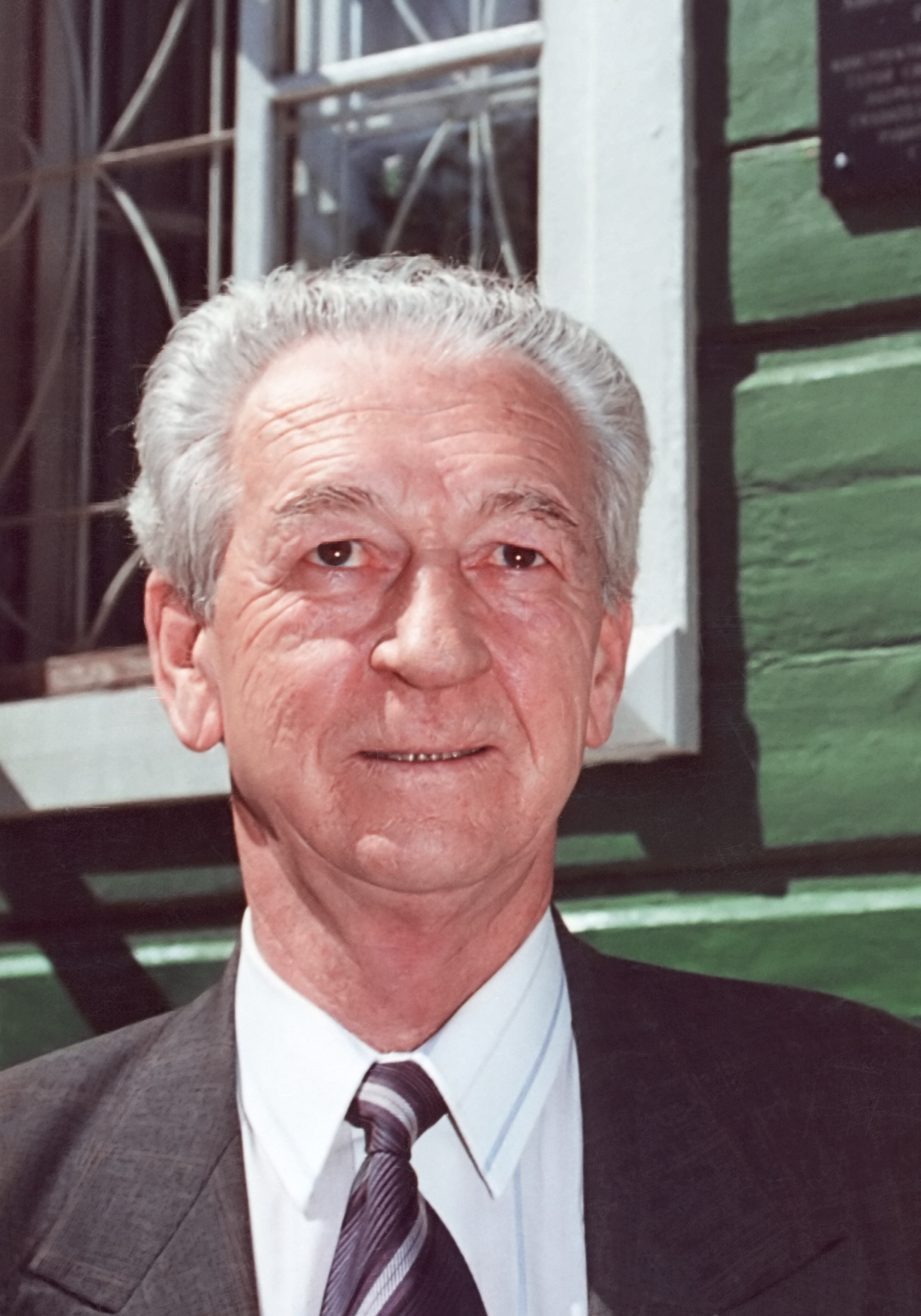
- Sevastyanov in 2002
- Born: 8 July 1935; Krasnouralsk, Russian SFSR, Soviet Union
- Died: 5 April 2010 (aged 74); Moscow, Russia
- Occupation: Engineer
- Awards: Hero of the Soviet Union (twice)
- Space career

Cosmonaut
- Time in space: 80d 16h 18m
- Selection: Civilian Specialist Group 3
- Missions: Soyuz 9, Soyuz 18

Vitaly Ivanovich Sevastyanov (Russian: Вита́лий Ива́нович Севастья́нов; 8 July 1935 – 5 April 2010) was a Soviet cosmonaut and an engineer who flew on the Soyuz 9 and Soyuz 18 missions.

He trained as an engineer at the Moscow Aviation Institute and after graduation in 1959, joined Sergey Korolev's design bureau, where he worked on the design of the Vostok spacecraft. He also lectured at the Cosmonaut Training Centre, teaching the physics of spaceflight. In 1967 he commenced cosmonaut training himself. Between 15 and 24 September 1972 he Sevastyanov visited Zagreb, Yugoslavia.

After two successful missions, including a two-month stay on the Salyut 4 space station, he was pulled from active flight status in 1976. He worked in ground control for the Salyut 6 station before returning to spacecraft design in the 1980s to work on the Buran project.

In 1971, he was the backup Flight Engineer for the ill-fated Soyuz 11 Mission, which ended in disaster when the craft depressurized above the Kármán line, killing the three man crew.

He was president of the Soviet Chess Federation from 1977 to 1986 and from 1988 to 1989.

During the 1980s he was the host of a popular television program on space exploration entitled Man, Earth, Universe.

In 1993, he left the space programme and was elected to the State Duma in 1994.

Sevastyanov, along with Aleksey Leonov, Rusty Schweickart and Georgy Grechko established the Association of Space Explorers in 1984. Membership is open to all people who have flown in outer space.

He died in Moscow on 5 April 2010, aged 74.

== Sochi International Airport ==
The Airport in Sochi Has been named after him.

== Awards ==
- Twice Hero of the Soviet Union
- Pilot-Cosmonaut of the USSR
- Two Orders of Lenin
- Jubilee Medal "In Commemoration of the 100th Anniversary since the Birth of Vladimir Il'ich Lenin"
- State Prize of the USSR
- Lenin Komsomol Prize
- Honoured Master of Sport
- Order of the Nile (Egypt)
- Yuri Gagarin Gold Medal (Fédération Aéronautique Internationale)
