= Vasily Lazarev =

Soviet cosmonaut (1928–1990)

- Василий Лазарев
- Lazarev in 1974
- Born: 23 February 1928; Poroshino, Altai Krai, Russian SFSR, Soviet Union
- Died: 31 December 1990 (aged 62); Moscow, Russian SFSR, Soviet Union
- Occupation: Medical Doctor
- Awards: Hero of the Soviet Union
- Space career

Cosmonaut
- Rank: Colonel, Soviet Air Force
- Time in space: 1d 23h 36m
- Selection: Voskhod Group (Medical Group 1)
- Missions: Soyuz 12, Soyuz 18a

Vasily Grigoryevich Lazarev (Russian: Васи́лий Григо́рьевич Ла́зарев; 23 February 1928 – 31 December 1990) was a Soviet cosmonaut who flew on the Soyuz 12 spaceflight as well as the abortive Soyuz 18a launch on 5 April 1975.

He was injured by the high acceleration of the abort and landing and was initially denied his spaceflight bonus pay, having to appeal directly to Leonid Brezhnev to receive it. Brezhnev was at the time the General Secretary of the Communist Party of the Soviet Union.

Lazarev held a degree in medicine and the rank of colonel in the Soviet Air Force. He remained in the space programme until failing a physical in 1981. He never fully recovered from the injuries sustained on Soyuz 18a and died on the last day of 1990 at the age of 62.

He was awarded the title Hero of the Soviet Union, the title Pilot-Cosmonaut of the USSR and the Order of Lenin.
