= List of Soyuz missions =

This is a list of crewed and uncrewed flights of Soyuz series spacecraft.

The Soyuz programme is an ongoing human spaceflight programme which was initiated by the Soviet Union in the early 1960s, originally part of a Moon landing project intended to put a Soviet cosmonaut on the Moon. It is the third Soviet human spaceflight programme after the Vostok and Voskhod programmes. Since the 1990s, as the successor state to the Soviet Union, Russia has continued and expanded the programme, which became part of a multinational collaboration to ensure a permanent human presence in low Earth orbit on the ISS (ISS). Soyuz spacecraft previously visited the Salyut and Mir space stations. Between the retirement of the Space Shuttle in 2011 and the first orbital flight of SpaceX's Crew Dragon in 2019, Soyuz were the only human-rated orbital spacecraft in operation, and the only way to transport crews to the ISS. Russia plans to succeed Soyuz in the 2020s with the Federatsiya/Orel programme, using new reusable capsules launching on Angara rockets, to transport cosmonauts to orbit.

== Crewed mission numbers and spacecraft generations ==
Beginning in 1966, the Soyuz programme has sent humans into space on a regular basis for over fifty years. Due to its length, the program has a complex history, which may lead to confusion about its mission numbers. The mission numbering scheme for crewed Soyuz flights is closely related to the generations of spacecraft. Understanding the former is made significantly easier by understanding the latter.

The first era of the Soyuz programme's crewed missions (Soyuz 1-40) used the 7K series of Soyuz craft, which included the first-generation (1.0) Soyuz 7K-OK, a variant (1.5) Soyuz 7K-OKS, the second-generation (2.0) Soyuz 7K-T, and the (2.5) Soyuz 7K-TM variant. Following this first era, successive eras of crewed missions have had mission numbers which were directly tied to the names of craft used:

- The second era of Soyuz T flights used the third-generation (3.0) craft of the same name. Mission numbers were of the form: "Soyuz T-#".
- The third era of Soyuz TM flights used the fourth-generation (4.0) craft of the same name. Mission numbers were of the form: "Soyuz TM-#".
- The fourth era of Soyuz TMA flights used the fifth-generation (5.0) craft of the same name. Mission numbers were of the form: "Soyuz TMA-#".
- The fifth era of Soyuz TMA-M flights used the fifth-generation variant (5.5) craft of the same name. Mission numbers were of the form "Soyuz TMA-##M".
- The sixth and current era of Soyuz MS flights uses the sixth-generation (6.0) craft of the same name. Mission numbers are of the form: "Soyuz MS-##".

Within each given era, a mission number generally reflects the mission's chronological launch order, e.g. Soyuz TMA-12M was the twelfth mission of the TMA-M era, immediately preceded by Soyuz TMA-11M and immediately followed by Soyuz TMA-13M. Although there are exceptions to this (detailed below in the first table), the mission numbering scheme is usually consistent with chronological launch orders. This is in contrast with the mission numbers of the Space Shuttle program, which were tied to specific mission objectives and did not reflect chronological launch orders, e.g. STS-50, the forty-eighth Shuttle mission, was immediately followed by STS-46, the forty-ninth Shuttle mission.

Era	Mission numbers	Spacecraft	Spacecraft generation	"Naive" mission count	Adding	Subtracting	Crewed missions	Total crewed missions
1	Soyuz 1 ... 40	Soyuz 7K-OK	1.0	40	18a (Note: Aborted mission which nevertheless achieved sub-orbital spaceflight, with the crew surviving.) (+1)	2, (Note: Uncrewed flight.) 20 (−2)	1, 3–9	39 (Note: Includes five special cases: two fatal missions, Soyuz 1 and Soyuz 11, both of which reached space; Soyuz 19, the Soviet participant in the Apollo-Soyuz Test Project; Soyuz 32, which sent a crew to the Salyut 6 space station and returned to Earth without its crew, and Soyuz 34, which was launched uncrewed and sent to Salyut 6 to provide the crew of Soyuz 32 with a successful return craft.)
1	Soyuz 1 ... 40	Soyuz 7K-OKS	1.5	40	18a (+1)	2, 20 (−2)	10, 11	39
1	Soyuz 1 ... 40	Soyuz 7K-T	2.0	40	18a (+1)	2, 20 (−2)	12–15, 17, 18a, 18, 21, 23–40	39
1	Soyuz 1 ... 40	Soyuz 7K-TM	2.5	40	18a (+1)	2, 20 (−2)	16, 19, 22	39
2	Soyuz T-1 ... T-15	Soyuz T	3.0	15	T-10a (Note: Mission aborted at-launch due to a pad fire, failing to achieve spaceflight; crew survived. Included here as a committed launch attempt and a notable historical example.) (+1)	T-1 (−1)	2–9, 10a, 10–15	15
3	Soyuz TM-1 ... TM-34	Soyuz TM	4.0	34	—	TM-1 (−1)	2-34	33
4	Soyuz TMA-1 ... TMA-22	Soyuz TMA	5.0	22	—	—	1–22	22
5	Soyuz TMA-01M ... TMA-20M	Soyuz TMA-M	5.5	20	—	—	1–20	20
6	Soyuz MS-01 ... MS-25	Soyuz MS	6.0	25	—	MS-14 (−1)	1–13, 15–25	24 (Note: Soyuz MS-10 aborted after launch, failing to reach space; crew survived. Included here as a committed launch attempt and a notable historical example.)
Total crewed missions								153

== Soyuz 7K (1966–1981) ==
The first Soyuz series was the 7K series.

No.	Mission	Spacecraft	Date of launch	Date of landing	Crew (launch/landing)	Docking	Outcome
—	Kosmos 133	Soyuz 7K-OK (A); 11F615 #2	28 November 1966	30 November 1966	None	Soyuz 7K-OK No.1 — Cancelled due to the postponement of the launch of the 2nd ship	Partial
—	Soyuz 7K-OK No.1	Soyuz 7K-OK (P); 11F615 #1	14 December 1966	NA	None (rocket exploded on launch pad)	Kosmos 133 — Cancelled	Failure
—	Kosmos 140	Soyuz 7K-OK (P); 11F615 #3	7 February 1967	11 February 1967	None		Success
1	Soyuz 1	Soyuz 7K-OK (A); 11F615 #4	23 April 1967	24 April 1967	(Soviet Union) Vladimir Komarov (killed during landing due to main parachute failure)	Soyuz 2A — Docking (and launch of the 2nd ship) has been cancelled due to the failure of Soyuz 1	Failure
—	Kosmos 186	Soyuz 7K-OK (A); 11F615 #6	27 October 1967	31 October 1967	None	Kosmos 188	Success
—	Kosmos 188	Soyuz 7K-OK (P); 11F615 #5	30 October 1967	2 November 1967	None	Kosmos 186	Success
—	Kosmos 212	Soyuz 7K-OK (A); 11F615 #8	14 April 1968	19 April 1968	None	Kosmos 213	Success
—	Kosmos 213	Soyuz 7K-OK (P); 11F615 #7	15 April 1968	20 April 1968	None	Kosmos 212	Success
—	Kosmos 238	Soyuz 7K-OK; 11F615 #9	28 August 1968	1 September 1968	None		Success
—	Soyuz 2	Soyuz 7K-OK (P); 11F615 #11	25 October 1968	28 October 1968	None	Soyuz 3 — Docking failed due to errors in spacecraft orientation	Partial
2	Soyuz 3	Soyuz 7K-OK (A); 11F615 #10	26 October 1968	30 October 1968	(Soviet Union) Georgy Beregovoy	Soyuz 2 — Docking failed due to errors in spacecraft orientation	Partial
3	Soyuz 4	Soyuz 7K-OK (A); 11F615 #12	14 January 1969	17 January 1969	(Soviet Union) Vladimir Shatalov	Soyuz 5	Success
3	Soyuz 4	Soyuz 7K-OK (A); 11F615 #12	14 January 1969	17 January 1969	(Soviet Union) Vladimir Shatalov (Soviet Union) Aleksei Yeliseyev (Soviet Union) Yevgeny Khrunov	Soyuz 5	Success
4	Soyuz 5	Soyuz 7K-OK (P); 11F615 #13	15 January 1969	18 January 1969	(Soviet Union) Boris Volynov (Soviet Union) Aleksei Yeliseyev (Soviet Union) Yevgeny Khrunov	Soyuz 4	Success
4	Soyuz 5	Soyuz 7K-OK (P); 11F615 #13	15 January 1969	18 January 1969	(Soviet Union) Boris Volynov	Soyuz 4	Success
5	Soyuz 6	Soyuz 7K-OK; 11F615 #14	11 October 1969	16 October 1969	(Soviet Union) Georgi Shonin (Soviet Union) Valeri Kubasov	The crew should have taken pictures of the docking between Soyuz 7 and Soyuz 8, but it wasn't possible	Partial
6	Soyuz 7	Soyuz 7K-OK (A); 11F615 #15	12 October 1969	17 October 1969	(Soviet Union) Anatoly Filipchenko (Soviet Union) Vladislav Volkov (Soviet Union) Viktor Gorbatko	Soyuz 8 — Failed due to the failure of rendezvous electronics	Partial
7	Soyuz 8	Soyuz 7K-OK (P); 11F615 #16	13 October 1969	18 October 1969	(Soviet Union) Vladimir Shatalov (Soviet Union) Aleksei Yeliseyev	Soyuz 7 — Failed due to the failure of rendezvous electronics	Partial
8	Soyuz 9	Soyuz 7K-OK; 11F615 #17	1 June 1970	19 June 1970	(Soviet Union) Andrian Nikolayev (Soviet Union) Vitaly Sevastyanov		Success
9	Soyuz 10	Soyuz 7K-OKS; 11F615A8 #31	23 April 1971	25 April 1971	(Soviet Union) Vladimir Shatalov (Soviet Union) Aleksei Yeliseyev (Soviet Union) Nikolai Rukavishnikov	Salyut 1 — Docking failed due to a docking system failure	Failure
10	Soyuz 11	Soyuz 7K-OKS; 11F615A8 #32	6 June 1971	30 June 1971	(Soviet Union) Georgy Dobrovolsky (Soviet Union) Vladislav Volkov (Soviet Union) Viktor Patsayev (Crew died during reentry due to depressurization of landing module)	Salyut 1	Failure
—	Kosmos 496	Soyuz 7K-T; 11F615A8 #33A	26 June 1972	2 July 1972	None		Success
—	Kosmos 573	Soyuz 7K-T; 11F615A8 #36	15 June 1973	17 June 1973	None		Success
11	Soyuz 12	Soyuz 7K-T; 11F615A8 #37	27 September 1973	29 September 1973	(Soviet Union) Vasili Lazarev (Soviet Union) Oleg Makarov		Success
—	Kosmos 613	Soyuz 7K-T; 11F615A8 #34A	30 November 1973	29 January 1974	None		Success
12	Soyuz 13	Soyuz 7K-T; 11F615A8 #33	18 December 1973	26 December 1973	(Soviet Union) Pyotr Klimuk (Soviet Union) Valentin Lebedev		Success
—	Kosmos 638	Soyuz 7K-TM; 11F615A12 #71	3 April 1974	13 April 1974	None		Success
—	Kosmos 656	Soyuz 7K-T/A9; 11F615A9 #61	27 May 1974	29 May 1974	None		Success
13	Soyuz 14	Soyuz 7K-T/A9; 11F615A9 #62	3 July 1974	19 July 1974	(Soviet Union) Pavel Popovich (Soviet Union) Yuri Artyukhin	Salyut 3	Success
—	Kosmos 672	Soyuz 7K-TM; 11F615A12 #72	12 August 1974	18 August 1974	None		Success
14	Soyuz 15	Soyuz 7K-T/A9; 11F615A9 #63	26 August 1974	28 August 1974	(Soviet Union) Gennadi Sarafanov (Soviet Union) Lev Dyomin	Salyut 3 — Docking failed due to malfunctioning of Igla docking system	Failure
15	Soyuz 16	Soyuz 7K-TM; 11F615A12 #73	2 December 1974	8 December 1974	(Soviet Union) Anatoly Filipchenko (Soviet Union) Nikolai Rukavishnikov		Success
16	Soyuz 17	Soyuz 7K-T; 11F615A8 #38	11 January 1975	9 February 1975	(Soviet Union) Aleksei Gubarev (Soviet Union) Georgi Grechko	Salyut 4	Success
17	Soyuz 18A	Soyuz 7K-T; 11F615A8 #39	5 April 1975	5 April 1975	(Soviet Union) Vasili Lazarev (Soviet Union) Oleg Makarov (Aborted launch at T+295 seconds; crew survived but experienced 21 G's during descent)		Failure
18	Soyuz 18	Soyuz 7K-T; 11F615A8 #40	24 May 1975	26 July 1975	(Soviet Union) Pyotr Klimuk (Soviet Union) Vitali Sevastyanov	Salyut 4	Success
19	Soyuz 19	Soyuz 7K-TM; 11F615A12 #75	15 July 1975	21 July 1975	(Soviet Union) Alexei Leonov (Soviet Union) Valeri Kubasov	Apollo	Success
—	Soyuz 20	Soyuz 7K-T/A9; 11F615A9 #64	17 November 1975	16 February 1976	None	Salyut 4	Success
20	Soyuz 21	Soyuz 7K-T; 11F615A8 #41	6 July 1976	24 August 1976	(Soviet Union) Boris Volynov (Soviet Union) Vitaly Zholobov	Salyut 5	Partial
21	Soyuz 22	Soyuz 7K-TM; 11F615A12 #74	15 September 1976	23 September 1976	(Soviet Union) Valery Bykovsky (Soviet Union) Vladimir Aksyonov		Success
22	Soyuz 23	Soyuz 7K-T/A9; 11F615A9 #65	14 October 1976	16 October 1976	(Soviet Union) Vyacheslav Zudov (Soviet Union) Valery Rozhdestvensky	Salyut 5 — Docking failed due to a docking system failure	Failure
23	Soyuz 24	Soyuz 7K-T/A9; 11F615A9 #66	7 February 1977	25 February 1977	(Soviet Union) Viktor Gorbatko (Soviet Union) Yuri Glazkov	Salyut 5	Success
24	Soyuz 25	Soyuz 7K-T; 11F615A8 #42	9 October 1977	11 October 1977	(Soviet Union) Vladimir Kovalyonok (Soviet Union) Valery Ryumin	Salyut 6 — Docking failed due to a docking system failure	Failure
25	Soyuz 26	Soyuz 7K-T; 11F615A8 #43	10 December 1977	16 January 1978	(Soviet Union) Yuri Romanenko (Soviet Union) Vladimir Dzhanibekov	Salyut 6	Success
25	Soyuz 26	Soyuz 7K-T; 11F615A8 #43	10 December 1977	16 January 1978	(Soviet Union) Georgi Grechko (Soviet Union) Oleg Makarov	Salyut 6	Success
26	Soyuz 27	Soyuz 7K-T; 11F615A8 #44	10 January 1978	16 March 1978	(Soviet Union) Georgi Grechko (Soviet Union) Oleg Makarov	Salyut 6	Success
26	Soyuz 27	Soyuz 7K-T; 11F615A8 #44	10 January 1978	16 March 1978	(Soviet Union) Yuri Romanenko (Soviet Union) Vladimir Dzhanibekov	Salyut 6	Success
27	Soyuz 28	Soyuz 7K-T; 11F615A8 #45	2 March 1978	10 March 1978	(Soviet Union) Aleksei Gubarev (Czechoslovakia) Vladimír Remek (The first international crew)	Salyut 6	Success
28	Soyuz 29	Soyuz 7K-T; 11F615A8 #46	15 June 1978	3 September 1978	(Soviet Union) Vladimir Kovalyonok (Soviet Union) Aleksandr Ivanchenkov	Salyut 6	Success
28	Soyuz 29	Soyuz 7K-T; 11F615A8 #46	15 June 1978	3 September 1978	(Soviet Union) Valery Bykovsky (East Germany) Sigmund Jähn	Salyut 6	Success
29	Soyuz 30	Soyuz 7K-T/A9; 11F615A9 #67	27 June 1978	5 July 1978	(Soviet Union) Pyotr Klimuk (Poland) Mirosław Hermaszewski	Salyut 6	Success
30	Soyuz 31	Soyuz 7K-T; 11F615A8 #47	26 August 1978	2 November 1978	(Soviet Union) Valery Bykovsky (East Germany) Sigmund Jähn	Salyut 6	Success
30	Soyuz 31	Soyuz 7K-T; 11F615A8 #47	26 August 1978	2 November 1978	(Soviet Union) Vladimir Kovalyonok (Soviet Union) Aleksandr Ivanchenkov	Salyut 6	Success
31	Soyuz 32	Soyuz 7K-T; 11F615A8 #48	25 February 1979	13 June 1979	(Soviet Union) Vladimir Lyakhov (Soviet Union) Valery Ryumin	Salyut 6	Success
31	Soyuz 32	Soyuz 7K-T; 11F615A8 #48	25 February 1979	13 June 1979	Landing without crew	Salyut 6	Success
32	Soyuz 33	Soyuz 7K-T; 11F615A8 #49	10 April 1979	12 April 1979	(Soviet Union) Nikolai Rukavishnikov (Bulgaria) Georgi Ivanov	Salyut 6 — Docking failed due to main engine and Igla docking system failure; deorbit burn was made using the backup engine	Failure
33	Soyuz 34	Soyuz 7K-T; 11F615A8 #50	6 June 1979	19 August 1979	Start without crew	Salyut 6	Success
33	Soyuz 34	Soyuz 7K-T; 11F615A8 #50	6 June 1979	19 August 1979	(Soviet Union) Vladimir Lyakhov (Soviet Union) Valery Ryumin	Salyut 6	Success
34	Soyuz 35	Soyuz 7K-T; 11F615A8 #51	9 April 1980	3 June 1980	(Soviet Union) Leonid Popov (Soviet Union) Valery Ryumin	Salyut 6	Success
34	Soyuz 35	Soyuz 7K-T; 11F615A8 #51	9 April 1980	3 June 1980	(Soviet Union) Valery Kubasov (Hungary) Bertalan Farkas	Salyut 6	Success
35	Soyuz 36	Soyuz 7K-T; 11F615A8 #52	26 May 1980	31 July 1980	(Soviet Union) Valery Kubasov (Hungary) Bertalan Farkas	Salyut 6	Success
35	Soyuz 36	Soyuz 7K-T; 11F615A8 #52	26 May 1980	31 July 1980	(Soviet Union) Viktor Gorbatko (Vietnam) Pham Tuân	Salyut 6	Success
37	Soyuz 37	Soyuz 7K-T; 11F615A8 #53	23 July 1980	11 October 1980	(Soviet Union) Viktor Gorbatko (Vietnam) Pham Tuân	Salyut 6	Success
37	Soyuz 37	Soyuz 7K-T; 11F615A8 #53	23 July 1980	11 October 1980	(Soviet Union) Leonid Popov (Soviet Union) Valery Ryumin	Salyut 6	Success
38	Soyuz 38	Soyuz 7K-T; 11F615A8 #54	18 September 1980	26 September 1980	(Soviet Union) Yuri Romanenko (Cuba) Arnaldo Tamayo Méndez	Salyut 6	Success
41	Soyuz 39	Soyuz 7K-T; 11F615A8 #55	22 March 1981	30 March 1981	(Soviet Union) Vladimir Dzhanibekov (Mongolian People's Republic) Jügderdemidiin Gürragchaa	Salyut 6	Success
42	Soyuz 40	Soyuz 7K-T; 11F615A8 #56	14 May 1981	22 May 1981	(Soviet Union) Leonid Popov (Romania) Dumitru Prunariu	Salyut 6	Success

=== Soyuz 7K-L1 ===
Spacecraft designed for Soviet human circumlunar missions. Missions are included under the Zond programme.

No.	Mission	Spacecraft	Date of launch	Date of landing	Crew (launch/landing)	Docking	Outcome
—	Kosmos 146	Soyuz 7K-L1; 11F91 #2P	10 March 1967	18 March 1967	None		Success
—	Kosmos 154	Soyuz 7K-L1; 11F91 #3P	8 April 1967	10 April 1967	None		Failure
—	Soyuz 7K-L1 No.4L	Soyuz 7K-L1; 11F91 #4L	27 September 1967		None (rocket failure)		Failure
—	Soyuz 7K-L1 No.5L	Soyuz 7K-L1; 11F91 #5L	22 November 1967		None (rocket failure)		Failure
—	Zond 4	Soyuz 7K-L1; 11F91 #6L	2 March 1968	7 March 1968	None		Partial
—	Soyuz 7K-L1 No.7L	Soyuz 7K-L1; 11F91 #7L	22 April 1968		None (rocket failure)		Failure
—	Soyuz 7K-L1 No.8L	Soyuz 7K-L1; 11F91 #8L	21 July 1968		None (rocket exploded on launch pad)		Failure
—	Zond 5	Soyuz 7K-L1; 11F91 #9L	14 September 1968	22 September 1968	None		Success
—	Zond 6	Soyuz 7K-L1; 11F91 #12L	10 November 1968	17 November 1968	None		Partial
—	Soyuz 7K-L1 No.13L	Soyuz 7K-L1; 11F91 #13L	20 January 1969		None (rocket failure)		Failure
—	Zond-M 1	Soyuz 7K-L1S; 11F92 #3	21 February 1969		None (rocket failure)		Failure
—	Zond-M 2	Soyuz 7K-L1S; 11F92 #4	3 July 1969		None (rocket failure)		Failure
—	Zond 7	Soyuz 7K-L1; 11F91 #11L	7 August 1969	14 August 1969	None		Success
—	Soyuz 7K-L1E No.1	Soyuz 7K-L1E; 7K-L1E #1K	28 November 1969		None (rocket failure)		Failure
—	Zond 8	Soyuz 7K-L1; 11F91 #14L	20 October 1970	27 October 1970	None		Success
—	Kosmos 382	Soyuz 7K-L1E "Zond-LOK"; 7K-L1E #2K	2 December 1970	In orbit	None		In orbit

=== Soyuz 7K-LOK ===
Spacecraft designed for Soviet human lunar orbital and landing missions.

No.	Mission	Spacecraft	Date of launch	Date of landing	Crew (launch/landing)	Docking	Outcome
—	Soyuz 7K-LOK No.1	Soyuz 7K-LOK	26 June 1971		None (rocket failure)		Failure
—	Soyuz 7K-LOK No.2	Soyuz 7K-LOK	23 November 1972		None (rocket failure)		Failure

== Soyuz T (1979–1986) ==
No.	Mission	Spacecraft	Date of launch	Date of landing	Crew (launch/landing)	Docking	Outcome
—	Kosmos 670	Soyuz 7K-S; 11F732 #1	6 August 1974	9 August 1974	None		Success
—	Kosmos 772	Soyuz 7K-S; 11F732 #2	29 September 1975	2 October 1975	None		Failure
—	Kosmos 869	Soyuz 7K-S; 11F732 #3	29 November 1976	17 December 1976	None		Failure
—	Kosmos 1001	Soyuz T 11F732 #4	4 April 1978	15 April 1978	None		Failure
—	Kosmos 1074	Soyuz T 11F732 #5	31 January 1979	1 April 1979	None		Success
—	Soyuz T-1	Soyuz T 11F732 #6	16 December 1979	25 March 1980	None	Salyut 6	Success
36	Soyuz T-2	Soyuz T 11F732 #7	5 June 1980	9 June 1980	(Soviet Union) Yury Malyshev (Soviet Union) Vladimir Aksyonov	Salyut 6	Success
39	Soyuz T-3	Soyuz T 11F732 #8	27 November 1980	10 December 1980	(Soviet Union) Leonid Kizim (Soviet Union) Oleg Makarov (Soviet Union) Gennady Strekalov	Salyut 6	Success
40	Soyuz T-4	Soyuz T 11F732 #10	12 March 1981	26 May 1981	(Soviet Union) Vladimir Kovalyonok (Soviet Union) Viktor Savinykh	Salyut 6	Success
43	Soyuz T-5	Soyuz T 11F732 #11	13 May 1982	27 August 1982	(Soviet Union) Anatoli Berezovoy (Soviet Union) Valentin Lebedev	Salyut 7	Success
43	Soyuz T-5	Soyuz T 11F732 #11	13 May 1982	27 August 1982	(Soviet Union) Leonid Popov (Soviet Union) Aleksandr Serebrov (Soviet Union) Svetlana Savitskaya	Salyut 7	Success
44	Soyuz T-6	Soyuz T 11F732 #9	24 June 1982	2 July 1982	(Soviet Union) Vladimir Dzhanibekov (Soviet Union) Aleksandr Ivanchenkov (France) Jean-Loup Chrétien	Salyut 7	Success
45	Soyuz T-7	Soyuz T 11F732 #12	19 August 1982	10 December 1982	(Soviet Union) Leonid Popov (Soviet Union) Aleksandr Serebrov (Soviet Union) Svetlana Savitskaya	Salyut 7	Success
45	Soyuz T-7	Soyuz T 11F732 #12	19 August 1982	10 December 1982	(Soviet Union) Anatoli Berezovoy (Soviet Union) Valentin Lebedev	Salyut 7	Success
46	Soyuz T-8	Soyuz T 11F732 #13	22 April 1983	24 April 1983	(Soviet Union) Vladimir Titov (Soviet Union) Gennady Strekalov (Soviet Union) Aleksandr Serebrov	Salyut 7 — Docking failed due to a broken antenna	Failure
47	Soyuz T-9	Soyuz T 11F732 #14	27 June 1983	23 November 1983	(Soviet Union) Vladimir Lyakhov (Soviet Union) Aleksandr Aleksandrov	Salyut 7	Success
48	Soyuz T-10A	Soyuz T 11F732 #16	26 September 1983	26 September 1983	(Soviet Union) Vladimir Titov (Soviet Union) Gennady Strekalov (Rocket caught fire at the pad, launch escape system activated two seconds before explosion; the duration of the flight (due to the launch escape system) was 5 min, 13 sec)		Failure
49	Soyuz T-10	Soyuz T 11F732 #15	8 February 1984	11 April 1984	(Soviet Union) Leonid Kizim (Soviet Union) Vladimir Solovyov (Soviet Union) Oleg Atkov	Salyut 7	Success
49	Soyuz T-10	Soyuz T 11F732 #15	8 February 1984	11 April 1984	(Soviet Union) Yury Malyshev (Soviet Union) Gennady Strekalov (India) Rakesh Sharma	Salyut 7	Success
50	Soyuz T-11	Soyuz T 11F732 #17	3 April 1984	2 October 1984	(Soviet Union) Yury Malyshev (Soviet Union) Gennady Strekalov (India) Rakesh Sharma	Salyut 7	Success
50	Soyuz T-11	Soyuz T 11F732 #17	3 April 1984	2 October 1984	(Soviet Union) Leonid Kizim (Soviet Union) Vladimir Solovyov (Soviet Union) Oleg Atkov	Salyut 7	Success
51	Soyuz T-12	Soyuz T 11F732 #18	17 July 1984	29 July 1984	(Soviet Union) Vladimir Dzhanibekov (Soviet Union) Svetlana Savitskaya (Soviet Union) Igor Volk	Salyut 7	Success
52	Soyuz T-13	Soyuz T 11F732 #19	6 June 1985	26 September 1986	(Soviet Union) Vladimir Dzhanibekov (Soviet Union) Viktor Savinykh	Salyut 7 — Docked in manual mode, due to the loss of power of the station on 11 February 1985. The mission was intended to restore the power on the station	Success
52	Soyuz T-13	Soyuz T 11F732 #19	6 June 1985	26 September 1986	(Soviet Union) Vladimir Dzhanibekov (Soviet Union) Georgi Grechko	Salyut 7 — Docked in manual mode, due to the loss of power of the station on 11 February 1985. The mission was intended to restore the power on the station	Success
53	Soyuz T-14	Soyuz T 11F732 #20	17 September 1985	21 November 1985	(Soviet Union) Vladimir Vasyutin (Soviet Union) Georgi Grechko (Soviet Union) Alexander Volkov	Salyut 7	Success
53	Soyuz T-14	Soyuz T 11F732 #20	17 September 1985	21 November 1985	(Soviet Union) Vladimir Vasyutin (Soviet Union) Viktor Savinykh (Soviet Union) Alexander Volkov	Salyut 7	Success
54	Soyuz T-15	Soyuz T 11F732 #21	13 March 1986	16 July 1986	(Soviet Union) Leonid Kizim (Soviet Union) Vladimir Solovyov	Mir → Salyut 7 → Mir — First flight between two stations	Success

== Soyuz TM (1987–2002) ==
No.	Mission	Spacecraft	Date of launch	Date of landing	Crew (launch/landing)	Docking	Outcome
—	Soyuz TM-1	Soyuz TM; 11F732A51 #51	21 May 1986	30 May 1986	None	Mir	Success
55	Soyuz TM-2	Soyuz TM; 11F732A51 #52	5 February 1987	30 July 1987	(Soviet Union) Yuri Romanenko (Soviet Union) Aleksandr Laveykin	Mir	Success
55	Soyuz TM-2	Soyuz TM; 11F732A51 #52	5 February 1987	30 July 1987	(Soviet Union) Aleksandr Viktorenko (Soviet Union) Aleksandr Laveykin (Syria) Muhammed Faris	Mir	Success
56	Soyuz TM-3	Soyuz TM; 11F732A51 #53	22 July 1987	29 December 1987	(Soviet Union) Alexander Viktorenko (Soviet Union) Aleksandr Aleksandrov (Syria) Muhammed Faris	Mir	Success
56	Soyuz TM-3	Soyuz TM; 11F732A51 #53	22 July 1987	29 December 1987	(Soviet Union) Yuri Romanenko (Soviet Union) Aleksandr Aleksandrov (Soviet Union) Anatoli Levchenko	Mir	Success
57	Soyuz TM-4	Soyuz TM; 11F732A51 #54	21 December 1987	17 June 1988	(Soviet Union) Vladimir Titov (Soviet Union) Musa Manarov (Soviet Union) Anatoli Levchenko	Mir	Success
57	Soyuz TM-4	Soyuz TM; 11F732A51 #54	21 December 1987	17 June 1988	(Soviet Union) Anatoly Solovyev (Soviet Union) Viktor Savinykh (Bulgaria) Aleksandr Aleksandrov	Mir	Success
58	Soyuz TM-5	Soyuz TM; 11F732A51 #55	7 June 1988	7 September 1988	(Soviet Union) Anatoly Solovyev (Soviet Union) Viktor Savinykh (Bulgaria) Aleksandr Aleksandrov	Mir	Success
58	Soyuz TM-5	Soyuz TM; 11F732A51 #55	7 June 1988	7 September 1988	(Soviet Union) Vladimir Lyakhov (Afghanistan) Abdul Mohmand	Mir	Success
59	Soyuz TM-6	Soyuz TM; 11F732A51 #56	29 August 1988	21 December 1988	(Soviet Union) Vladimir Lyakhov (Soviet Union) Valeri Polyakov (Afghanistan) Abdul Mohmand	Mir	Success
59	Soyuz TM-6	Soyuz TM; 11F732A51 #56	29 August 1988	21 December 1988	(Soviet Union) Vladimir Titov (Soviet Union) Musa Manarov (France) Jean-Loup Chrétien	Mir	Success
60	Soyuz TM-7	Soyuz TM; 11F732A51 #57	26 November 1988	27 April 1989	(Soviet Union) Alexander Volkov (Soviet Union) Sergei Krikalyov (France) Jean-Loup Chrétien	Mir	Success
60	Soyuz TM-7	Soyuz TM; 11F732A51 #57	26 November 1988	27 April 1989	(Soviet Union) Alexander Volkov (Soviet Union) Sergei Krikalyov (Soviet Union) Valeri Polyakov	Mir	Success
61	Soyuz TM-8	Soyuz TM; 11F732A51 #58	5 September 1989	19 February 1990	(Soviet Union) Alexander Viktorenko (Soviet Union) Aleksandr Serebrov	Mir	Success
62	Soyuz TM-9	Soyuz TM; 11F732A51 #60	11 February 1990	9 August 1990	(Soviet Union) Anatoly Solovyev (Soviet Union) Aleksandr Balandin	Mir	Success
63	Soyuz TM-10	Soyuz TM; 11F732A51 #61A	1 August 1990	10 December 1990	(Soviet Union) Gennadi Manakov (Soviet Union) Gennady Strekalov	Mir	Success
63	Soyuz TM-10	Soyuz TM; 11F732A51 #61A	1 August 1990	10 December 1990	(Soviet Union) Gennadi Manakov (Soviet Union) Gennady Strekalov (Japan) Toyohiro Akiyama (reporter)	Mir	Success
64	Soyuz TM-11	Soyuz TM; 11F732A51 #61	2 December 1990	26 May 1991	(Soviet Union) Viktor Afanasyev (Soviet Union) Musa Manarov (Japan) Toyohiro Akiyama (reporter)	Mir	Success
64	Soyuz TM-11	Soyuz TM; 11F732A51 #61	2 December 1990	26 May 1991	(Soviet Union) Viktor Afanasyev (Soviet Union) Musa Manarov (United Kingdom) Helen Sharman	Mir	Success
65	Soyuz TM-12	Soyuz TM; 11F732A51 #62	18 May 1991	10 October 1991	(Soviet Union) Anatoly Artsebarsky (Soviet Union) Sergei Krikalev (United Kingdom) Helen Sharman	Mir	Success
65	Soyuz TM-12	Soyuz TM; 11F732A51 #62	18 May 1991	10 October 1991	(Soviet Union) Anatoly Artsebarsky (Soviet Union) Toktar Aubakirov (Austria) Franz Viehböck	Mir	Success
66	Soyuz TM-13	Soyuz TM; 11F732A51 #63	2 October 1991	25 March 1992	(Soviet Union) Alexander Volkov (Soviet Union) Toktar Aubakirov (Austria) Franz Viehböck	Mir	Success
66	Soyuz TM-13	Soyuz TM; 11F732A51 #63	2 October 1991	25 March 1992	(Russia) Alexander Volkov (Russia) Sergei Krikalev (Germany) Klaus-Dietrich Flade	Mir	Success
67	Soyuz TM-14	Soyuz TM; 11F732A51 #64	17 March 1992	10 August 1992	(Russia) Alexander Viktorenko (Russia) Alexander Kaleri (Germany) Klaus-Dietrich Flade	Mir	Success
67	Soyuz TM-14	Soyuz TM; 11F732A51 #64	17 March 1992	10 August 1992	(Russia) Alexander Viktorenko (Russia) Alexander Kaleri (France) Michel Tognini	Mir	Success
68	Soyuz TM-15	Soyuz TM; 11F732A51 #65	27 July 1992	1 February 1993	(Russia) Anatoly Solovyev (Russia) Sergei Avdeyev (France) Michel Tognini	Mir	Success
68	Soyuz TM-15	Soyuz TM; 11F732A51 #65	27 July 1992	1 February 1993	(Russia) Anatoly Solovyev (Russia) Sergei Avdeyev	Mir	Success
69	Soyuz TM-16	Soyuz TM; 11F732A51 #101	24 January 1993	22 July 1993	(Russia) Gennadi Manakov (Russia) Alexander Poleshchuk	Mir	Success
69	Soyuz TM-16	Soyuz TM; 11F732A51 #101	24 January 1993	22 July 1993	(Russia) Gennadi Manakov (Russia) Alexander Poleshchuk (France) Jean-Pierre Haigneré	Mir	Success
70	Soyuz TM-17	Soyuz TM; 11F732A51 #66	1 July 1993	14 January 1994	(Russia) Vasili Tsibliyev (Russia) Aleksandr Serebrov (France) Jean-Pierre Haigneré	Mir	Success
70	Soyuz TM-17	Soyuz TM; 11F732A51 #66	1 July 1993	14 January 1994	(Russia) Vasili Tsibliyev (Russia) Aleksandr Serebrov	Mir	Success
71	Soyuz TM-18	Soyuz TM; 11F732A51 #67	8 January 1994	9 July 1994	(Russia) Viktor Afanasyev (Russia) Yury Usachov (Russia) Valeri Polyakov	Mir	Success
71	Soyuz TM-18	Soyuz TM; 11F732A51 #67	8 January 1994	9 July 1994	(Russia) Viktor Afanasyev (Russia) Yury Usachov	Mir	Success
72	Soyuz TM-19	Soyuz TM; 11F732A51 #68	1 July 1994	4 November 1994	(Russia) Yuri Malenchenko (Russia) Talgat Musabayev	Mir	Success
72	Soyuz TM-19	Soyuz TM; 11F732A51 #68	1 July 1994	4 November 1994	(Russia) Yuri Malenchenko (Russia) Talgat Musabayev (Germany) Ulf Merbold	Mir	Success
73	Soyuz TM-20	Soyuz TM; 11F732A51 #69	4 October 1994	22 March 1995	(Russia) Alexander Viktorenko (Russia) Yelena Kondakova (Germany) Ulf Merbold	Mir	Success
73	Soyuz TM-20	Soyuz TM; 11F732A51 #69	4 October 1994	22 March 1995	(Russia) Alexander Viktorenko (Russia) Yelena Kondakova (Russia) Valeri Polyakov	Mir	Success
74	Soyuz TM-21	Soyuz TM; 11F732A51 #70	14 March 1995	1 September 1995	(Russia) Vladimir Dezhurov (Russia) Gennady Strekalov (United States) Norman Thagard	Mir	Success
74	Soyuz TM-21	Soyuz TM; 11F732A51 #70	14 March 1995	1 September 1995	(Russia) Anatoly Solovyev (Russia) Nikolai Budarin	Mir	Success
75	Soyuz TM-22	Soyuz TM; 11F732A51 #71	3 September 1995	29 February 1996	(Russia) Yuri Gidzenko (Russia) Sergei Avdeyev (Germany) Thomas Reiter	Mir	Success
76	Soyuz TM-23	Soyuz TM; 11F732A51 #72	21 February 1996	2 September 1996	(Russia) Yuri Onufrienko (Russia) Yury Usachov	Mir	Success
76	Soyuz TM-23	Soyuz TM; 11F732A51 #72	21 February 1996	2 September 1996	(Russia) Yuri Onufrienko (Russia) Yury Usachov (France) Claudie Haigneré	Mir	Success
77	Soyuz TM-24	Soyuz TM; 11F732A51 #73	17 August 1996	2 March 1997	(Russia) Valery Korzun (Russia) Aleksandr Kaleri (France) Claudie Haigneré	Mir	Success
77	Soyuz TM-24	Soyuz TM; 11F732A51 #73	17 August 1996	2 March 1997	(Russia) Valery Korzun (Russia) Aleksandr Kaleri (Germany) Reinhold Ewald	Mir	Success
78	Soyuz TM-25	Soyuz TM; 11F732A51 #74	10 February 1997	14 August 1997	(Russia) Vasili Tsibliyev (Russia) Aleksandr Lazutkin (Germany) Reinhold Ewald	Mir	Success
78	Soyuz TM-25	Soyuz TM; 11F732A51 #74	10 February 1997	14 August 1997	(Russia) Vasili Tsibliyev (Russia) Aleksandr Lazutkin	Mir	Success
79	Soyuz TM-26	Soyuz TM; 11F732A51 #75	5 August 1997	19 February 1998	(Russia) Anatoly Solovyev (Russia) Pavel Vinogradov	Mir	Success
79	Soyuz TM-26	Soyuz TM; 11F732A51 #75	5 August 1997	19 February 1998	(Russia) Anatoly Solovyev (Russia) Pavel Vinogradov (France) Léopold Eyharts	Mir	Success
80	Soyuz TM-27	Soyuz TM; 11F732A51 #76	29 January 1998	25 August 1998	(Russia) Talgat Musabayev (Russia) Nikolai Budarin (France) Léopold Eyharts	Mir	Success
80	Soyuz TM-27	Soyuz TM; 11F732A51 #76	29 January 1998	25 August 1998	(Russia) Talgat Musabayev (Russia) Nikolai Budarin (Russia) Yuri Baturin	Mir	Success
81	Soyuz TM-28	Soyuz TM; 11F732A51 #77	13 August 1998	28 February 1999	(Russia) Gennady Padalka (Russia) Sergei Avdeyev (Russia) Yuri Baturin	Mir	Success
81	Soyuz TM-28	Soyuz TM; 11F732A51 #77	13 August 1998	28 February 1999	(Russia) Gennady Padalka (Slovakia) Ivan Bella	Mir	Success
82	Soyuz TM-29	Soyuz TM; 11F732A51 #78	20 February 1999	28 August 1999	(Russia) Viktor Afanasyev (France) Jean-Pierre Haigneré (Slovakia) Ivan Bella	Mir	Success
82	Soyuz TM-29	Soyuz TM; 11F732A51 #78	20 February 1999	28 August 1999	(Russia) Viktor Afanasyev (France) Jean-Pierre Haigneré (Russia) Sergei Avdeyev	Mir	Success
83	Soyuz TM-30	Soyuz TM; 11F732A51 #204	4 April 2000	16 June 2000	(Russia) Sergei Zalyotin (Russia) Aleksandr Kaleri	Mir	Success
84	Soyuz TM-31	Soyuz TM; 11F732A51 #205	31 October 2000	6 May 2001	(Russia) Yuri Gidzenko (Russia) Sergei Krikalev (United States) William Shepherd	ISS	Success
84	Soyuz TM-31	Soyuz TM; 11F732A51 #205	31 October 2000	6 May 2001	(Russia) Talgat Musabayev (Russia) Yuri Baturin (United States) Dennis Tito (tourist)	ISS	Success
85	Soyuz TM-32	Soyuz TM; 11F732A51 #206	28 April 2001	31 October 2001	(Russia) Talgat Musabayev (Russia) Yuri Baturin (United States) Dennis Tito (tourist)	ISS	Success
85	Soyuz TM-32	Soyuz TM; 11F732A51 #206	28 April 2001	31 October 2001	(Russia) Viktor Afanasyev (France) Claudie Haigneré (Russia) Konstantin Kozeyev	ISS	Success
86	Soyuz TM-33	Soyuz TM; 11F732A51 #207	21 October 2001	5 May 2002	(Russia) Viktor Afanasyev (France) Claudie Haigneré (Russia) Konstantin Kozeyev	ISS	Success
86	Soyuz TM-33	Soyuz TM; 11F732A51 #207	21 October 2001	5 May 2002	(Russia) Yuri Gidzenko (Italy) Roberto Vittori (South Africa) / (United Kingdom) Mark Shuttleworth (tourist)	ISS	Success
87	Soyuz TM-34	Soyuz TM; 11F732A51 #208	25 April 2002	10 November 2002	(Russia) Yuri Gidzenko (Italy) Roberto Vittori (South Africa) / (United Kingdom) Mark Shuttleworth (tourist)	ISS	Success
87	Soyuz TM-34	Soyuz TM; 11F732A51 #208	25 April 2002	10 November 2002	(Russia) Sergei Zalyotin (Belgium) Frank De Winne (Russia) Yury Lonchakov	ISS	Success

== Soyuz TMA (2002–2012) ==
No.	Mission	Spacecraft	Date of launch	Date of landing	Crew (launch/landing)	Docking	Outcome
88	Soyuz TMA-1	Soyuz TMA; 11F732A17 #211	30 October 2002	4 May 2003	(Russia) Sergei Zalyotin (Belgium) Frank De Winne (Russia) Yury Lonchakov	ISS	Success
88	Soyuz TMA-1	Soyuz TMA; 11F732A17 #211	30 October 2002	4 May 2003	(Russia) Nikolai Budarin (United States) Kenneth Bowersox (United States) Donald Pettit	ISS	Success
89	Soyuz TMA-2	Soyuz TMA; 11F732A17 #212	26 April 2003	28 October 2003	(Russia) Yuri Malenchenko (United States) Edward Tsang Lu	ISS	Success
89	Soyuz TMA-2	Soyuz TMA; 11F732A17 #212	26 April 2003	28 October 2003	(Russia) Yuri Malenchenko (United States) Edward Tsang Lu (Spain) Pedro Duque	ISS	Success
90	Soyuz TMA-3	Soyuz TMA; 11F732A17 #213	18 October 2003	30 April 2004	(Russia) Alexander Kaleri (United Kingdom) / (United States) Michael Foale (Spain) Pedro Duque	ISS	Success
90	Soyuz TMA-3	Soyuz TMA; 11F732A17 #213	18 October 2003	30 April 2004	(Russia) Alexander Kaleri (United Kingdom) / (United States) Michael Foale (Netherlands) André Kuipers	ISS	Success
91	Soyuz TMA-4	Soyuz TMA; 11F732A17 #214	19 April 2004	24 October 2004	(Russia) Gennady Padalka (United States) Michael Fincke (Netherlands) André Kuipers	ISS	Success
91	Soyuz TMA-4	Soyuz TMA; 11F732A17 #214	19 April 2004	24 October 2004	(Russia) Gennady Padalka (United States) Michael Fincke (Russia) Yuri Shargin	ISS	Success
92	Soyuz TMA-5	Soyuz TMA; 11F732A17 #215	14 October 2004	24 April 2005	(Russia) Salizhan Sharipov (United States) Leroy Chiao (Russia) Yuri Shargin	ISS	Success
92	Soyuz TMA-5	Soyuz TMA; 11F732A17 #215	14 October 2004	24 April 2005	(Russia) Salizhan Sharipov (United States) Leroy Chiao (Italy) Roberto Vittori	ISS	Success
93	Soyuz TMA-6	Soyuz TMA; 11F732A17 #216	15 April 2005	15 October 2005	(Russia) Sergei Krikalev (United States) John Phillips (Italy) Roberto Vittori	ISS	Success
93	Soyuz TMA-6	Soyuz TMA; 11F732A17 #216	15 April 2005	15 October 2005	(Russia) Sergei Krikalev (United States) John Phillips (United States) Gregory Olsen (tourist)	ISS	Success
94	Soyuz TMA-7	Soyuz TMA; 11F732A17 #217	1 October 2005	8 April 2006	(Russia) Valery Tokarev (United States) William McArthur (United States) Gregory Olsen (tourist)	ISS	Success
94	Soyuz TMA-7	Soyuz TMA; 11F732A17 #217	1 October 2005	8 April 2006	(Russia) Valery Tokarev (United States) William McArthur (Brazil) Marcos Pontes	ISS	Success
95	Soyuz TMA-8	Soyuz TMA; 11F732A17 #218	30 March 2006	29 September 2006	(Russia) Pavel Vinogradov (United States) Jeffrey Williams (Brazil) Marcos Pontes	ISS	Success
95	Soyuz TMA-8	Soyuz TMA; 11F732A17 #218	30 March 2006	29 September 2006	(Russia) Pavel Vinogradov (United States) Jeffrey Williams (Iran) / (United States) Anousheh Ansari (tourist)	ISS	Success
96	Soyuz TMA-9	Soyuz TMA; 11F732A17 #219	18 September 2006	21 April 2007	(Russia) Mikhail Tyurin (United States) Michael López-Alegría (Iran) / (United States) Anousheh Ansari (tourist)	ISS	Success
96	Soyuz TMA-9	Soyuz TMA; 11F732A17 #219	18 September 2006	21 April 2007	(Russia) Mikhail Tyurin (United States) Michael López-Alegría (Hungary) / (United States) Charles Simonyi (tourist)	ISS	Success
97	Soyuz TMA-10	Soyuz TMA; 11F732A17 #220	7 April 2007	21 October 2007	(Russia) Oleg Kotov (Russia) Fyodor Yurchikhin (Hungary) / (United States) Charles Simonyi (tourist)	ISS	Success
97	Soyuz TMA-10	Soyuz TMA; 11F732A17 #220	7 April 2007	21 October 2007	(Russia) Oleg Kotov (Russia) Fyodor Yurchikhin (Malaysia) Sheikh Muszaphar Shukor	ISS	Success
98	Soyuz TMA-11	Soyuz TMA; 11F732A17 #221	10 October 2007	19 April 2008	(Russia) Yuri Malenchenko (United States) Peggy Whitson (Malaysia) Sheikh Muszaphar Shukor	ISS	Success
98	Soyuz TMA-11	Soyuz TMA; 11F732A17 #221	10 October 2007	19 April 2008	(Russia) Yuri Malenchenko (United States) Peggy Whitson (South Korea) Yi So-Yeon	ISS	Success
99	Soyuz TMA-12	Soyuz TMA; 11F732A17 #222	8 April 2008	24 October 2008	(Russia) Sergei Volkov (Russia) Oleg Kononenko (South Korea) Yi So-Yeon	ISS	Success
99	Soyuz TMA-12	Soyuz TMA; 11F732A17 #222	8 April 2008	24 October 2008	(Russia) Sergei Volkov (Russia) Oleg Kononenko (United Kingdom) / (United States) Richard Garriott (tourist)	ISS	Success
100	Soyuz TMA-13	Soyuz TMA; 11F732A17 #223	12 October 2008	8 April 2009	(Russia) Yuri Lonchakov (United States) Michael Fincke (United Kingdom) / (United States) Richard Garriott (tourist)	ISS	Success
100	Soyuz TMA-13	Soyuz TMA; 11F732A17 #223	12 October 2008	8 April 2009	(Russia) Yuri Lonchakov (United States) Michael Fincke (Hungary) / (United States) Charles Simonyi	ISS	Success
101	Soyuz TMA-14	Soyuz TMA; 11F732A17 #224	26 March 2009	11 October 2009	(Russia) Gennady Padalka (United States) Michael Barratt (Hungary) / (United States) Charles Simonyi	ISS	Success
101	Soyuz TMA-14	Soyuz TMA; 11F732A17 #224	26 March 2009	11 October 2009	(Russia) Gennady Padalka (United States) Michael Barratt (Canada) Guy Laliberté (tourist)	ISS	Success
102	Soyuz TMA-15	Soyuz TMA; 11F732A17 #225	27 May 2009	1 December 2009	(Russia) Roman Romanenko (Belgium) Frank De Winne (Canada) Robert Thirsk	ISS	Success
103	Soyuz TMA-16	Soyuz TMA; 11F732A17 #226	30 September 2009	18 March 2010	(Russia) Maksim Surayev (United States) Jeffrey Williams (Canada) Guy Laliberté (tourist)	ISS	Success
103	Soyuz TMA-16	Soyuz TMA; 11F732A17 #226	30 September 2009	18 March 2010	(Russia) Maksim Surayev (United States) Jeffrey Williams	ISS	Success
104	Soyuz TMA-17	Soyuz TMA; 11F732A17 #227	20 December 2009	2 June 2010	(Russia) Oleg Kotov (United States) Timothy Creamer (Japan) Soichi Noguchi	ISS	Success
105	Soyuz TMA-18	Soyuz TMA; 11F732A17 #228	2 April 2010	25 September 2010	(Russia) Aleksandr Skvortsov (Russia) Mikhail Korniyenko (United States) Tracy Caldwell Dyson	ISS	Success
106	Soyuz TMA-19	Soyuz TMA; 11F732A17 #229	16 June 2010	26 November 2010	(Russia) Fyodor Yurchikhin (United States) Shannon Walker (United States) Douglas H. Wheelock	ISS	Success
108	Soyuz TMA-20	Soyuz TMA; 11F732A17 #230	15 December 2010	24 May 2011	(Russia) Dmitri Kondratyev (United States) Catherine Coleman (Italy) Paolo Nespoli	ISS	Success
109	Soyuz TMA-21	Soyuz TMA; 11F732A17 #231	5 April 2011	16 September 2011	(Russia) Aleksandr Samokutyayev (Russia) Andrei Borisenko (United States) Ronald Garan	ISS	Success
111	Soyuz TMA-22	Soyuz TMA; 11F732A17 #232	14 November 2011	27 April 2012	(Russia) Anton Shkaplerov (Russia) Anatoli Ivanishin (United States) Daniel Burbank	ISS	Success

== Soyuz TMA-M (2010–2016) ==
No.	Mission	Spacecraft	Date of launch	Date of landing	Crew (launch/landing)	Docking	Outcome
107	Soyuz TMA-01M	Soyuz TMA-M; 11F732A47 #701	8 October 2010	16 March 2011	(Russia) Aleksandr Kaleri (Russia) Oleg Skripochka (United States) Scott Kelly	ISS	Success
110	Soyuz TMA-02M	Soyuz TMA-M; 11F732A47 #702	8 June 2011	22 November 2011	(Russia) Sergey Volkov (United States) Michael E. Fossum (Japan) Satoshi Furukawa	ISS	Success
112	Soyuz TMA-03M	Soyuz TMA-M; 11F732A47 #703	21 December 2011	1 July 2012	(Russia) Oleg Kononenko (Netherlands) André Kuipers (United States) Donald Pettit	ISS	Success
113	Soyuz TMA-04M	Soyuz TMA-M; 11F732A47 #705	15 May 2012	17 September 2012	(Russia) Gennady Padalka (Russia) Sergei Revin (United States) Joseph Acaba	ISS	Success
114	Soyuz TMA-05M	Soyuz TMA-M; 11F732A47 #706	15 July 2012	19 November 2012	(Russia) Yuri Malenchenko (United States) Sunita Williams (Japan) Akihiko Hoshide	ISS	Success
115	Soyuz TMA-06M	Soyuz TMA-M; 11F732A47 #707	23 October 2012	16 March 2013	(Russia) Oleg Novitskiy (Russia) Evgeny Tarelkin (United States) Kevin Ford	ISS	Success
116	Soyuz TMA-07M	Soyuz TMA-M; 11F732A47 #704A	19 December 2012	14 May 2013	(Russia) Roman Romanenko (Canada) Chris Hadfield (United States) Thomas Marshburn	ISS	Success
117	Soyuz TMA-08M	Soyuz TMA-M; 11F732A47 #708	29 March 2013	11 September 2013	(Russia) Pavel Vinogradov (Russia) Alexander Misurkin (United States) Christopher Cassidy	ISS	Success
118	Soyuz TMA-09M	Soyuz TMA-M; 11F732A47 #709	29 May 2013	11 November 2013	(Russia) Fyodor Yurchikhin (United States) Karen L. Nyberg (Italy) Luca Parmitano	ISS	Success
119	Soyuz TMA-10M	Soyuz TMA-M; 11F732A47 #710	26 September 2013	11 March 2014	(Russia) Oleg Kotov (Russia) Sergey Ryazansky (United States) Michael Hopkins	ISS	Success
120	Soyuz TMA-11M	Soyuz TMA-M; 11F732A47 #711	7 November 2013	14 May 2014	(Russia) Mikhail Tyurin (United States) Richard Mastracchio (Japan) Koichi Wakata	ISS	Success
121	Soyuz TMA-12M	Soyuz TMA-M; 11F732A47 #712	26 March 2014	11 September 2014	(Russia) Aleksandr Skvortsov (Russia) Oleg Artemyev (United States) Steven Swanson	ISS	Success
122	Soyuz TMA-13M	Soyuz TMA-M; 11F732A47 #713	28 May 2014	10 November 2014	(Russia) Maksim Surayev (United States) Reid Wiseman (Germany) Alexander Gerst	ISS	Success
123	Soyuz TMA-14M	Soyuz TMA-M; 11F732A47 #714	26 September 2014	12 March 2015	(Russia) Aleksandr Samokutyayev (Russia) Yelena Serova (United States) Barry Wilmore	ISS	Success
124	Soyuz TMA-15M	Soyuz TMA-M; 11F732A47 #715	24 November 2014	11 June 2015	(Russia) Anton Shkaplerov (Italy) Samantha Cristoforetti (United States) Terry Virts	ISS	Success
125	Soyuz TMA-16M	Soyuz TMA-M; 11F732A47 #716	27 March 2015	12 September 2015	(Russia) Gennady Padalka (Russia) Mikhail Korniyenko (United States) Scott Kelly	ISS	Success
125	Soyuz TMA-16M	Soyuz TMA-M; 11F732A47 #716	27 March 2015	12 September 2015	(Russia) Gennady Padalka (Denmark) Andreas Mogensen (Kazakhstan) Aidyn Aimbetov	ISS	Success
126	Soyuz TMA-17M	Soyuz TMA-M; 11F732A47 #717	23 July 2015	11 December 2015	(Russia) Oleg Kononenko (Japan) Kimiya Yui (United States) Kjell Lindgren	ISS	Success
127	Soyuz TMA-18M	Soyuz TMA-M; 11F732A47 #718	2 September 2015	2 March 2016	(Russia) Sergey Volkov (Denmark) Andreas Mogensen (Kazakhstan) Aidyn Aimbetov	ISS	Success
127	Soyuz TMA-18M	Soyuz TMA-M; 11F732A47 #718	2 September 2015	2 March 2016	(Russia) Sergey Volkov (Russia) Mikhail Korniyenko (United States) Scott Kelly	ISS	Success
128	Soyuz TMA-19M	Soyuz TMA-M; 11F732A47 #719	15 December 2015	18 June 2016	(Russia) Yuri Malenchenko (United States) Timothy Kopra (United Kingdom) Timothy Peake	ISS	Success
129	Soyuz TMA-20M	Soyuz TMA-M; 11F732A47 #720	19 March 2016	6 September 2016	(Russia) Aleksey Ovchinin (Russia) Oleg Skripochka (United States) Jeffrey Williams	ISS	Success

== Soyuz MS (2016–) ==
No.	Mission	Spacecraft	Date of launch	Date of landing	Crew (launch/landing)	Docking	Outcome
130	Soyuz MS-01	Soyuz MS; 11F732A48 #731	7 July 2016	30 October 2016	(Russia) Anatoli Ivanishin (Japan) Takuya Onishi (United States) Kathleen Rubins	ISS	Success
131	Soyuz MS-02	Soyuz MS; 11F732A48 #732	19 October 2016	11 April 2017	(Russia) Sergey Ryzhikov (Russia) Andrei Borisenko (United States) Robert Kimbrough	ISS	Success
132	Soyuz MS-03	Soyuz MS; 11F732A48 #733	17 November 2016	2 June 2017	(Russia) Oleg Novitskiy (France) Thomas Pesquet (United States) Peggy A. Whitson	ISS	Success
133	Soyuz MS-04	Soyuz MS; 11F732A48 #735	20 April 2017	3 September 2017	(Russia) Fyodor Yurchikhin (United States) Jack Fischer	ISS	Success
134	Soyuz MS-05	Soyuz MS; 11F732A48 #736	28 July 2017	14 December 2017	(Russia) Sergey Ryazansky (Italy) Paolo Nespoli (United States) Randolph Bresnik	ISS	Success
135	Soyuz MS-06	Soyuz MS; 11F732A48 #734	12 September 2017	28 February 2018	(Russia) Alexander Misurkin (United States) Joseph Acaba (United States) Mark Vande Hei	ISS	Success
136	Soyuz MS-07	Soyuz MS; 11F732A48 #737	17 December 2017	3 June 2018	(Russia) Anton Shkaplerov (Japan) Norishige Kanai (United States) Scott Tingle	ISS	Success
137	Soyuz MS-08	Soyuz MS; 11F732A48 #738	21 March 2018	4 October 2018	(Russia) Oleg Artemyev (United States) Richard Arnold (United States) Andrew Feustel	ISS	Success
138	Soyuz MS-09	Soyuz MS; 11F732A48 #739	6 June 2018	20 December 2018	(Russia) Sergey Prokopyev (United States) Serena Auñón-Chancellor (Germany) Alexander Gerst	ISS	Success
139	Soyuz MS-10	Soyuz MS; 11F732A48 #740	11 October 2018	11 October 2018	(Russia) Aleksey Ovchinin (United States) Nick Hague (Launch aborted at T+122 seconds due to rocket booster separation failure)		Failure
140	Soyuz MS-11	Soyuz MS; 11F732A48 #741	3 December 2018	25 June 2019	(Russia) Oleg Kononenko (United States) Anne McClain (Canada) David Saint-Jacques	ISS	Success
141	Soyuz MS-12	Soyuz MS; 11F732A48 #742	14 March 2019	3 October 2019	(Russia) Aleksey Ovchinin (United States) Nick Hague (United States) Christina Koch	ISS	Success
141	Soyuz MS-12	Soyuz MS; 11F732A48 #742	14 March 2019	3 October 2019	(Russia) Aleksey Ovchinin (United States) Nick Hague (United Arab Emirates) Hazza Al Mansouri	ISS	Success
142	Soyuz MS-13	Soyuz MS; 11F732A48 #746	20 July 2019	06 February 2020	(Russia) Aleksandr Skvortsov (Italy) Luca Parmitano (United States) Andrew R. Morgan	ISS	Success
142	Soyuz MS-13	Soyuz MS; 11F732A48 #746	20 July 2019	06 February 2020	(Russia) Aleksandr Skvortsov (Italy) Luca Parmitano (United States) Christina Koch	ISS	Success
—	Soyuz MS-14	Soyuz MS; 11F732A48 #743	22 August 2019	6 September 2019	None	ISS	Success
143	Soyuz MS-15	Soyuz MS; 11F732A48 #744	25 September 2019	17 April 2020	(Russia) Oleg Skripochka (United States) Jessica Meir (United Arab Emirates) Hazza Al Mansouri	ISS	Success
143	Soyuz MS-15	Soyuz MS; 11F732A48 #744	25 September 2019	17 April 2020	(Russia) Oleg Skripochka (United States) Jessica Meir (United States) Andrew R. Morgan	ISS	Success
144	Soyuz MS-16	Soyuz MS; 11F732A48 #745	9 April 2020	22 October 2020	(Russia) Anatoli Ivanishin (Russia) Ivan Vagner (United States) Christopher Cassidy	ISS	Success
145	Soyuz MS-17	Soyuz MS; 11F732A48 #747	14 October 2020	17 April 2021	(Russia) Sergey Ryzhikov (Russia) Sergey Kud-Sverchkov (United States) Kathleen Rubins	ISS	Success
146	Soyuz MS-18	Soyuz MS; 11F732A48 #748	9 April 2021	17 October 2021	(Russia) Oleg Novitsky (Russia) Pyotr Dubrov (United States) Mark T. Vande Hei	ISS	Success
146	Soyuz MS-18	Soyuz MS; 11F732A48 #748	9 April 2021	17 October 2021	(Russia) Oleg Novitsky (Russia) Klim Shipenko (Russia) Yulia Peresild	ISS	Success
147	Soyuz MS-19	Soyuz MS; 11F732A48 #749	5 October 2021	30 March 2022	(Russia) Anton Shkaplerov (Russia) Klim Shipenko (Russia) Yulia Peresild	ISS	Success
147	Soyuz MS-19	Soyuz MS; 11F732A48 #749	5 October 2021	30 March 2022	(Russia) Anton Shkaplerov (Russia) Pyotr Dubrov (United States) Mark T. Vande Hei	ISS	Success
148	Soyuz MS-20	Soyuz MS; 11F732A48 #752	8 December 2021	20 December 2021	(Russia) Alexander Misurkin (Japan) Yusaku Maezawa (tourist) (Japan) Yozo Hirano (tourist)	ISS	Success
149	Soyuz MS-21	Soyuz MS; 11F732A48 #750	18 March 2022	29 September 2022	(Russia) Oleg Artemyev (Russia) Denis Matveev (Russia) Sergey Korsakov	ISS	Success
150	Soyuz MS-22	Soyuz MS; 11F732A48 #751	21 September 2022	28 March 2023	(Russia) Sergey Prokopyev (Russia) Dmitry Petelin (United States) Francisco Rubio	ISS	Success
150	Soyuz MS-22	Soyuz MS; 11F732A48 #751	21 September 2022	28 March 2023	Landing without crew	ISS	Success
151	Soyuz MS-23	Soyuz MS; 11F732A48 #754	24 February 2023	27 September 2023	Start without crew	ISS	Success
151	Soyuz MS-23	Soyuz MS; 11F732A48 #754	24 February 2023	27 September 2023	(Russia) Sergey Prokopyev (Russia) Dmitry Petelin (United States) Francisco Rubio	ISS	Success
152	Soyuz MS-24	Soyuz MS; 11F732A48 #755	15 September 2023	6 April 2024	(Russia) Oleg Kononenko (Russia) Nikolai Chub (United States) Loral O'Hara	ISS	Success
152	Soyuz MS-24	Soyuz MS; 11F732A48 #755	15 September 2023	6 April 2024	(Russia) Oleg Novitsky (Belarus) Marina Vasilevskaya (United States) Loral O'Hara	ISS	Success
153	Soyuz MS-25	Soyuz MS; 11F732A48 #756	23 March 2024	23 September 2024	(Russia) Oleg Novitsky (Belarus) Marina Vasilevskaya (United States) Tracy Caldwell-Dyson	ISS	Success
153	Soyuz MS-25	Soyuz MS; 11F732A48 #756	23 March 2024	23 September 2024	(Russia) Oleg Kononenko (Russia) Nikolai Chub (United States) Tracy Caldwell-Dyson	ISS	Success
154	Soyuz MS-26	Soyuz MS; 11F732A48 #757	11 September 2024	19 April 2025	(Russia) Aleksey Ovchinin (Russia) Ivan Vagner (United States) Donald Pettit	ISS	Success
155	Soyuz MS-27	Soyuz MS; 11F732A48 #758	8 April 2025	9 December 2025	(Russia) Sergey Ryzhikov (Russia) Alexey Zubritsky (United States) Jonny Kim	ISS	Success
156	Soyuz MS-28	Soyuz MS; 11F732A48 #753	27 November 2025	26 July 2026	(Russia) Sergey Kud-Sverchkov (Russia) Sergei Mikayev (United States) Christopher Williams	ISS	Success
157	Soyuz MS-29	Soyuz MS; 11F732A48 #759	14 July 2026	1 April 2027 (Planned)	(Russia) Pyotr Dubrov (Russia) Anna Kikina (United States) Anil Menon	ISS	In progress
158	Soyuz MS-30	Soyuz MS	24 March 2027 (Planned)	November 2027 (Planned)	(Russia) Dmitry Petelin (Russia) Konstantin Borisov (United States) Deniz Burnham	ISS	Planned

== See also ==
- List of Space Shuttle missions
- Progress (spacecraft)
- Soyuz programme
- Soyuz (spacecraft)
- Soyuz(Rocket)
- Soyuz(Rocket family)
