= Kerim Kerimov =

Soviet rocket scientist

- Kərim Kərimov; Керим Керимов
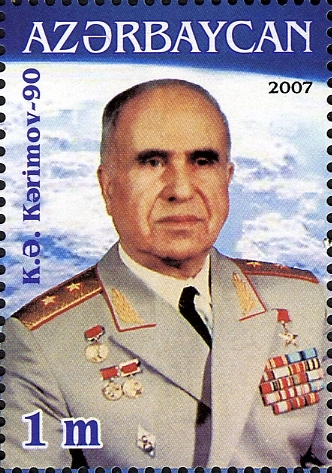
- Stamp of Azerbaijan
- Born: November 14, 1917; Baku, Baku Governorate (now Azerbaijan)
- Died: March 29, 2003 (aged 85); Moscow, Russia
- Education: Azerbaijan State Oil and Industry University
- Known for: One of the founders of the Soviet space industry and a lead architect behind many Soviet space missions. He is highly known for his work in rocket science, astronautics, space exploration.
- Awards: Hero of Socialist Labour
- Scientific career
- Fields: Engineering (Aeronautics)

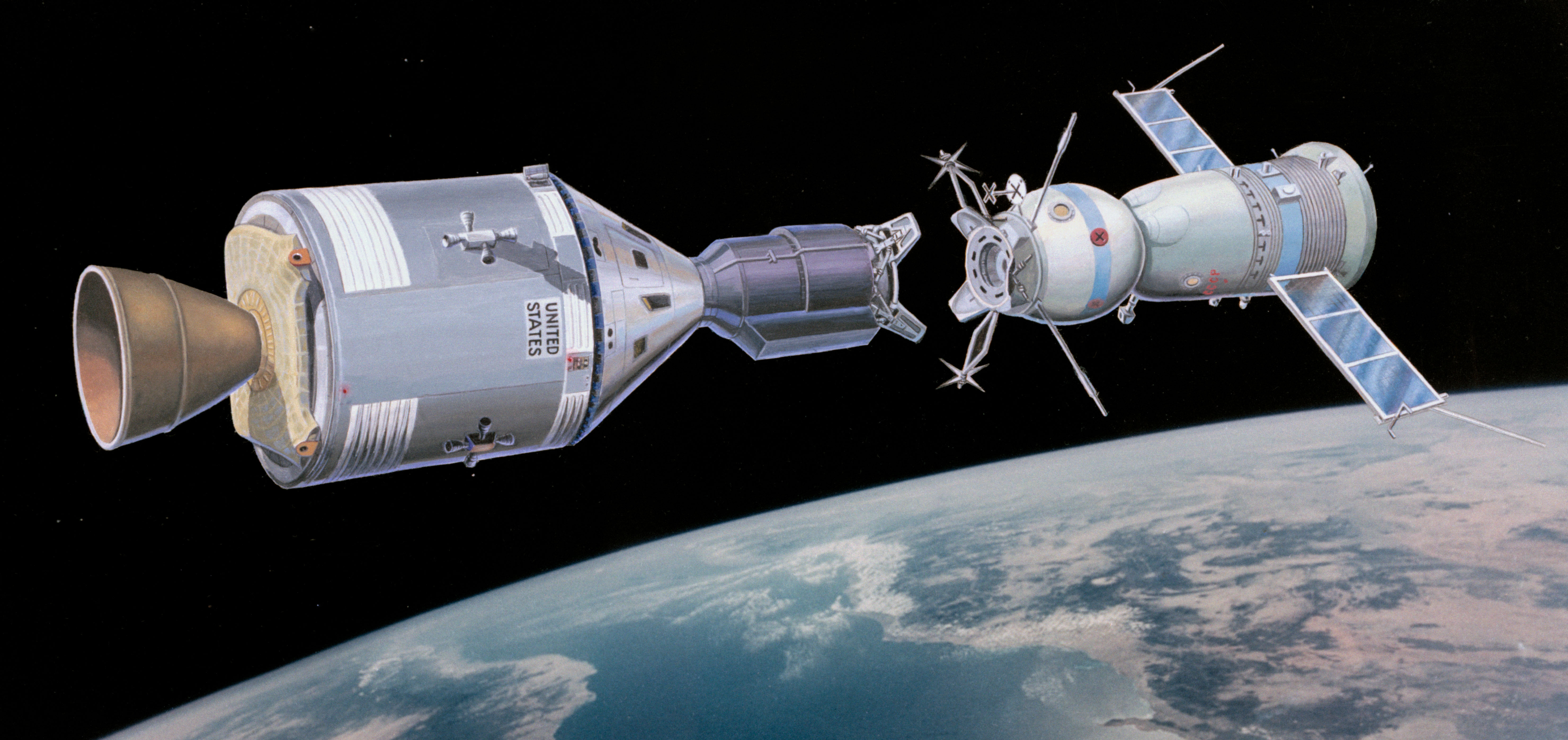
Ships "Apollo" (left) and "Union" (right). Reconstruction. Work related to the preparation of the flight in 1975, was in charge of Kerim Kerimov.

Lieutenant General Kerim Abbasali oghlu Kerimov (Azerbaijani: Kərim Abbasəli oğlu Kərimov, Russian: Керим Аббас-Алиевич Керимов; November 14, 1917 – March 29, 2003) was a Soviet and Russian engineer of Azerbaijani ethnicity and a general in the Soviet Army, who is regarded as one of the key scientists and founders in the Soviet Union's space program, and for many years a central figure in the Soviet space program.

Despite his prominent role, his identity was kept a secret from the public for most of his career. He was part of the Sputnik 1 team in 1957. As a representative of the Strategic Rocket Forces, he was a member of the State Commission on the Vostok programme, which led to the Vostok 1 flight. In the mid-1960s he was promoted to a leadership role within the space program and oversaw the successful space docking of Kosmos 186 and Kosmos 188 in 1967. Kerimov served as a project manager for the Salyut series space stations in the 1970s and served as a consultant to the Mir project later in his career.

== Early life ==
Kerim Kerimov was born on November 14, 1917, in a family of an engineer-technologist in Baku, Azerbaijan (then part of the Russian Republic). After graduating from the Azerbaijan Industrial Institute in 1942, Kerimov continued his education at Dzerzhinsky Artillery Academy, where he committed himself to design and development of rocket systems.

== Career ==
An expert in rocket technology, he worked during World War II on the inspection and acceptance of the famous Katyusha rocket launchers. His work was honoured with the Order of the Red Star. Kerim Kerimov was involved in Soviet aeronautics from its inception. After World War II, Kerimov worked on the Soviet intercontinental ballistic missile program, rising by 1960 to head the Third Directorate of the Main Directorate of Missile Weapons (GURVO) of the USSR Ministry of Defense that oversaw secret test launches. Along with other rocketry experts, he was sent to Germany in 1946 to collect information on the German V-2 rocket.

In 1964 he became head of the newly formed Central Directorate of the Space Forces (TsUKOS) of the USSR Ministry of Defense. Following the death of Sergei Korolev in 1966, Kerimov was appointed Chairman of the State Commission on Piloted Flights and headed it for 25 years (1966–1991). He supervised every stage of development and operation of both crewed space complexes as well as uncrewed interplanetary stations for former Soviet Union. Kerimov was also the Head of Chief Directorate of the Ministry of General Machine Building in 1965-1974, which was engaged in the creation of rocket systems.

A string of challenging incidents occurred at the start of his tenure as Chairman, beginning with the loss of the Kosmos 133, failed Soyuz test flights, and the Soyuz 1 fatality, which halted the crewed program for eighteen months. The government of the Soviet Union continued to press for the continuation of its crewed moon program, though, and Kerimov's successful overseeing of the Kosmos 186 and Kosmos 188 linkup earned him the rank of Lieutenant General. He was given responsibilities in managing the Salyut space station program. Progress on the project stalled after that, and the deaths of the crew of the Soyuz 11, who successfully boarded the Salyut 1 and perished prior to re-entry, required an extensive redesign of the Soyuz spacecraft.

Kerimov supported the continuation of the N1 rocket project, opposed by several influential Soviet political figures due to its repeated failures, which led to his demotion from his leading role in the space program. He continued to chair the Soyuz missions after his demotion.

== Soviet secrecy ==
As in the case of other Soviet space pioneers, the Soviet authorities for many years refused to disclose Kerimov's identity to the public. At televised space launchings, cameras always focused on the cosmonauts and not the person to whom they reported their readiness to carry out the mission. As Kerimov was a "secreted general", he was always hidden from the camera's view; only his voice was broadcast. His name remained a secret until the era of “glasnost” in Soviet Union, when he was first mentioned in the Pravda newspaper on August 7, 1987. Prior to that, he was always known as the "nameless" or "anonymous" Chairman of the Commission.

== Retirement and death ==
After his 1991 retirement, Kerimov was a Consultant to the Main Space Flights Control Centre of the Russian Federal Space Agency, and wrote The Way to Space, a history of the Soviet space program. He was a Hero of Socialist Labour, a laureate of Stalin, Lenin and State prizes of the Soviet Union, and a lieutenant general of the Soviet Army. He died March 29, 2003, in Moscow, at the age of 85.

== See also ==
- Władysław Turowicz
- "Bank of the Universe" - edited by Boltenko A. C., Kiev, 2014., publishing house "Phoenix", ISBN 978-966-136-169-9
- S. P. Korolev. Encyclopedia of life and creativity" - edited by C. A. Lopota, RSC Energia. S. P. Korolev, 2014 ISBN 978-5-906674-04-3
