= Kosmos 140 =

Soviet uncrewed flight of the Soyuz programme

- Mission type: Test flight
- Operator: Experimental Design Bureau (OKB-1)
- COSPAR ID: 1967-009A
- SATCAT no.: 02667
- Mission duration: 2 days

Spacecraft properties
- Spacecraft: Soyuz 7K-OK No.3
- Spacecraft type: Soyuz 7K-OK
- Manufacturer: Experimental Design Bureau (OKB-1)
- Launch mass: 6450 kg
- Landing mass: 2500 kg
- Dimensions: 7.13 m (23.4 ft) long 2.72 m (8 ft 11 in) wide

Start of mission
- Launch date: 7 February 1967, 03:21 GMT
- Rocket: Soyuz 11A511 s/n U15000-03
- Launch site: Baikonur, Site 1/5
- Contractor: Experimental Design Bureau (OKB-1)

End of mission
- Landing date: 9 February 1967
- Landing site: Aral Sea, Kazakhstan

Orbital parameters
- Reference system: Geocentric orbit
- Regime: Low Earth orbit
- Perigee altitude: 165.0 km
- Apogee altitude: 218.0 km
- Inclination: 51.7°
- Period: 88.5 minutes

Kosmos 140 (Russian: Космос 140 meaning Cosmos 140), Soyuz 7K-OK No.3, was an uncrewed flight of the Soyuz spacecraft. It was the third attempted test flight of the Soyuz 7K-OK model, after orbital (Kosmos 133) and launch (Soyuz 11A511) failures of the first two Soyuz spacecraft.

== History ==
The follow-up to Kosmos 133 (Soyuz 7K-OK No.2), 28 November 1966, was planned for 14 December 1966 (Soyuz 7K-OK No.1) but ended disastrously. At liftoff, the Blok A core stage of the 11A57 booster ignited, but not the strap-ons. A shutdown command was immediately sent and pad crews began to move the service towers back in place and drain the propellants. This task was completed for the core stage and strap-ons, and then about 27 minutes after the attempted launch, the launch escape system (LES) suddenly fired. Its exhaust caused the Blok I third stage propellant tanks to overheat and explode, killing one person on the ground and damaging the Soyuz and core stage/strap-ons beyond repair. LC-31 was also badly damaged and took seven months of repair work in the frigid Kazakhstan winter to be restored to use. The reason for the LES firing was thought to be either a timer being activated due to the Earth's rotation affecting the gyroscope package in the launch vehicle or perhaps one of the service towers bumping it.

Within 24 hours of the pad disaster, Vasily Mishin was drafting a new launch schedule. Under the original plan, Soyuz vehicles 3 and 4 would carry out the first manned mission, but Mishin decided that Vehicle No. 3 would carry out an unmanned test after which vehicles 4 and 5 would perform a manned one. Since it would not carry a human crew, the life support systems, crew couch, and Ilga rendezvous system could be removed.

Pad 31 also had to be repaired and in the meantime, it was necessary to speed up planned modifications to Pad 1 to support Soyuz launches, as well as removal of the radio ground guidance system which was only used for ICBM tests. Components could be cannibalized from the R-7 ICBM pads at Plesetsk as the R-7 ICBM program was ending by 1967 and three of the four Plesetsk pads were to be converted for space launches while the fourth pad would be dismantled and was free to use for spare parts.

While this work was going on, the United States space program suffered a disastrous setback with the Apollo 1 fire and deaths of three astronauts on January 27. Mishin's team assured that a similar disaster was impossible with Soyuz as it did not use a pure oxygen atmosphere. They also had to give assurances that modification of the SAS escape system after the December 14 disaster were being completed, and that the escape system from now on could only be activated by manual ground command prior to liftoff.

Vehicle No. 3 was fueled on January 29 and erection of the booster on the pad was done on February 3. The initial launch attempt on February 6 was aborted due to detection of an electrical voltage on the exterior of the spacecraft.

== Launch ==
In February 1967, the backup booster and spacecraft were set up at LC-1 and the planned mission could be carried out. Kosmos 140 was operated in a low Earth orbit, on 7 February 1967, it had a perigee of 165 km (103 mi), an apogee of 218 km (135 mi), an inclination of 51.7°, and an orbital period of 88.5 minutes.It took until eight minutes after liftoff to ascertain that orbit had been attained as the booster was launched on a shallower than usual flight trajectory, meaning ground tracking stations lost sight of it before orbital velocity was attained. The Soviet TASS news agency announced the flight as Kosmos 140 and offered little information about its mission.

Initial flight data showed that Kosmos 140 appeared to be functioning properly for orbits 1-3. A brief firing with the attitude control thrusters was performed during orbit 5 to ensure it would remain aloft for at least 48 orbits. During the fifth orbit, commands were sent to put Kosmos 140 in a spin stabilization mode but the spacecraft did not appear to receive them. Telemetry data also showed overuse of attitude control propellant. It could not be confirmed that the 40K star tracker was working properly.

After much debate and arguments, the decision was made to fire the main propulsion system to put Kosmos 140 into a 310x220 km orbit. The burn, just shy of one minute long, was performed on orbit 22 and would ensure that the craft would not decay for at least a month. Although the solar orientation was faulty, the batteries had sufficient power for one more day of flight. Yuri Gagarin expressed his belief that the attitude control problems could be resolved if a human pilot was aboard.

On February 9, General Kamanin, the head of cosmonaut training, was informed that Kosmos 140 could not be stabilized and was running low on propellant and electrical power. The decision was made to abort the mission and reenter on orbit 33.

== Return ==
The spacecraft suffered attitude control problems and excessive fuel consumption in orbit, but remained controllable. An attempted maneuver on the 22nd orbit still showed problems with the control system.

The retro burn and separation of the three modules was completed properly, but after the radio blackout ended, no signals were received from the UHF transmitter while the shortwave signals were too weak to track. At last a weak signal was picked up, but it indicated that the descent module was coming down over the Aral Sea instead of the planned landing site to the east. Recovery crews finally spotted it sitting on the ice over top the frozen lake.

It malfunctioned yet again during retrofire, leading to a steeper than planned ballistic reentry and a 30 centimetres (12 in) hole being burned in the heat shield.

Before a recovery team could reach the descent module, it had fallen through the ice and sank in approximately 32 feet (10 meters) of water, only the parachute still visible, although it was supposed to float in case of a water landing. The recovery crew were unable to get information about the weight of the descent module or the status of the APO self-destruct charge.

A team of Soviet navy divers was dispatched and an Mi-6 transport helicopter dragged the descent module out; as it was waterlogged, it was nearly at the helicopter's maximum payload capacity. The module was extracted from the lake successfully and examined by engineers. The reason for the sinking was found to be a 30 by 100 millimeter hole in the bottom. This had resulted in depressurization of the descent module during reentry and ultimately allowed water to get inside and cause it to sink.

The depressurization had apparently resulted in a breech in the heat shield, which had a hole in it for insertion of a temperature-measuring sensor that was sealed with a screw plug prior to launch, but the plug had disappeared to parts unknown. The heat shield had broken apart on impact with the frozen lake and most of the pieces could not be located, but one part did have a piece of the screw groove with traces of burn-through.

The investigative team concluded that the reentry of Kosmos 140 would have been fatal to a human crew as they did not wear pressure suits; if they did have them on, they would probably be killed by hot exhaust gases during reentry. The drilled hole for the temperature sensor would be abandoned on subsequent vehicles and reinforcing braces added to the heat shield. Additionally, the sides of the descent module would have improved thermal protection.

Despite all this, it was decided to go ahead with the first manned Soyuz flight, tentatively scheduled for April 12, the anniversary of Gagarin's flight.
