= Soyuz 9 =

Crewed flight of the Soyuz programme

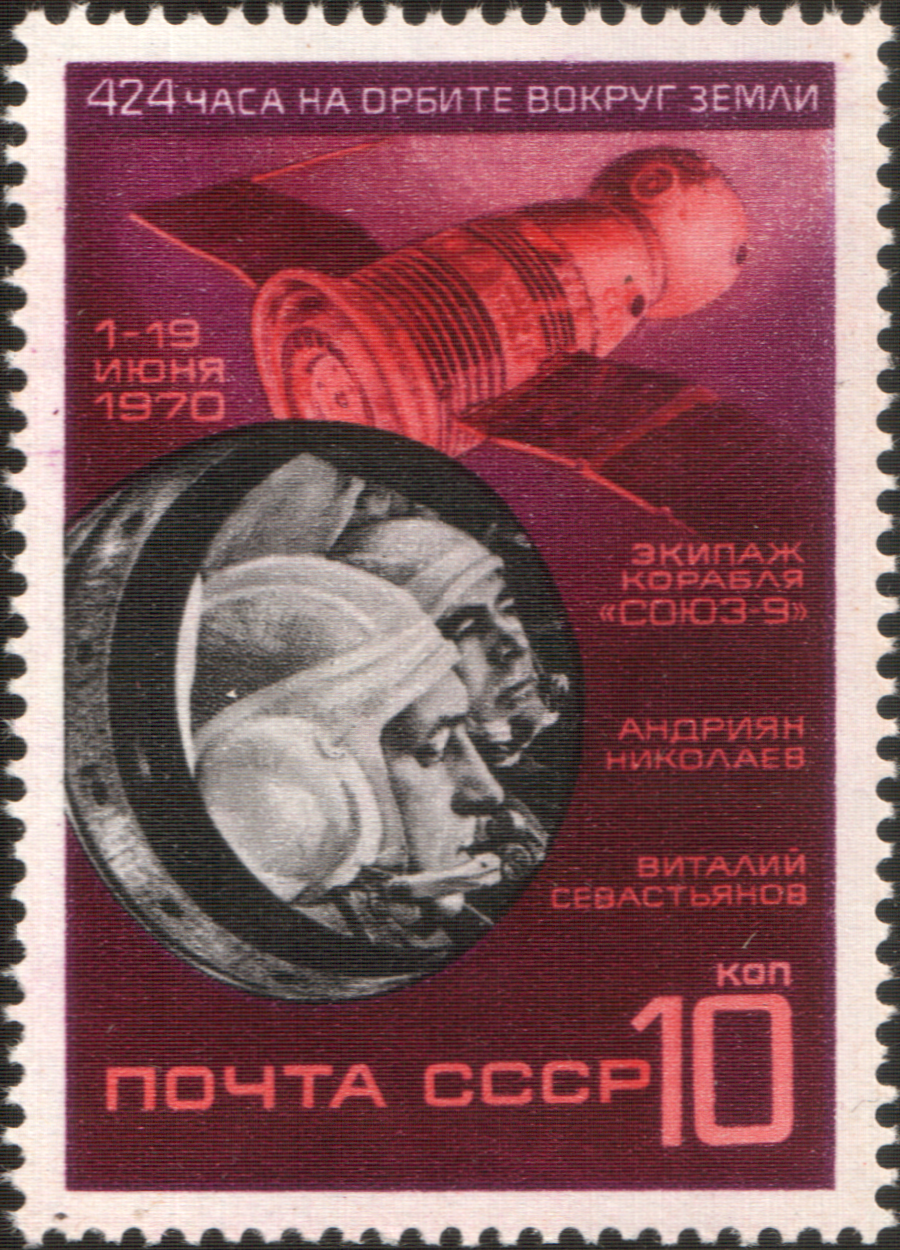
- Andriyan Nikolayev and Vitaly Sevastyanov on the 1971 commemorative stamp "424 Hours On Earth's Orbit" of Soviet Union
- Mission type: Test flight
- Operator: Soviet space program
- COSPAR ID: 1970-041A
- SATCAT no.: 04407
- Mission duration: 17 days, 16 hours, 58 minutes, 55 seconds
- Orbits completed: 288

Spacecraft properties
- Spacecraft: Soyuz 7K-OK No.17
- Spacecraft type: Soyuz 7K-OK
- Manufacturer: Experimental Design Bureau (OKB-1)
- Launch mass: 6460 kg
- Landing mass: 1200 kg

Crew
- Crew size: 2
- Members: Andriyan Nikolayev; Vitaly Sevastyanov
- Callsign: Сокол (Sokol – "Falcon")

Start of mission
- Launch date: 1 June 1970, 19:00:00 GMT
- Rocket: Soyuz
- Launch site: Baikonur, Site 31/6

End of mission
- Landing date: 19 June 1970, 11:58:55 GMT
- Landing site: Steppes in Kazakhstan

Orbital parameters
- Reference system: Geocentric orbit
- Regime: Low Earth orbit
- Perigee altitude: 207.0 km
- Apogee altitude: 220.0 km
- Inclination: 51.70°
- Period: 88.59 minutes
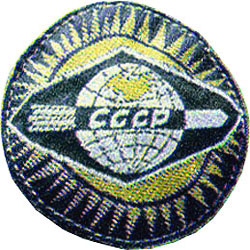
- Vimpel Diamond for entrainment patch Soyuz programme

Soyuz 9 (Russian: Союз 9, Union 9) was a Soviet crewed space flight launched in June 1970. The two-man crew of Andriyan Nikolayev and Vitaly Sevastyanov broke the five-year-old space endurance record held by Gemini 7, with their nearly 18-day flight. The mission enabled the Salyut space station missions, investigating the effects of long-term weightlessness on crew, and evaluating the work that the cosmonauts could do in orbit, individually and as a team. It was also the last flight of the first-generation Soyuz 7K-OK spacecraft, as well as the first crewed space launch to be conducted at night. As of 2026, Soyuz 9 marks the longest crewed flight by a solo spacecraft.

== Crew ==
Position	Cosmonaut
Commander	Andrian Nikolayev; Second and last spaceflight
Flight engineer	Vitaly Sevastyanov; First spaceflight

=== Backup crew ===
Position	Cosmonaut
Commander	Anatoly Filipchenko
Flight engineer	Georgy Grechko

=== Reserve crew ===
Position	Cosmonaut
Commander	Vasily Lazarev
Flight engineer	Valeri Yazdovsky

== Mission ==
The flight was primarily a preparatory run for the planned long duration space station missions. It tested, for a longer period of time than any other, the capacity of the hardware and the human crew, on the long-term exposure to space conditions and observing (both visually and photographically) geological and geographical objects, weather formations, water surfaces, and snow and ice covers. The crew conducted observations of celestial bodies and practiced astronavigation, by locking onto Vega or Canopus, and then used a sextant to measure its relation to the Earth horizon. The orbital elements were refined to three decimal places by the crew.

Soyuz 9 was planned to be the first manned Soviet space mission launched during nighttime hours and it had been hoped to launch it on April 22 to commemorate the centennial of Lenin's birth but the mission took two more months to be ready. LC-1 was off-line for a year from October 1969 to October '70 as the pad was being renovated to be able to support Zenit reconnaissance satellite launches, so all R-7 vehicle launches from Baikonur during this time took place from LC-31. The pad sustained some damage during a Zenit launch on May 20 due to wind blowing around the rocket's exhaust flames and burning through cabling but repairs were quickly completed. Further delays occurred when problems were found with the spacecraft's electrical system. There was also a fault with the propellant feed system on the Blok I stage of the booster--this issue had occurred on several Zenit launches but to date not a Soyuz launch. The booster was rolled out to the pad and erected on 1 June and prelaunch preparations went smoothly. Liftoff took place at 11:00 PM Moscow time and the spacecraft was inserted into a 136x128 mile (219x206 km) orbit. The cosmonauts fired the Soyuz's engine to enter an orbit of 132x167 miles (214x269 km). Once this had been accomplished, the Soviet state media officially announced the mission and described it as a "long duration flight" although the specific duration was not mentioned. Another engine burn the night of 2 June placed Soyuz 9 in a 165x153 mile (266x247 km) orbit at a 51° inclination which was considered stable enough to last for the length of the mission.

Efforts were made to make the accommodations inside Soyuz 9 comfortable for the cosmonauts' lengthy mission. They had sleeping bags inside the orbital module and a heater to prepare food with. They watched broadcasts of the 1970 World Cup on TV. A rudimentary exercise regimen was carried out so as to keep them in shape over the mission although this would prove less effective than hoped.

16 June marked fifteen days in orbit and there were concerns about the spacecraft's orbit decaying too much by 20 June thus an engine burn would have to be conducted on 18 June to raise the orbit, but medical director E. Vorobiev argued that an extra day of flight was not necessary for medical data-gathering purposes and it would be better to land while the Soyuz still had adequate propellant reserves. Ultimately it was decided to go for the original 18 day flight plan if the propellant supply could hold out.

De-orbit and landing took place on 19 June at about 75 kilometers (46 miles) west of Karaganda. The cosmonauts were weaker than anticipated and had to be helped to the evacuation helicopter. Nikolayev momentarily became unconscious during the walk. Both developed a high fever and postflight medical examination found that their hearts had shrunk by as much as 20%. It was a week before they were able to walk unassisted. The lessons learned from Soyuz 9 were utilized in planning for the Salyut program, which was then in the developmental phase.

Commander Nikolayev and flight engineer Sevastyanov spent 18 days in space conducting various physiological and biomedical experiments on themselves, but also investigating the social implications of prolonged spaceflight. The cosmonauts spent time in two-way TV links with their families, watched matches in the 1970 FIFA World Cup, played chess with ground control, and voted in a Soviet election. The mission set a new space endurance record and marked a shift in emphasis away from spacefarers merely being able to exist in space for the duration of a long mission (such as the Apollo flights to the Moon) to being able to live in space. The mission took an unexpected physical toll on the cosmonauts; in order to conserve attitude control gas during the lengthy stay in orbit, Soyuz 9 was placed in a spin-stabilisation mode that made Nikolayev and Sevastyanov dizzy and space sick.

== Mission parameters ==
- Mass: 6,460 kg (14,240 lb)
- Perigee: 207.0 km (128.6 mi)
- Apogee: 220.0 km (136.7 mi)
- Inclination: 51.70°
- Period: 88.59 minutes

== Chess game ==
Nikolayev and Sevastyanov vs. Kamanin and Gorbatko, Space/Earth 1970

Position: white rook, white pawn, black bishop, black pawn, white pawn, black pawn, black rook, white queen, black pawn, white pawn, white bishop, white pawn, white bishop, black bishop, white pawn, white pawn, white knight, black knight, black king, white rook, black pawn, white pawn, black knight, white knight, white king, black pawn, black pawn, black pawn, black queen, black rook, white pawn, black pawn

Final position, following 35... Kg8.

During the mission, the two cosmonauts played a game of chess against a pair of opponents on Earth: head of cosmonauts Nikolai Kamanin and fellow cosmonaut Viktor Gorbatko. It was the first documented game played by humans while in space. (Note: Although the Soyuz 9 game is the first documented chess game played in space, some sources have indicated that this was not the first time a chess set was flown in space. During Expo 2020 in Dubai, a chess set was exhibited which was said to have been flown aboard Soyuz 3 and Soyuz 4. (Dubai hosted the 2021 World Chess Championship concurrently with Expo 2020). However, it is unclear whether the set was used on either mission. Soyuz 3 had a single crew member, and was a failed docking attempt with the uncrewed Soyuz 2. Soyuz 4 also launched with a single crew member aboard, but quickly returned to Earth with another two cosmonauts. The latter had launched aboard Soyuz 5 and carried out the first-ever crew transfer via EVA, boarding Soyuz 4 for return to Earth.) It was a consultation game, with the two cosmonauts playing as White and jointly deciding each move, while the two players on Earth did likewise as Black. The set used aboard Soyuz 9 had pegs and grooves to keep the pieces in place and did not include magnets, which might have interfered with the spacecraft's systems.

The game began as a Queen's Gambit Accepted, with both players castling kingside. Material was exchanged evenly throughout the game. Toward the end of the game White checked Black four times, and rapid exchange of remaining pieces ensued. At 35. Qxf6+, Black responded with the final move 35... Kg8 (the only legal move), moving the king to the flight square g8. In the final position each side had a queen and five pawns, with no passed pawns. The game concluded as a draw.

White: A. Nikolayev and V. Sevastyanov (Low Earth orbit) Black: N. Kamanin and V. Gorbatko (Earth)
Queen's Gambit Accepted (QGA) (ECO D20), 9/10 June 1970
1.d4 d5 2.c4 dxc4 3.e3 e5 4.Bxc4 exd4 5.exd4 Nc6 6.Be3 Bd6 7.Nc3 Nf6 8.Nf3 0-0 9.0-0 Bg4 10.h3 Bf5 11.Nh4 Qd7 12.Qf3 Ne7 13.g4 Bg6 14.Rae1 Kh8 15.Bg5 Neg8 16.Ng2 Rae8 17.Be3 Bb4 18.a3 Bxc3 19.bxc3 Be4 20.Qg3 c6 21.f3 Bd5 22.Bd3 b5 23.Qh4 g6 24.Nf4 Bc4 25.Bxc4 bxc4 26.Bd2 Rxe1 27.Rxe1 Nd5 28.g5 Qd6 29.Nxd5 cxd5 30.Bf4 Qd8 31.Be5+ f6 32.gxf6 Nxf6 33.Bxf6+ Rxf6 34.Re8+ Qxe8 35.Qxf6+ Kg8 ½–½

Sevastyanov was a chess enthusiast and after retiring from the cosmonaut corps served as president of the Soviet Chess Federation from 1977-86 and 1988-89.

== Return ==
The spacecraft soft-landed in the steppes of Kazakhstan, and the crew was picked up immediately. Adjusting to gravity of Earth seemed to present a minor problem for the two cosmonauts. They required help exiting the descent module and were virtually unable to walk for a few days. Nonetheless, this experience proved the importance of providing crews with exercise equipment during missions. After landing the crew spent 2 weeks in a quarantine unit originally designed for cosmonauts returning from Moon landings. At the time the Soviet press reported that this was done to protect the cosmonauts in case space travel had weakened their immune systems. However, the quarantine process was likely practice for the Soviet crewed lunar program, which at that point had not been abandoned.

== See also ==
- Timeline of longest spaceflights
