= Kosmos 186 and Kosmos 188 =

Uncrewed docking test of the Soyuz 7K-OK spacecraft

Kosmos 186
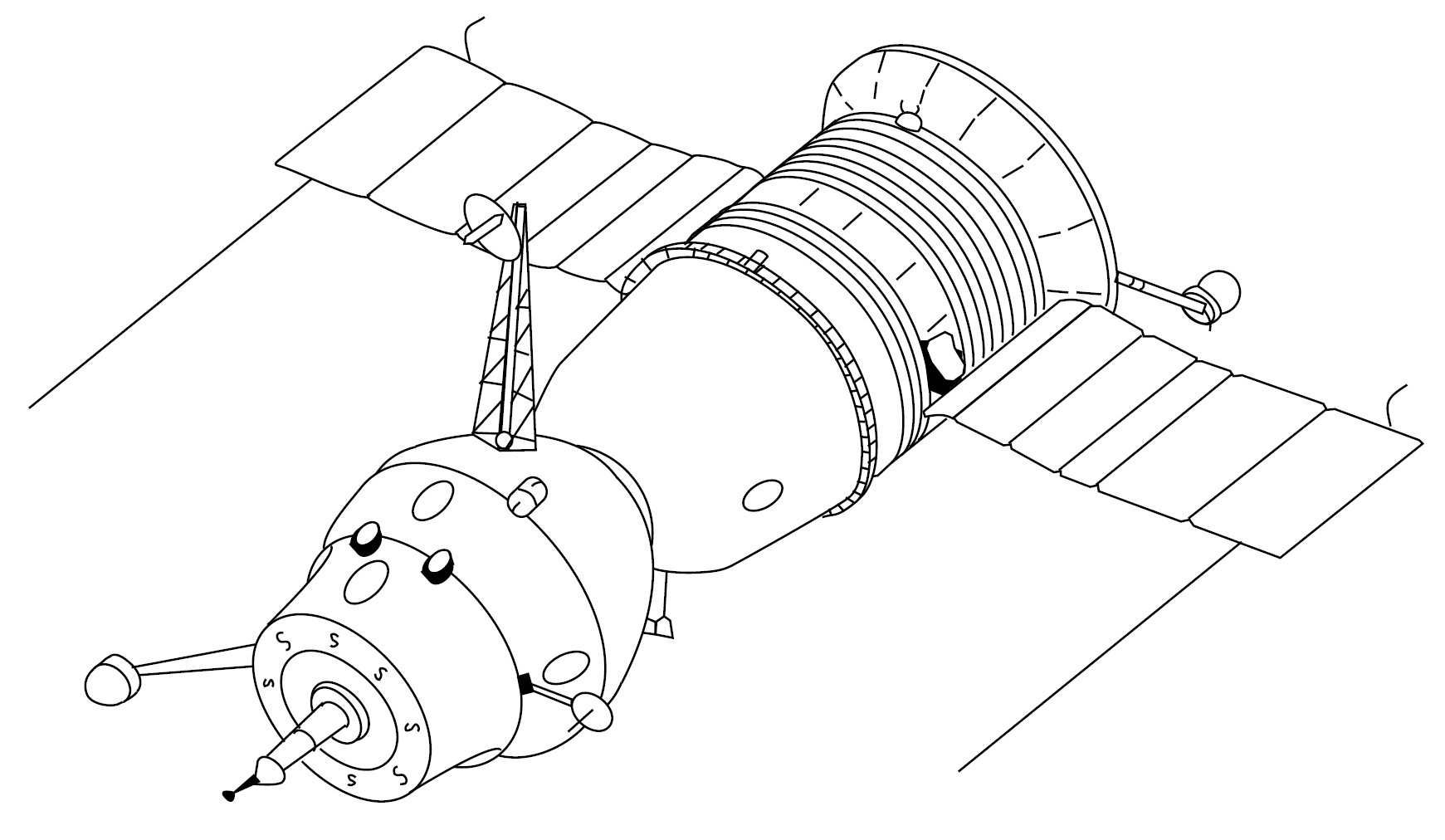
- A Soyuz 7K-OK spacecraft with an active docking unit
- Mission type: Uncrewed spacecraft
- Operator: OKB-1
- COSPAR ID: 1967-105A
- SATCAT no.: 3014
- Mission duration: 4 days

Spacecraft properties
- Spacecraft: Soyuz
- Spacecraft type: Soyuz 7K-OK # 6
- Manufacturer: OKB-1
- Launch mass: 6000 kg

Start of mission
- Launch date: 27 October 1967, 09:29:59 GMT
- Rocket: Soyuz 11A511
- Launch site: Baikonur 31/6
- Contractor: OKB-1

End of mission
- Landing date: 31 October 1967

Orbital parameters
- Reference system: Geocentric
- Regime: Low Earth
- Perigee altitude: 172 km
- Apogee altitude: 212 km
- Inclination: 51.7°
- Period: 88.7 minutes
- Epoch: 27 October 1967

Kosmos 188
- Mission type: Uncrewed spacecraft
- Operator: OKB-1
- COSPAR ID: 1967-107A
- SATCAT no.: 3020
- Mission duration: 3 days

Spacecraft properties
- Spacecraft: Soyuz
- Spacecraft type: Soyuz 7K-OK # 5
- Manufacturer: OKB-1
- Launch mass: 6000 kg

Start of mission
- Launch date: 30 October 1967, 08:12:41 GMT
- Rocket: Soyuz 11A511
- Launch site: Baikonur 1/5
- Contractor: OKB-1

End of mission
- Landing date: 2 November 1967

Orbital parameters
- Reference system: Geocentric
- Regime: Low Earth
- Perigee altitude: 180 km
- Apogee altitude: 247 km
- Inclination: 51.7°
- Period: 89.0 minutes
- Epoch: 30 October 1967
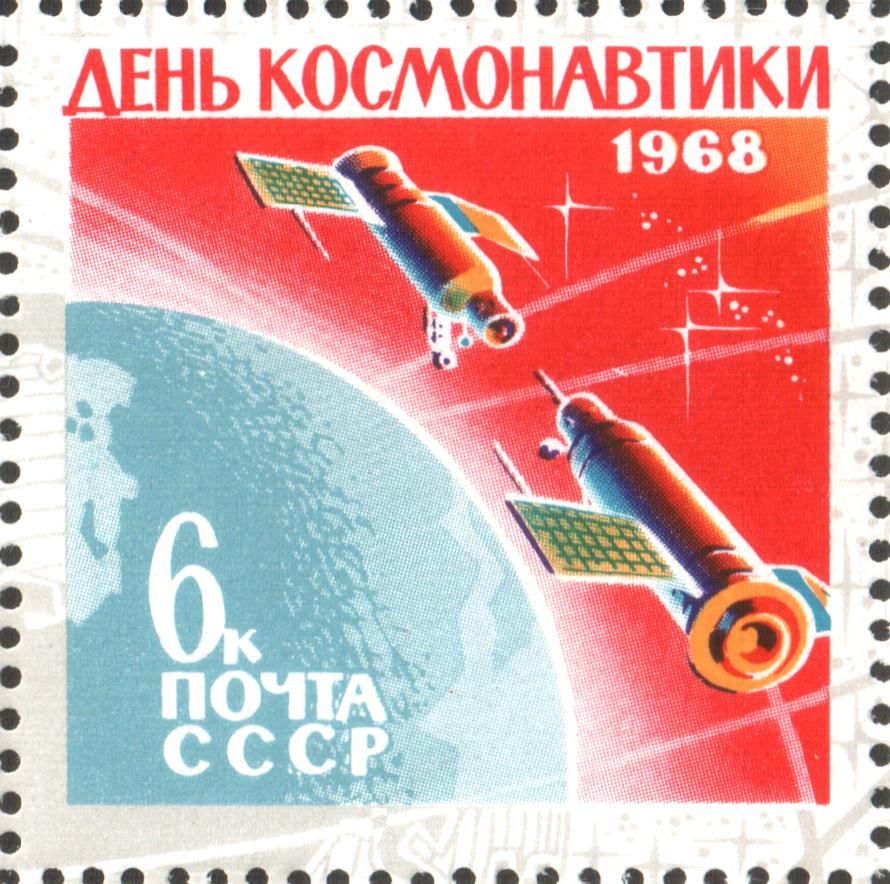
- Kosmos 186/188 stamp (1968) Soyuz (spacecraft) Kosmos (satellites)

Kosmos 186 (Russian: Космос-186 meaning Cosmos 186) and Kosmos 188 (Russian: Космос-188 meaning Cosmos 188) were two uncrewed Soviet Union spacecraft that incorporated a Soyuz programme descent module for landing scientific instruments and test objects.

== Mission ==
Because of the lethal outcome of both the Soyuz 1 and the Apollo 1 missions earlier that year it was decided to proceed with unmanned flights first. But because the Soviet Union had no ground stations outside its own territory, this meant the docking had to be fully automated. After the first attempt failed (a fly by at a distance of 900 metres (3,000 ft)), the second attempt succeeded over the South Atlantic. However, this docking was not entirely successful either — the modules were mechanically docked, but not electrically. Also, the manoeuvre had cost more fuel than anticipated.

On 27 October 1967 at 09:29:59 GMT, the Soyuz 11A511 s/n U15000-05 booster and Kosmos 186 were set up at Site 31/6 of Baikonur Cosmodrome and the planned mission could be carried out. Kosmos 186 was operated in a low Earth orbit, it had a perigee of 172 kilometres (107 mi), an apogee of 212 kilometres (132 mi), an inclination of 51.7°, and an orbital period of 88.7 minutes, and had a mass of 6,000 kilograms (13,000 lb).

On 30 October 1967 at 08:12:41 GMT, the Soyuz 11A511 s/n N15000-07 booster and Kosmos 188 were set up at Site 1/5 of Baikonur Cosmodrome and the planned mission could be carried out. Kosmos 188 was operated in a low Earth orbit, it had a perigee of 180 kilometres (110 mi), an apogee of 247 kilometres (153 mi), an inclination of 51.7°, and an orbital period of 89.0 minutes, and had a mass of 6,000 kilograms (13,000 lb).

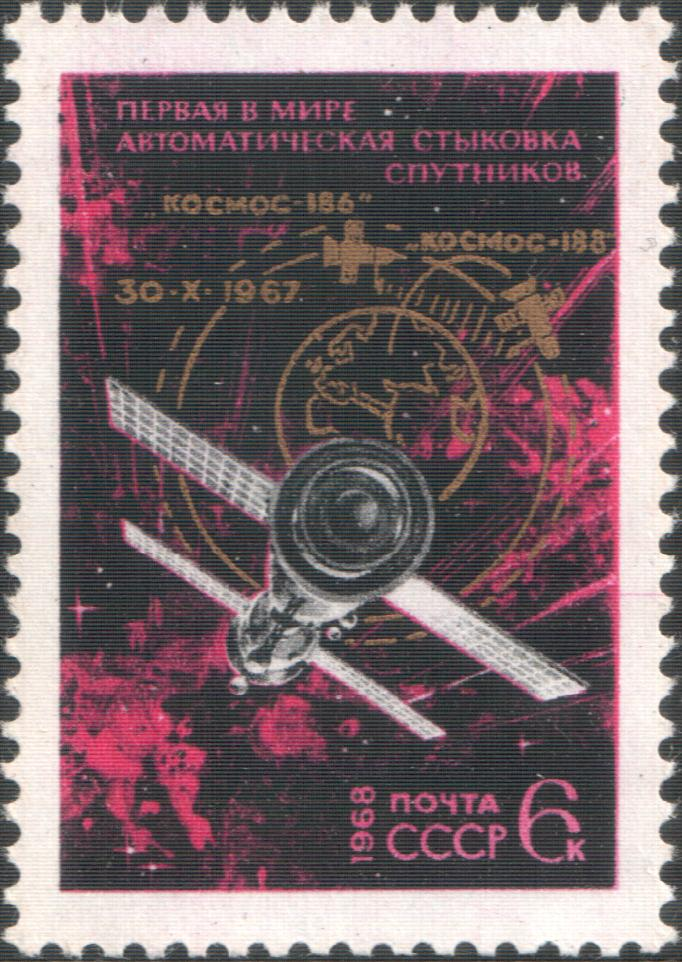
The first automatic docking in space. Soviet Union stamp, 1968.

The two Soviet spacecraft made the first fully automated space docking in the history of space exploration on 30 October 1967. Mutual search, approach, mooring, and docking were automatically performed by the IGLA-system onboard Kosmos 186. After 3.5 hours of joint flight, the satellites parted on a command sent from the Earth and continued to orbit separately. Officially, both made a soft landing in a predetermined region of the Soviet Union — Kosmos 186 on 31 October 1967 and Kosmos 188 on 2 November 1967. But according to Boris Chertok, "one of the vehicles was destroyed by the emergency destruction system". (See B.Chertok, Rockets and People, Vol.IV, Chapter 8, page 156)

Kosmos 186 (Soyuz 7K-OK No.6) launched first on 27 October 1967 and underwent a meticulous on-orbit checkout, followed by Kosmos 188 three days later. With Kosmos 186 taking the active role in the docking, the two craft docked just 62 minutes after the launch of Kosmos 188 (Soyuz 7K-OK No.5), the passive target spacecraft. The two craft remained mechanically docked for three and a half hours, although an electrical connection could not be made. The descent module of Kosmos 186 was successfully recovered in the Soviet Union on 31 October 1967, but the accidental firing of the self-destruct mechanism of Kosmos 188 during the descent prevented its recovery on 2 November 1967. Despite the anomalies, the automatic docking mission demonstrated a new capability for the Soviet Union that proved valuable to their future human space flight programs. Although the Soviet lunar landing programme was cancelled before an actual landing mission, automatic dockings were an integral component of their Salyut and Mir space station programs and remain in practice today on the Russian segment of the International Space Station.

This mission proved it possible to launch smaller parts and assemble them in space, thus eliminating the need for exceedingly large rockets for larger undertakings like a space station.

== See also ==
- SPADEX
- ETS-VII
- Orbital Express
