= Igla (spacecraft docking system) =

Soviet spacecraft docking system

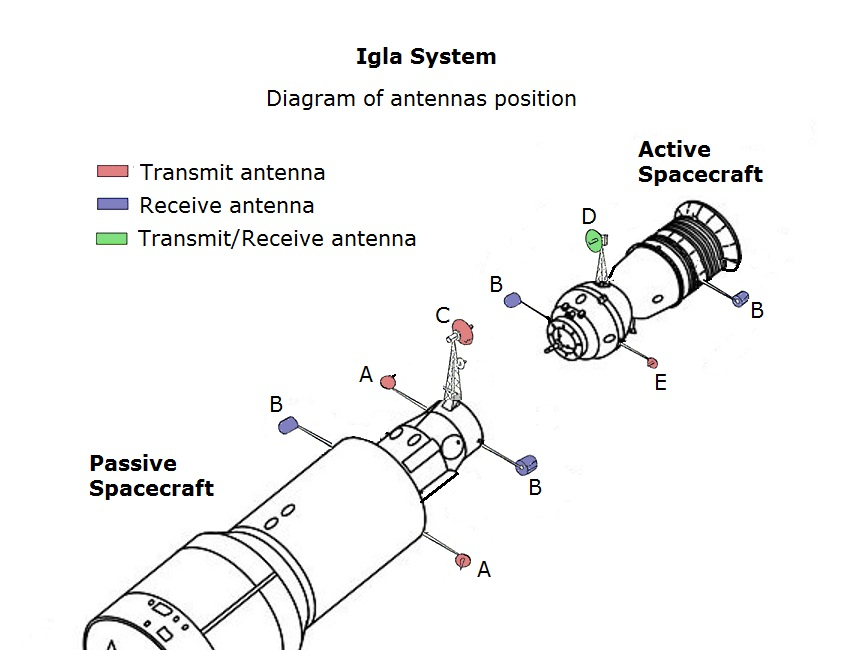
Drawing of Soyuz with the Igla docking navigation system

The Igla (Russian: Игла, "Needle") docking system was a Soviet radio telemetry system for automated docking of Soyuz spacecraft. The first prototypes were made in late 1965. On 30 October 1967, the first automated docking of Soyuz uncrewed spacecraft took place.

== Problems ==
- The Soyuz 15 mission was aborted when the system failed to dock to the Salyut 3, on 26 August 1974. There was no manual backup system.
- Salyut 5, launched on June 22, 1976, was equipped with an improved radio system. On July 6, 1976, Soyuz 21 had problems undocking automatically, but was able to undock manually. Soyuz 23 failed to dock, ran out of fuel to manual dock, and returned to Earth.
- The Igla docking system suffered an engine failure on Soyuz 33 on 10 April, 1979. After consideration by ground crews, the mission was aborted by firing the backup engines and initiating a ballistic reentry.

== Kurs ==
In 1986 Igla was succeeded by the Kurs docking system, first used on Soyuz TM-1.
