= Soyuz TM-1 =

1986 Soviet uncrewed spaceflight to Mir

- COSPAR ID: 1986-035A
- SATCAT no.: 16722
- Mission duration: 9 days

Spacecraft properties
- Spacecraft type: Soyuz-TM
- Manufacturer: NPO Energia
- Launch mass: 6,450 kilograms (14,220 lb)

Start of mission
- Launch date: 21 May 1986 UTC
- Rocket: Soyuz-U2
- Launch site: Baikonur 1/5

End of mission
- Landing date: 30 May 1986 UTC

Orbital parameters
- Reference system: Geocentric
- Regime: Low Earth

Docking with Mir
- Docking date: 23 May 1986
- Undocking date: 29 May 1986

Soyuz TM-1 was an unmanned test flight of the Soyuz-TM spacecraft, intended for use in the Mir space station program. This was the maiden flight of the Soyuz-TM spacecraft, intended as the successor to the Soyuz-T spacecraft used in the Salyut program. It docked to Mir on 23 May 1986, and undocked on the 29th. It was the last uncrewed Soyuz flight until Soyuz MS-14, in 2019.

== Mission parameters ==
- Spacecraft: Soyuz-7K-STM
- Mass: 6450 kg
- Crew: None
- Launched: May 21, 1986
- Landed: May 30, 1986
