= Soyuz MS-14 =

2019 Russian uncrewed spaceflight to the ISS

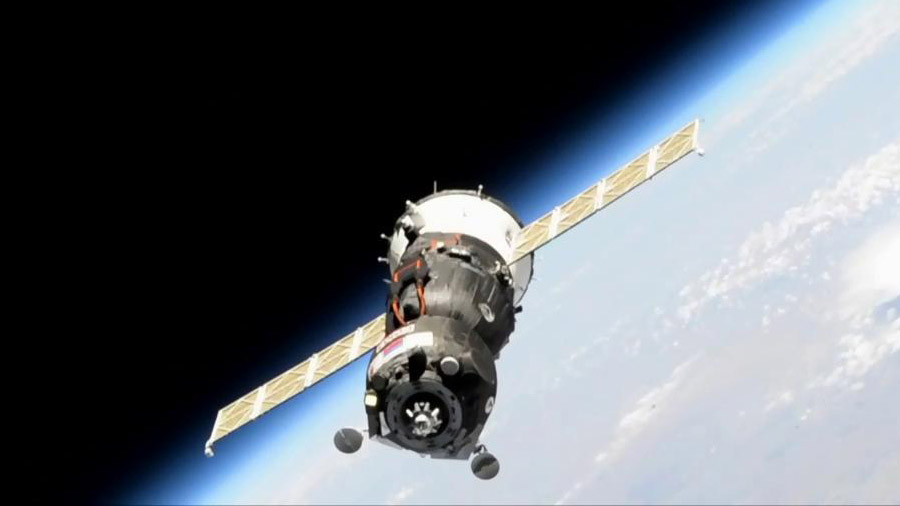
- The Soyuz MS-14 approaches the ISS (first attempt)
- Mission type: Flight test
- Operator: Roscosmos
- COSPAR ID: 2019-055A
- SATCAT no.: 44504
- Mission duration: 15 days, 17 hours, 45 minutes

Spacecraft properties
- Spacecraft: Soyuz MS-14 No. 744
- Spacecraft type: Soyuz MS (11F747)
- Manufacturer: Energia

Start of mission
- Launch date: 22 August 2019, 03:38 UTC
- Rocket: Soyuz-2.1a
- Launch site: Baikonur, Site 31/6
- Contractor: RKTs Progress

End of mission
- Landing date: 6 September 2019, 21:32 UTC
- Landing site: 147 km (91 mi) southeast of Jezkazgan

Orbital parameters
- Reference system: Geocentric
- Regime: Low Earth
- Inclination: 51.6°

Docking with ISS (first attempt)
- Docking port: Poisk zenith
- Docking date: Aborted: 24 August 2019, 05:36 UTC

Docking with ISS (second attempt)
- Docking port: Zvezda aft
- Docking date: 27 August 2019, 03:08 UTC
- Undocking date: 6 September 2019, 18:14 UTC
- Time docked: 10 days, 15 hours, 6 minutes

Cargo
- Mass: 660 kg (1,460 lb)

Soyuz MS-14 was a Soyuz spaceflight to the International Space Station. It carried no crew members, as it was intended to test a modification of the launch abort system for integration with the Soyuz-2.1a launch vehicle. It launched successfully on 22 August 2019 at 03:38 UTC. It was the first mission of the Soyuz crew vehicle without a crew in 33 years, and the first-ever unpiloted mission of Soyuz to the ISS.

== Overview ==
Unlike the traditional Soyuz-FG launcher, which is turned on its launchpad to set azimuth of its flight, Soyuz-2 performs a roll maneuver during its flight to change direction. The maneuver would trigger the analog launch abort system designed for Soyuz-FG. Soyuz MS-14 tested a solution for this issue. The 14th flight of Soyuz MS is the 143rd flight of a Soyuz spacecraft. If all goes well, future crewed missions will use the new configuration starting with Soyuz MS-16 in early 2020.

Besides testing the integration of the new launcher and the abort system Soyuz MS-14 is also testing an upgraded navigation and propulsion control system. The results of the testing will be used in the design of Soyuz GVK, an uncrewed cargo delivery and return spacecraft, tentatively scheduled to be launched for the first time in 2022.

Unlike preceding and future Soyuz MS spacecraft, Soyuz MS-14 lacks various crew support systems.

The spacecraft carried cargo to the International Space Station, among other things a humanoid robot Fedor that travelled in the crew compartment of the Soyuz (which was available to use as the mission had no crew). The Fedor robot returned to Earth on 6 September 2019 in the landing crew capsule of Soyuz MS-14 (which was again uncrewed). According to NASA, 1,450 pounds (660 kg) of cargo were delivered to ISS.

The spacecraft delivered the Mini-EUSO telescope to the ISS.

=== Aftermath ===
In August 2021, the descent module was handed over to Magnitogorsk Iron and Steel Works for placement in a museum.

== Docking ==
=== First attempt ===
Following a flawless two-day-long free flight and rendezvous with the ISS, MS-14 was scheduled to dock with the station's Poisk module at 05:30 UTC on 24 August 2019. During the final phases of the spacecraft's approach to the ISS, its Kurs rendezvous system failed to lock onto the station, and the spacecraft was not able to dock. Expedition 60 commander Aleksey Ovchinin commanded MS-14 to abort its docking, after which the spacecraft backed away to a safe distance from the ISS. Whereas most unmanned Russian spacecraft flying to ISS also feature a TORU backup system enabling cosmonauts to take manual control of the spacecraft from the ISS, this system was not fitted to MS-14. The fault was located on the Kurs signal amplifier on ISS's Poisk docking module, and initial plans called for the cosmonauts to replace this amplifier ahead of a new docking attempt. It was subsequently decided that, on 26 August, the crew of Soyuz MS-13 would relocate their spacecraft from the aft port on the Zvezda module to perform a manual docking at the faulty Poisk port, freeing up a port for MS-14 to dock using Kurs on 27 August 2019.

=== Second attempt ===
After trailing the ISS for several days at a distance of over 160 miles, Soyuz MS-14 successfully docked autonomously to the Zvezda aft port on 27 August 2019 at 03:08 UTC.
