= Kosmos 133 =

Uncrewed flight of the Soyuz programme

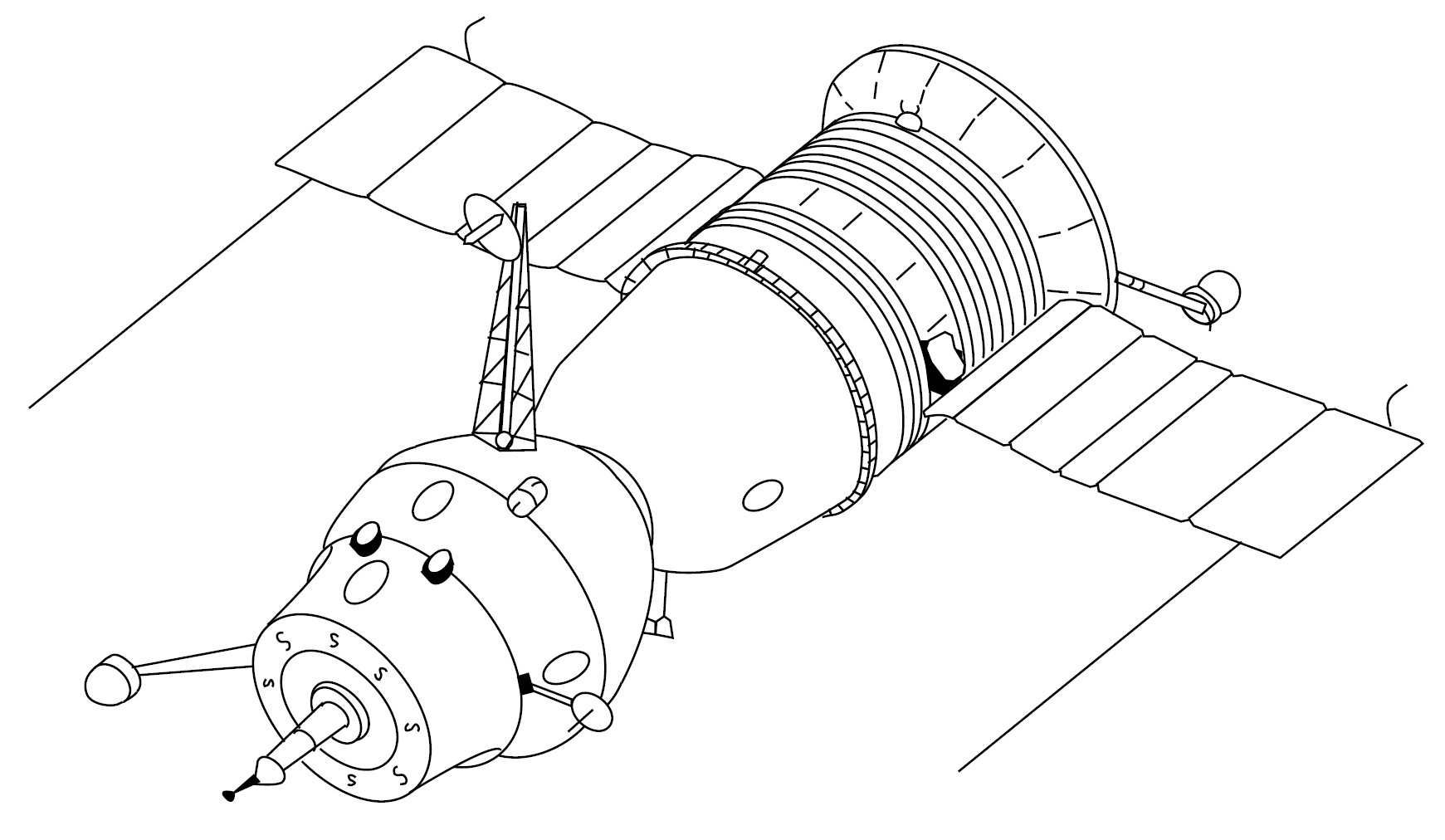
- Soyuz 7K-OK spacecraft with an active docking unit.
- Mission type: Test Flight
- Operator: Experimental Design Bureau (OKB-1)
- COSPAR ID: 1966-107A
- SATCAT no.: 02601
- Mission duration: 1 day, 23 hours and 19 minutes

Spacecraft properties
- Spacecraft: Soyuz 7K-OK No.2
- Spacecraft type: Soyuz 7K-OK
- Manufacturer: Experimental Design Bureau (OKB-1)
- Launch mass: 6450 kg
- Landing mass: 2500 kg
- Dimensions: 7.13 m long 2.72 m wide

Start of mission
- Launch date: 28 November 1966; 11:02:00 GMT
- Rocket: Soyuz 11A511 s/n U15000-02
- Launch site: Baikonour, Site 31/6
- Contractor: Experimental Design Bureau (OKB-1)

End of mission
- Disposal: Exploded: on the self-destruct command of ground
- Landing date: 30 November 1966, 10:21 GMT (exploded)
- Landing site: Kazakh Steppe of Kazakhstan (planned)

Orbital parameters
- Reference system: Geocentric orbit
- Regime: Low Earth orbit
- Perigee altitude: 171.0 km
- Apogee altitude: 223.0 km
- Inclination: 51.9°
- Period: 88.4 minutes

Kosmos 133 (Russian: Космос 133, meaning "Kosmos 133"), Soyuz 7K-OK No.2, was the first uncrewed test flight of the Soyuz spacecraft, and first mission of the Soyuz programme, as part of the Soviet space programme.

== Launch ==
Launched from the Baikonur Cosmodrome aboard the maiden flight of the Soyuz 11A511 s/n U15000-02 launch vehicle. Kosmos 133 was planned "all up" test, to include an automated docking with a second Soyuz spacecraft (Soyuz 7K-OK No.1), which was scheduled for launch the day after Kosmos 133.

== Mission ==
Kosmos 133 was operated in a low Earth orbit, on 28 November 1966, it had a perigee of 171.0 km (106.3 mi), an apogee of 223.0 km (138.6 mi), an inclination of 51.9°, and an orbital period of 88.4 minutes.

== Return ==
Problems found during ground testing of the second spacecraft resulted in its launch being delayed, and it was destroyed when its launch vehicle exploded on its launch pad following a scrubbed launch attempt in December 1966. Before this, the attitude control system (ACS) of Kosmos 133 malfunctioned, resulting in rapid consumption of orientation fuel, leaving it spinning at 2 rpm. After large efforts by ground control and 5 attempts at retrofire over two days, the craft was finally coming down for a landing. Due to the inaccuracy of the reentry burn, it was determined that the capsule would land in China. The self-destruct command was given and the satellite exploded on the 30th of November 1966 at 10:21 GMT.

The fireball passed over west Japan and was recorded by photos and a sketch. Kōichirō Tomita identified that it was the Kosmos 133 spacecraft (30 November 1966).
