= Soyuz 7K-OK No.1 =

Uncrewed flight of the Soyuz programme

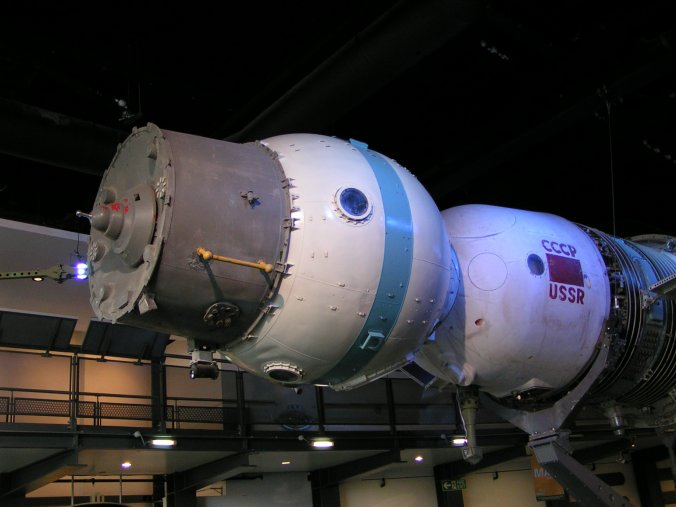
- Soyuz 7K-OK Spacecraft at the National Space Centre
- Mission type: Test Flight
- Operator: Experimental Design Bureau (OKB-1)
- Orbits completed: Failed to orbit

Spacecraft properties
- Spacecraft: Soyuz 7K-OK No.1
- Spacecraft type: Soyuz 7K-OK
- Manufacturer: Experimental Design Bureau (OKB-1)
- Launch mass: 6316 kg
- Landing mass: 2505 kg
- Dimensions: 7.13 m long 2.72 m wide

Start of mission
- Launch date: 14 December 1966; 11:00 GMT
- Rocket: Soyuz 11A511 s/n U15000-01
- Launch site: Baikonur, Site 31
- Contractor: Experimental Design Bureau (OKB-1)

End of mission
- Landing date: 14 December 1966; 18 December 1966 (planned)
- Landing site: 400 m of the pad 31; Kazakh Steppe, Kazakhstan (planned)

Soyuz 7K-OK No.1 was an uncrewed spacecraft of the Soyuz programme, originally intended to perform a rendezvous manoeuvre with Kosmos 133 (Soyuz 7K-OK No.2). After the Kosmos 133 mission failed, the rocket was moved to the launch pad on 12 December 1966 and scheduled to launch on 14 December 1966, 11:00 UTC. The launch was aborted when one of the boosters failed to ignite. As ground crews worked on the now grounded rocket, the launch escape system unexpectedly activated, ejecting the descent module. The exhaust of the escaping capsule started a fire, leading to explosions that destroyed the rocket, severely damaged the launch pad, and directly killing one person. Two more would be killed while cleaning up the aftermath of the disaster.

== Launch ==
At ignition, one of the strap-on boosters failed to start and so an automatic command shut down the core stage and remaining strap-ons. Launch personnel began safing the booster in preparation to take it down from the pad for examination. About 27 minutes after the aborted launch, the launch escape system (LES) suddenly activated. The Soyuz descent module was blasted free of the stack and touched down at 400 m (1,300 ft) from the pad 31. Meanwhile, the exhaust from the LES caught the third stage of the booster on fire. Flames began curling down the side of the booster as launch personnel ran for cover. After a few minutes, the core stage and strap-ons exploded, completely destroying the entire launch vehicle and causing major damage to LC-31. One person on the ground was killed and the pad was not used again for seven months following the disaster.

== Investigation ==
Since tracking cameras around LC-31 had been turned off when the launch aborted, there was no film footage of the fire or explosion for analysis, but telemetry data found that the igniter in the Blok D strap-on had failed to activate. This was a minor problem and could have been easily fixed by simply installing a new igniter. The bigger question was why the LES activated. Initially, it was suspected that the booster had been bumped when the gantry tower was put back in place following the abort and that this somehow managed to trigger the LES, but a more thorough investigation found a different cause. During the attempted launch, the booster switched from external to internal power as it normally would do, which then activated the abort sensing system. The Earth's rotation caused the rate gyros to register an approximately 8° tilt 27 minutes after the aborted liftoff, which the abort sensing system then interpreted as meaning that the booster had deviated from its flight path, and thus it activated the LES. The abort sensing system in the Soyuz was thus redesigned to prevent a recurrence of this unanticipated design flaw. On the other hand, the LES had also worked flawlessly and demonstrated its ability to safely pull cosmonauts from the booster should an emergency arise as it did years later in the Soyuz 7K-ST No.16L abort (26 September 1983).

One more mystery remained, which was why the LES had ignited the third stage on fire, something it was not supposed to do. The conclusion was that when the Soyuz descent module separated from the service module during the abort, it had inadvertently severed coolant lines in the service module, which then leaked out their highly flammable contents and started a fire when they were contacted by the LES exhaust.
