= Soyuz (rocket) =

First version of the Soyuz launch vehicle

Soyuz (11A511)
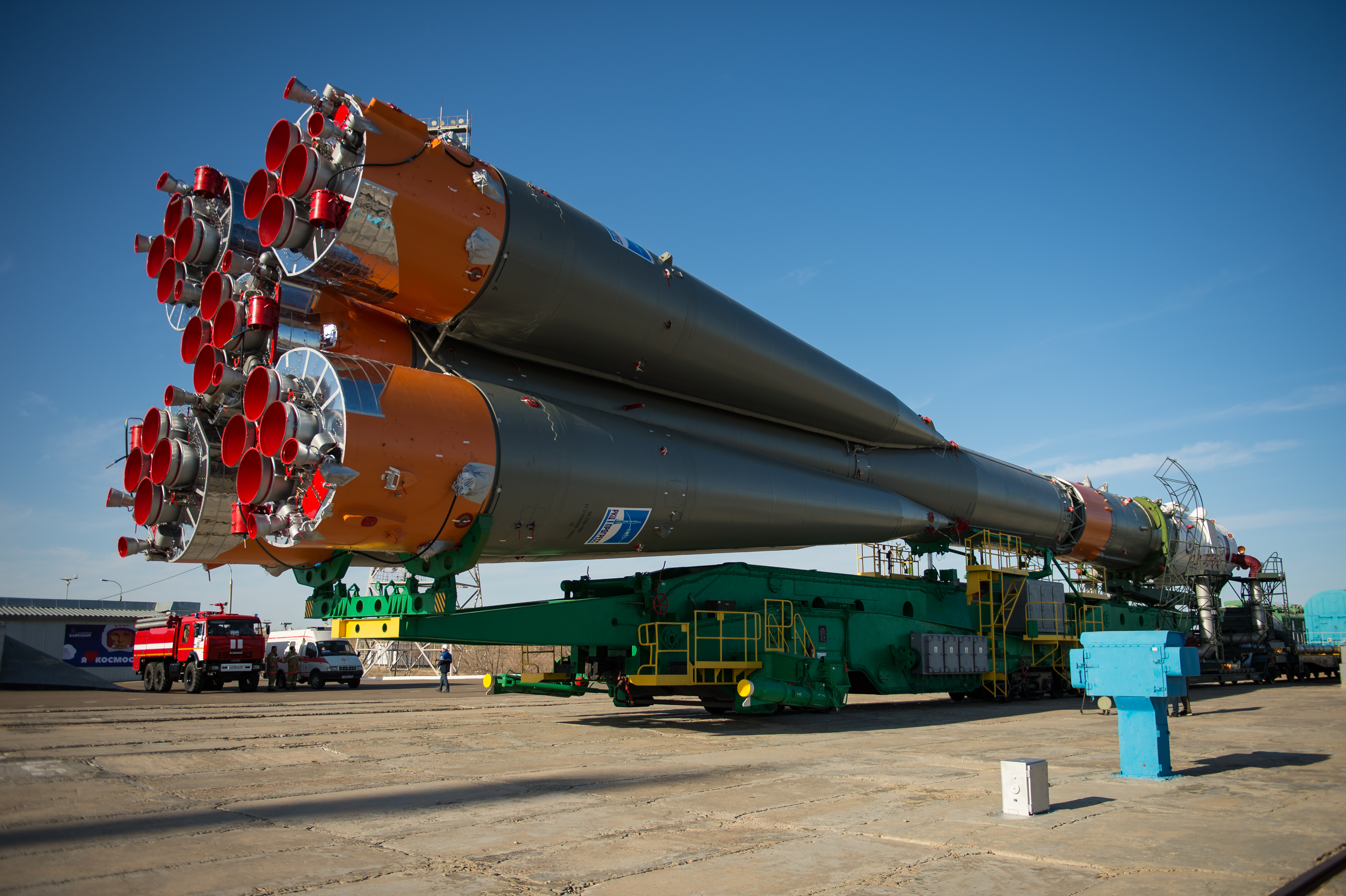
- A later variant of the Soyuz rocket being rolled out to the launch pad at the Baikonur Cosmodrome in Kazakhstan.
- Function: Medium-lift launch vehicle
- Manufacturer: OKB-1
- Country of origin: Soviet Union

Size
- Height: 50.7 m (166 ft 4 in)
- Diameter: 10.3 m (33 ft 10 in)
- Mass: 308,000 kg (679,000 lb)
- Stages: 3

Capacity

Payload to LEO
- Mass: 6,450 kg (14,220 lb)

Associated rockets
- Family: R-7 (Soyuz)
- Derivative work: Soyuz-L; Soyuz-M; Soyuz-U

Launch history
- Status: Retired
- Launch sites: Baikonur, Sites 1/5 & 31/6
- Total launches: 32
- Success(es): 30
- Failure(s): 2 (Soyuz 7K-OK No.1 & Soyuz 18a)
- First flight: 28 November 1966 (Kosmos 133)
- Last flight: 14 October 1976 (Soyuz 23)
- Carries passengers or cargo: Soyuz

Boosters (First stage) – Block B, V, G & D (Note: This is a transliteration of the second through fifth letters of the Cyrillic alphabet (Б, В, Г, Д). A sense-for-sense translation would correspond to the second through fifth letters of the Latin alphabet, 'Block B, C, D & E'.)
- No. boosters: 4
- Powered by: 1 × RD-107MM
- Maximum thrust: SL: 755.14 kN (169,760 lb_{f}); vac: 921.86 kN (207,240 lb_{f})
- Specific impulse: SL: 257 s (2.52 km/s); vac: 314 s (3.08 km/s)
- Burn time: 118 seconds
- Propellant: LOX / RG-1

Second stage (core) – Block A
- Powered by: 1 × RD-108MM
- Maximum thrust: SL: 676.68 kN (152,120 lb_{f}); vac: 833.60 kN (187,400 lb_{f})
- Specific impulse: SL: 253 s (2.48 km/s); vac: 316 s (3.10 km/s)
- Burn time: 292 seconds
- Propellant: LOX / RG-1

Third stage – Block I (Note: This is a transliteration of the tenth letter of the Cyrillic alphabet (И), which also carries the numerical value 10 in Cyrillic numerals. A sense-for-sense translation would use a Roman numeral, 'Block X'.)
- Powered by: 1 × RD-0110
- Maximum thrust: 294 kN (66,000 lb_{f})
- Specific impulse: 330 s (3.2 km/s)
- Burn time: 246 seconds
- Propellant: LOX / RG-1

The Soyuz (Russian: Союз, meaning "union", GRAU index 11A511, Sheldon: A-2, DoD: SL-4) was a Soviet expendable carrier rocket designed in the 1960s by OKB-1 and manufactured by State Aviation Plant No. 1 in Kuybyshev, Soviet Union. It was commissioned to launch Soyuz spacecraft as part of the Soviet human spaceflight program, first with eight uncrewed test flights, followed by the first 19 crewed launches. The original Soyuz also propelled four test flights of the improved Soyuz 7K-T capsule between 1972 and 1974. It flew 30 successful missions over ten years and suffered two failures.

The Soyuz 11A511 type, a member of the R-7 family of rockets, first flew in 1966 and was an attempt to standardize the R-7 family and get rid of the variety of models that existed up to that point. It was basically a Molniya 8K78M without the Blok L stage. It featured the 8D74M RD-107 and the RD-110 engines from the 8K78M, The new, uprated core stage and strap-ons became standard for all R-7 derived launch vehicles to replace the numerous older variants in use. The RD-0110 engine had been introduced on the 8K78M booster in 1964 and was also used in 11A511s due to its enhanced performance, while Voskhod boosters continued using the less powerful RD-0107.

The AVD malfunction detection system, variants of which are a standard component of all Soviet/Russian SLVs, would issue an automatic shutdown command to the booster if operating parameters such as electrical power, engine performance, or flight trajectory deviated from normal, and on manned launches also activate the Launch Escape System. This would prevent a malfunctioning launch vehicle from flying around erratically and ensure it fell to the ground and impacted in a predictable location. The AVD on the 11A511 was blocked from operating until T+8 seconds to ensure the booster's systems had stabilized and entered mainstage operation, but the actual shutdown command was not transmitted until T+20 seconds to prevent the booster from falling back on the pad. Nonetheless, several launches failed over the years due to problems with the AVD itself, which issued erroneous shutdown commands.

Starting in 1973, the original Soyuz rocket was gradually superseded by the Soyuz-U type. It became the world's most prolific launcher, flying hundreds of missions over 43 years until its retirement in 2017. Other direct variants were Soyuz-L for low Earth orbit tests of the LK lunar lander (three flights) and Soyuz-M built for a quickly abandoned military spacecraft and used for reconnaissance satellites instead (eight flights).

The aborted Soyuz 18-1 launch in 1975 was the final crewed flight of the 11A511, and as it occurred shortly before the ASTP mission, the United States requested that the Soviets provide details about this failure. They stated that Soyuz 19 would be using the newer 11A5511U booster model (i.e. Soyuz-U), so the Soyuz 18-1 malfunction had no bearing on it.

Soyuz rockets were assembled horizontally in the MIK Building at the launch site. The rocket was then rolled out, and erected on the launch pad.
