= Soyuz programme =

Human spaceflight programme of the Soviet Union

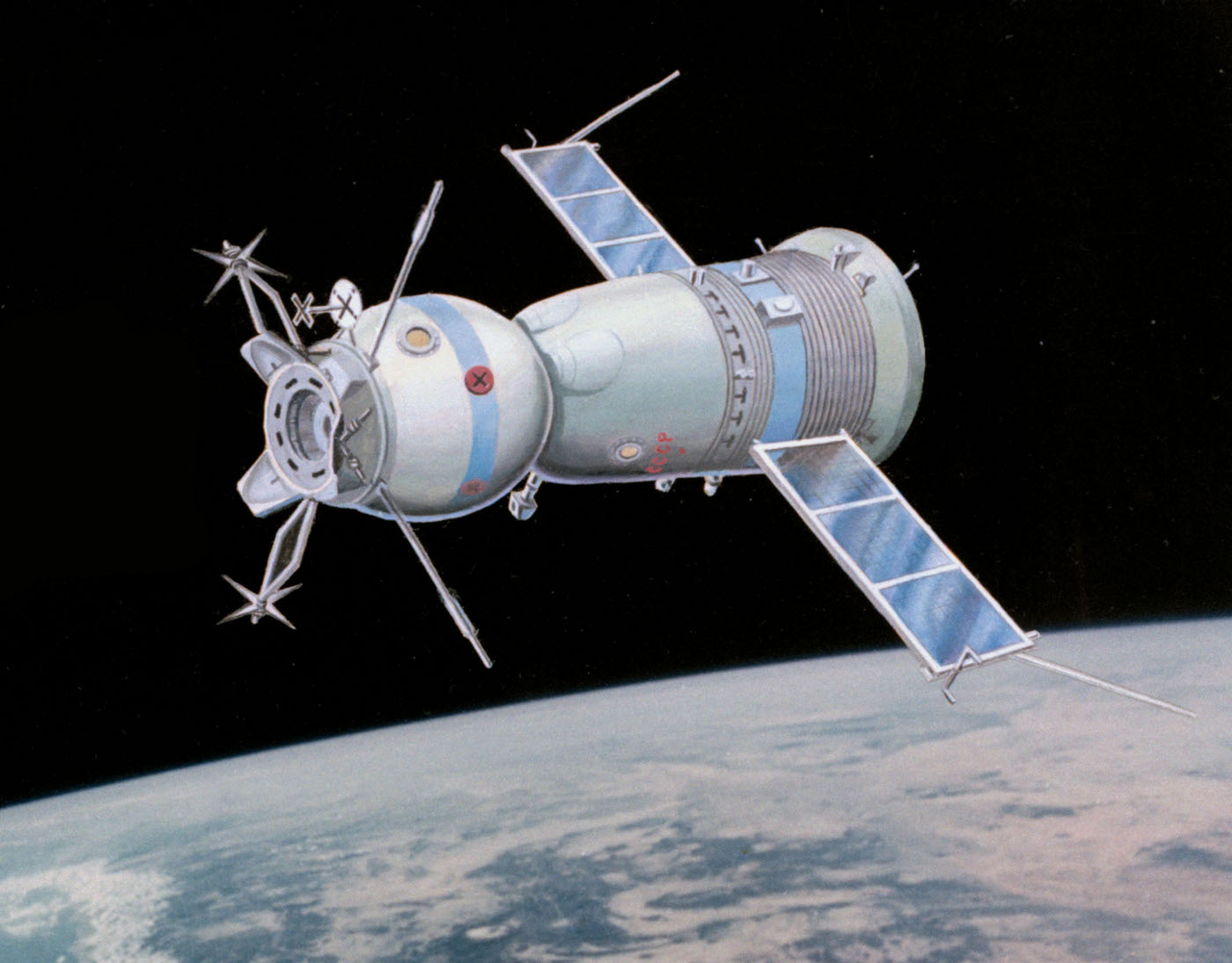
- Artist's impression of the Soyuz 19 spacecraft from the Apollo–Soyuz mission

Program overview
- Country: Soviet Union; Russia
- Organization: Roscosmos (1991–present)
- Status: Ongoing

Programme history
- First crewed flight: Soyuz 1
- Launch site: Baikonur

Vehicle information
- Uncrewed vehicle: Progress
- Crewed vehicle: Soyuz
- Crew capacity: 1–3
- Launch vehicles: Soyuz-U; Soyuz-FG; Soyuz-2

The Soyuz programme (/ˈsɔɪjuːz/ SOY-yooz, /ˈsɔː-/ SAW-; Russian: Союз [sɐˈjus], meaning "Union") is a human spaceflight programme initiated by the Soviet Union in the early 1960s. The Soyuz spacecraft was originally part of a Moon landing project intended to put a Soviet cosmonaut on the Moon. It was the third Soviet human spaceflight programme after the Vostok (1961–1963) and Voskhod (1964–1965) programmes.

The programme consists of the Soyuz capsule and the Soyuz rocket and is now the responsibility of Roscosmos. After the retirement of the Space Shuttle in 2011, the Soyuz was the only way for humans to get to the International Space Station (ISS) until 30 May 2020 when Crew Dragon flew to the ISS for the first time with astronauts.

== Soyuz rocket ==
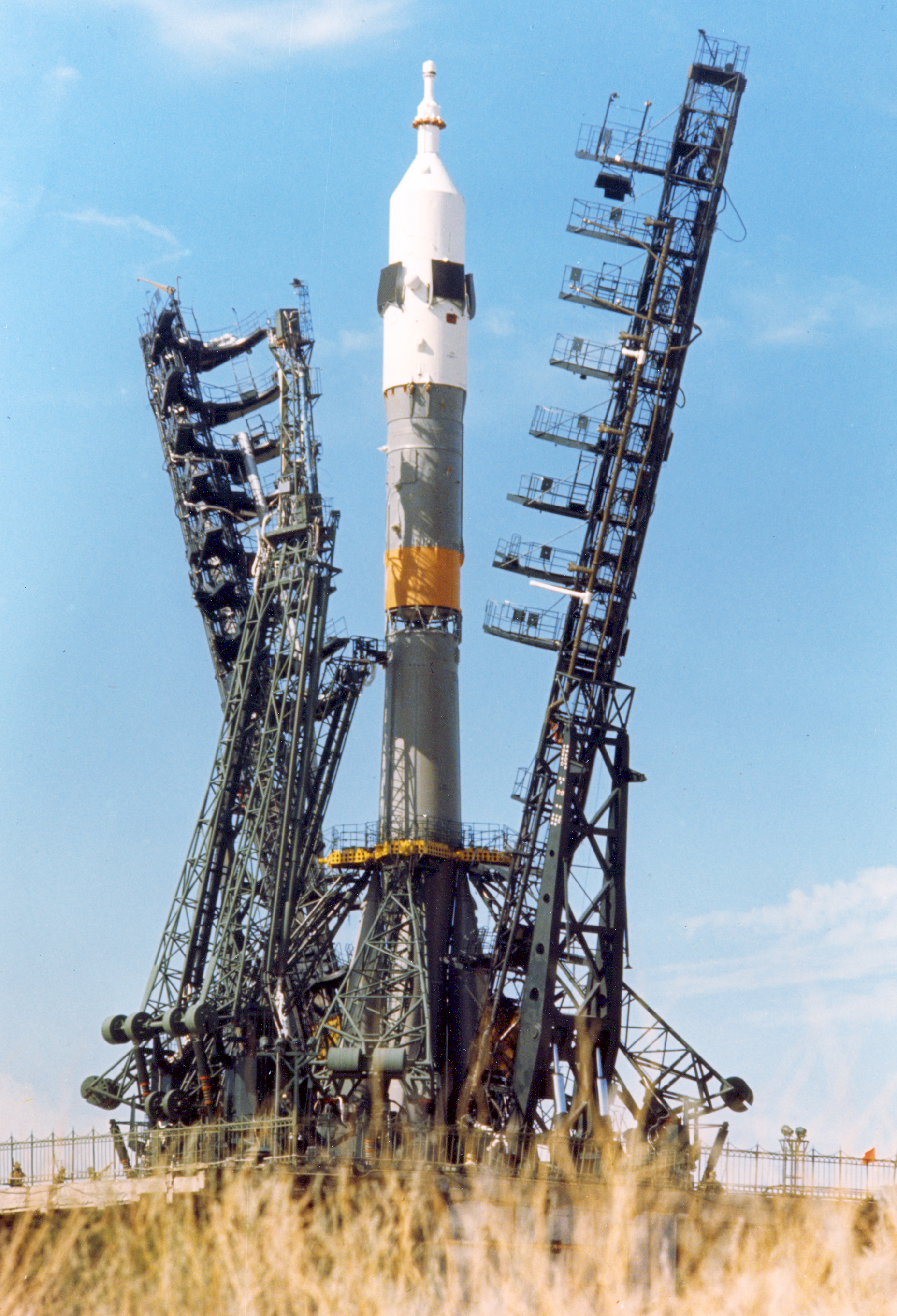
Soyuz rocket on launch pad

The launch vehicles used in the Soyuz expendable launch system are manufactured at the Progress State Research and Production Rocket Space Center (TsSKB-Progress) in Samara, Russia. As well as being used in the Soyuz programme as the launcher for the crewed Soyuz spacecraft, Soyuz launch vehicles are now also used to launch robotic Progress supply spacecraft to the International Space Station and commercial launches marketed and operated by TsSKB-Progress and the Starsem company. Currently Soyuz vehicles are launched from the Baikonur Cosmodrome in Kazakhstan and the Plesetsk Cosmodrome in northwest Russia and formerly the Guiana Space Centre in French Guiana, where launches occurred between October 2011 and February 2022 when the last launch occurred before the program was cancelled due to sanctions imposed on Russia by European nations in response to the Russia-Ukraine War.

The Soyuz rocket family is one of the most dependable and widely utilized launch vehicles in the history of space travel. It has been in operation for nearly six decades, having been developed by the Soviet Union and presently run by Russia. The Soyuz rockets have played an important role in both crewed and uncrewed space missions, launching people to the International Space Station (ISS) and delivering satellites and scientific payloads.

== Soyuz spacecraft ==
The basic Soyuz spacecraft design was the basis for many projects, many of which were never developed. Its earliest form was intended to travel to the Moon without employing a huge booster like the Saturn V or the Soviet N-1 by repeatedly docking with upper stages that had been put in orbit using the same rocket as the Soyuz. This and the initial civilian designs were done under the Soviet Chief Designer Sergei Korolev, who did not live to see the craft take flight. Several military derivatives took precedence in the Soviet design process, though they never came to pass.

A Soyuz spacecraft consists of three parts (from front to back):

- a spheroid orbital module
- a small aerodynamic reentry module
- a cylindrical service module with solar panels attached

There have been many variants of the Soyuz spacecraft, including:

- Sever early crewed spacecraft proposal to replace Vostok (1959)
  - L1-1960 crewed circumlunar spacecraft proposal (1960); evolved into the Soyuz-A design
  - L4-1960 crewed lunar orbiter proposal (1960)
  - L1-1962 crewed lunar flyby spacecraft proposal (1962); early design led to Soyuz
  - OS-1962 space station proposal (1962)
- Soyuz-A 7K-9K-11K circumlunar complex proposal (1963)
  - Soyuz 7K crewed spacecraft concept; cancelled in 1964 in favor of the LK-1
  - Soyuz 9K proposed orbital tug; cancelled in 1964 when the Soyuz 7K and Soyuz P were cancelled
  - Soyuz 11K proposed fuel tanker; cancelled in 1964 when the Soyuz 7K and Soyuz P were cancelled
- L3-1963 crewed lunar lander proposal (1963)
- L4-1963 crewed lunar orbiter proposal; modified 7K (1963)
- Soyuz 7K-OK (1967–1970)
  - Soyuz 7K-L1 Zond (1967–1970)
  - Soyuz 7K-L3 LOK (1971–1972)
  - Soyuz 7K-OKS (1971); also known as 7KT-OK
- Soyuz 7K-T or "ferry" (1973–1981)
  - Soyuz 7K-T-AF (1973); 7K-T modified for space station flight with Orion 2 space telescope
  - Soyuz 7K-T/A9 (1974–1978); 7K-T modified for flights to military Almaz space stations
- Soyuz 7K-TM (1974–1976)
  - 7K-MF6 (1976); 7K-TM modified for space station flight with MKF-6 camera
- Soyuz-T (1976–1986)
- Zarya planned 'Super Soyuz' replacement for Soyuz and Progress (1985)
  - Alpha Lifeboat rescue spacecraft based on Zarya (1995); cancelled in favor of a modified Soyuz TM
  - Big Soyuz enlarged version of Soyuz reentry vehicle (2008)
- Soyuz-TM (1986–2003)
- Soyuz TMA (2003–2012)
- Soyuz-ACTS (2006)
- Soyuz TMA-M (2010–2016)
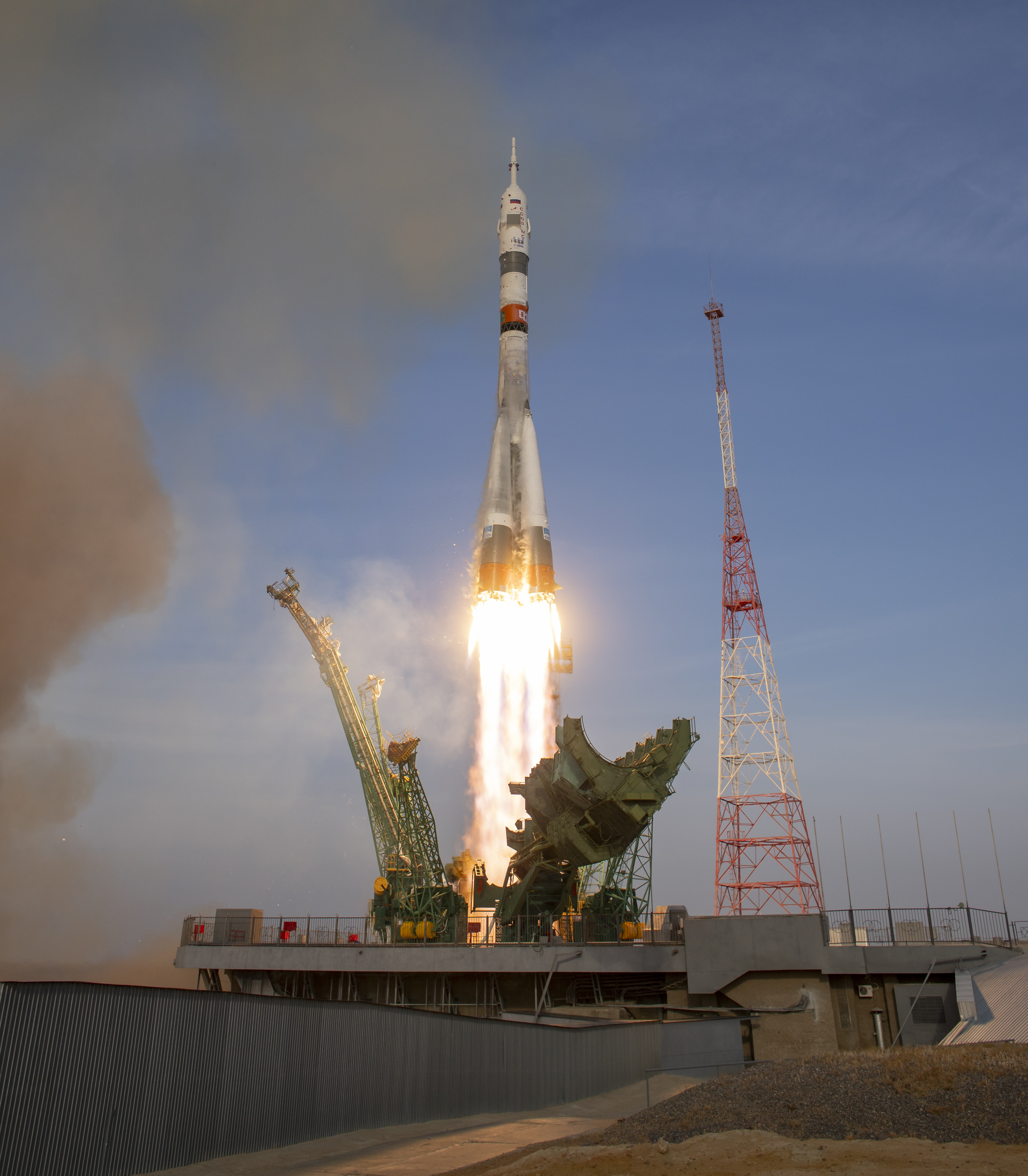
  A 2025 Soyuz-2.1a launch of Soyuz MS-28 from Site 31/6 for Expedition 74.
- Soyuz MS (since 2016)
- Military Soyuz (P, PPK, R, 7K-VI Zvezda, and OIS)
  - Soyuz P crewed satellite interceptor proposal (1962); cancelled in 1964 in favor of the Istrebitel Sputnikov program
  - Soyuz R command-reconnaissance spacecraft proposal (1962); cancelled in 1966 and replaced by Almaz
    - Soyuz 7K-TK transport spacecraft proposal for delivering cosmonauts to Soyuz R military stations (1966); cancelled in 1970 in favor of the TKS spacecraft
  - Soyuz PPK revised version of Soyuz P (1964)
  - Soyuz 7K-VI Zvezda space station proposal (1964)
  - Soyuz-VI crewed combat spacecraft proposal; cancelled in 1965
  - Soyuz OIS (1967)
    - Soyuz OB-VI space station proposal (1967)
    - Soyuz 7K-S military transport proposal (1974)
    - Soyuz 7K-ST concept for Soyuz T and TM (1974)

== Derivatives ==
The Zond spacecraft was designed to take a crew around the Moon, but never achieved the required degree of safety or political need. Zond 5 did circle the Moon in September 1968, with two tortoises and other life forms, and returned safely to Earth although in an atmospheric entry which probably would have killed human travelers.

The Progress series of robotic cargo ships for the Salyut, Mir, and ISS use the engine section, orbital module, automatic navigation, docking mechanism, and overall layout of the Soyuz spacecraft, but are incapable of reentry.

While not a direct derivative, the Chinese Shenzhou spacecraft follows the basic template originally pioneered by Soyuz.

The Soyuz MS spacecraft and its Soyuz FG rocket

== Soyuz crewed flights ==
- Soviet human spaceflight missions started in 1961 and ended in 1991 with the dissolution of the Soviet Union.
- The Russian human spaceflight missions program started in 1991 and continues to this day. Soyuz crewed missions were the only spacecraft visiting the International Space Station, starting from when the Space Shuttle program ended in 2011, until the launch of Crew Dragon Demo-2 on 30 May 2020. The International Space Station always has at least one Soyuz spacecraft docked at all times for use as an escape craft.

== Soyuz uncrewed flights ==
1. Kosmos 133 - launch failure
2. Kosmos 140 - reentry damage
3. Kosmos 186
4. Kosmos 188
5. Kosmos 212
6. Kosmos 213
7. Kosmos 238
8. Soyuz 2 - failed to dock
9. Kosmos 379
10. Kosmos 396
11. Kosmos 434
12. Kosmos 496
13. Kosmos 573
14. Kosmos 613
15. Kosmos 638
16. Kosmos 656
17. Kosmos 670
18. Kosmos 672
19. Kosmos 772 - partial fail
20. Soyuz 20
21. Kosmos 869
22. Kosmos 1001
23. Kosmos 1074
24. Soyuz 34
25. Soyuz T-1
26. Soyuz TM-1
27. Soyuz MS-14
28. Soyuz MS-23

== Gallery ==
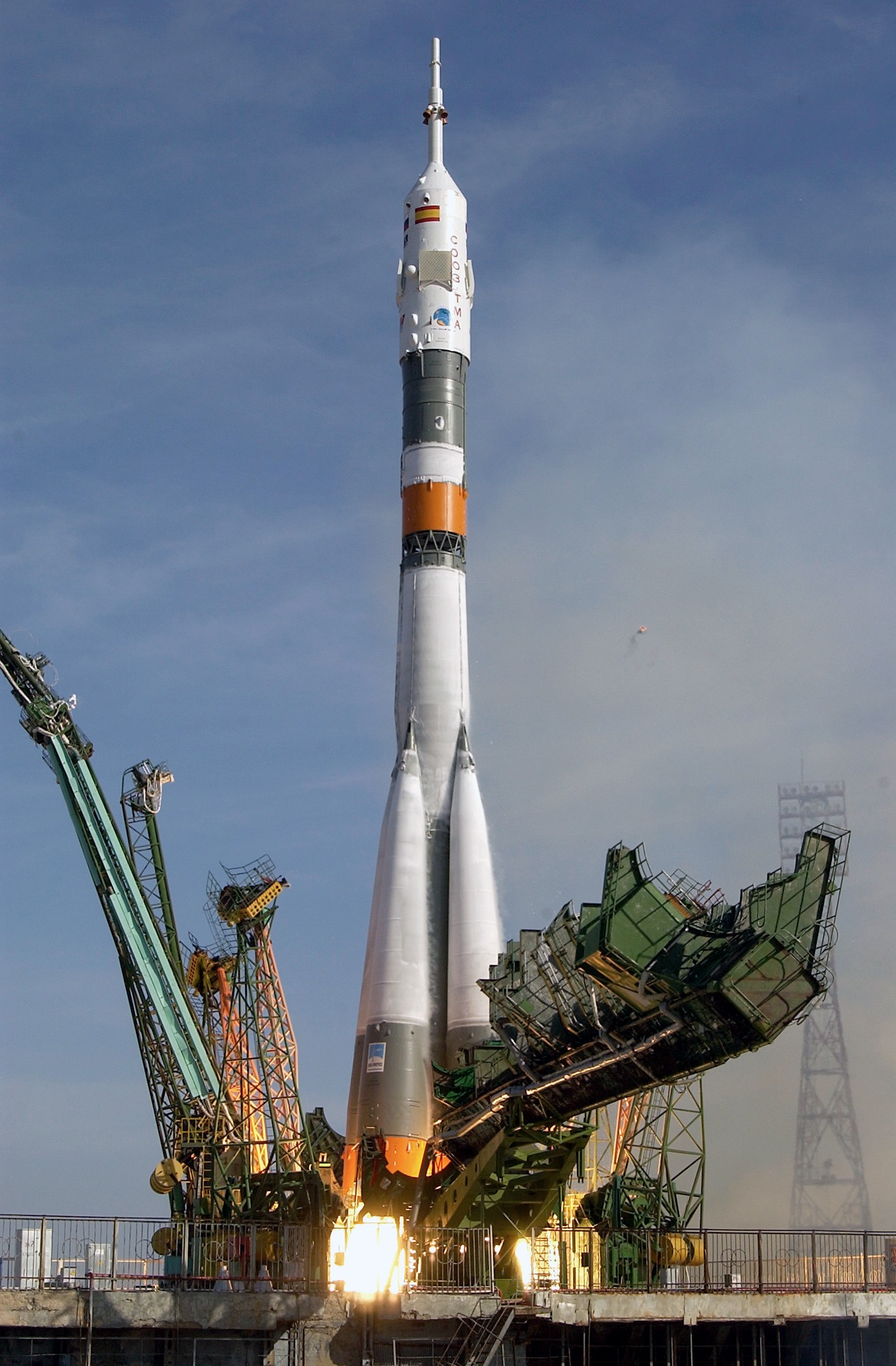
Soyuz TMA-3 launch

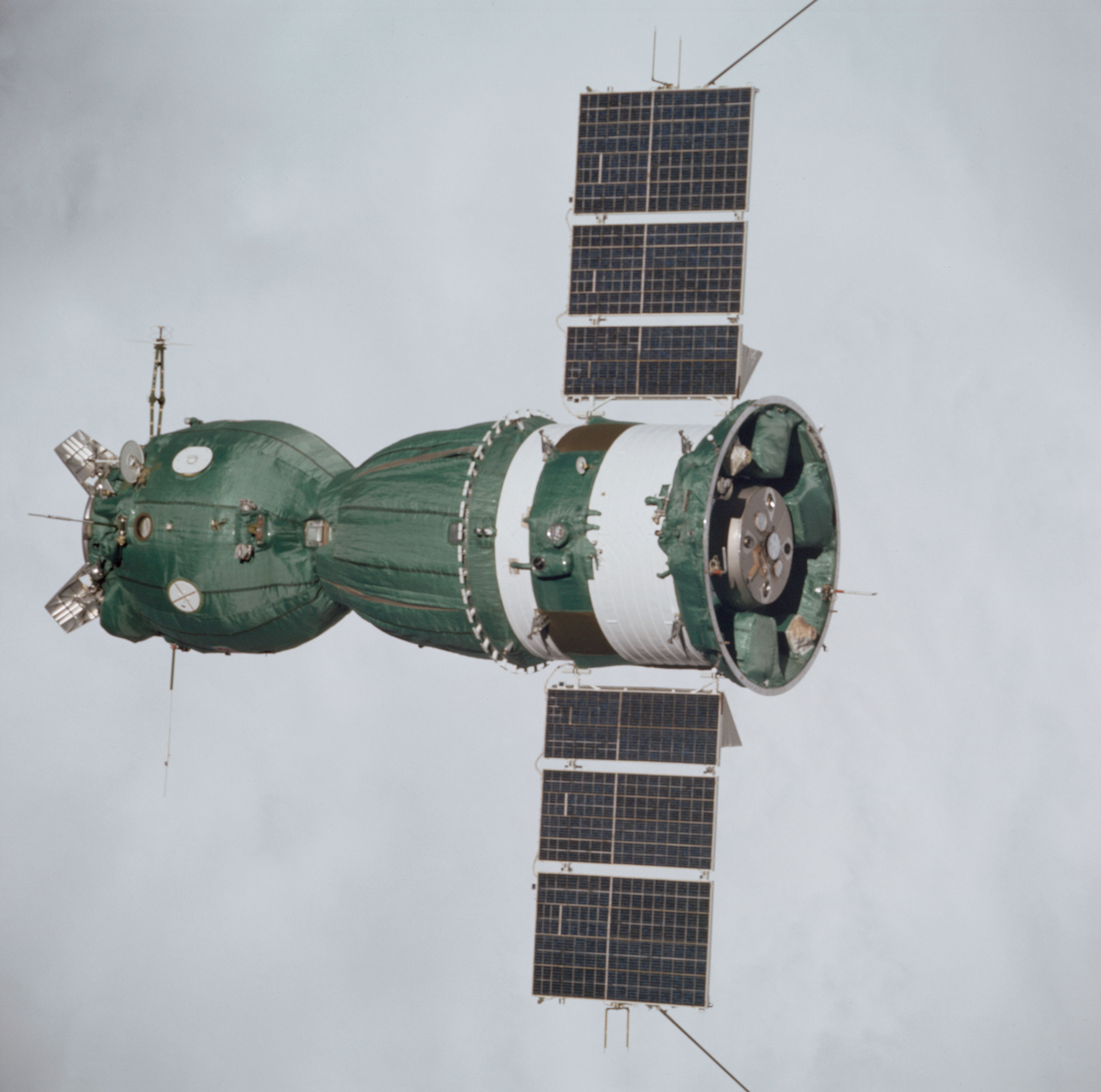
Soyuz 19 as seen from the Apollo spacecraft during Apollo–Soyuz Test Project, July 1975

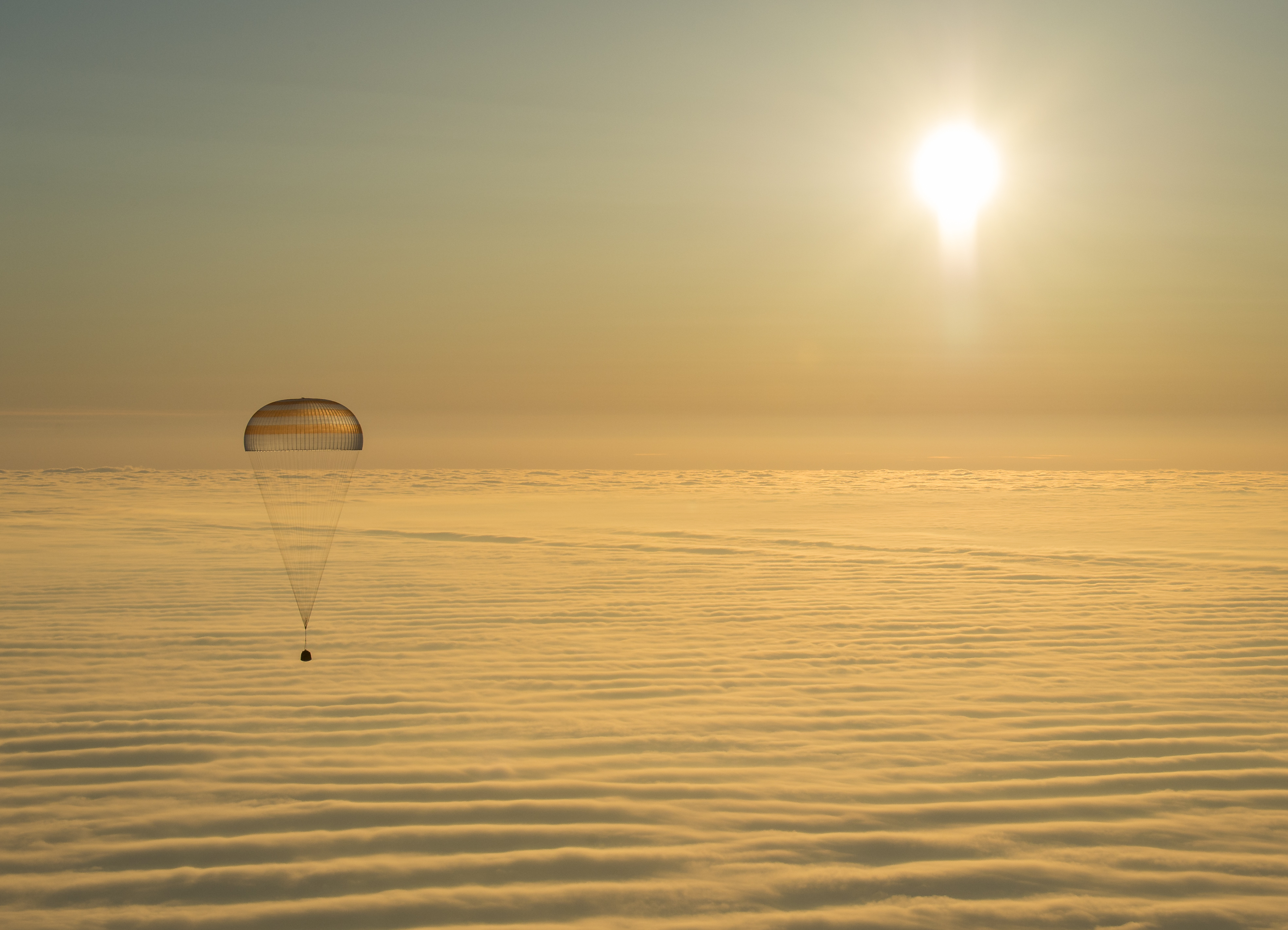
Soyuz TMA-14M landing

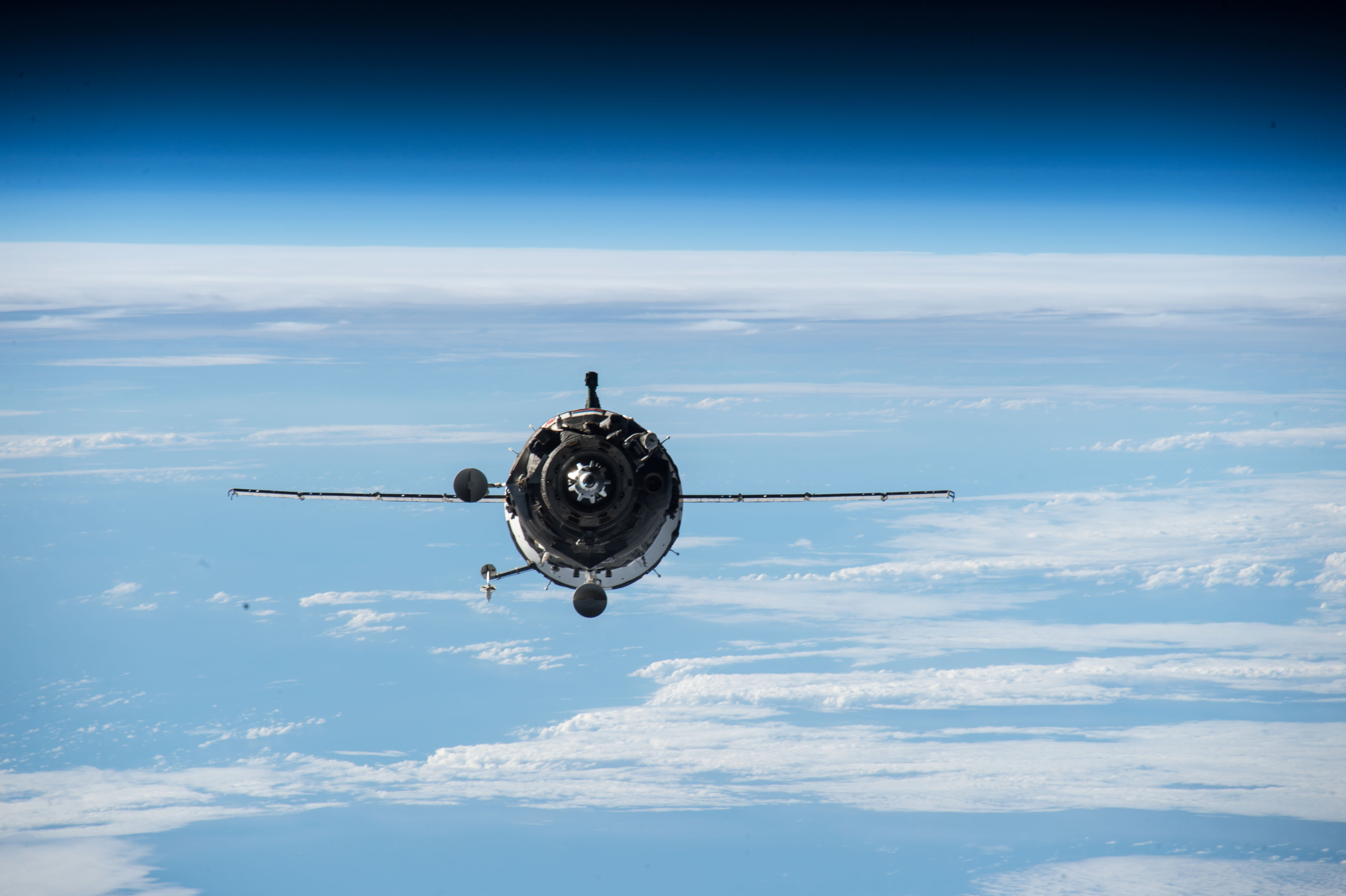
Soyuz TMA-16M approaching the ISS

== See also ==
- Shenzhou, a Chinese spacecraft influenced by Soyuz
- Space Shuttle
- Buran (spacecraft)
- List of spaceflight-related accidents and incidents
