= Soyuz 7K-T-AF =

Crewed spacecraft of the Soyuz programme as a Space Observatory Station

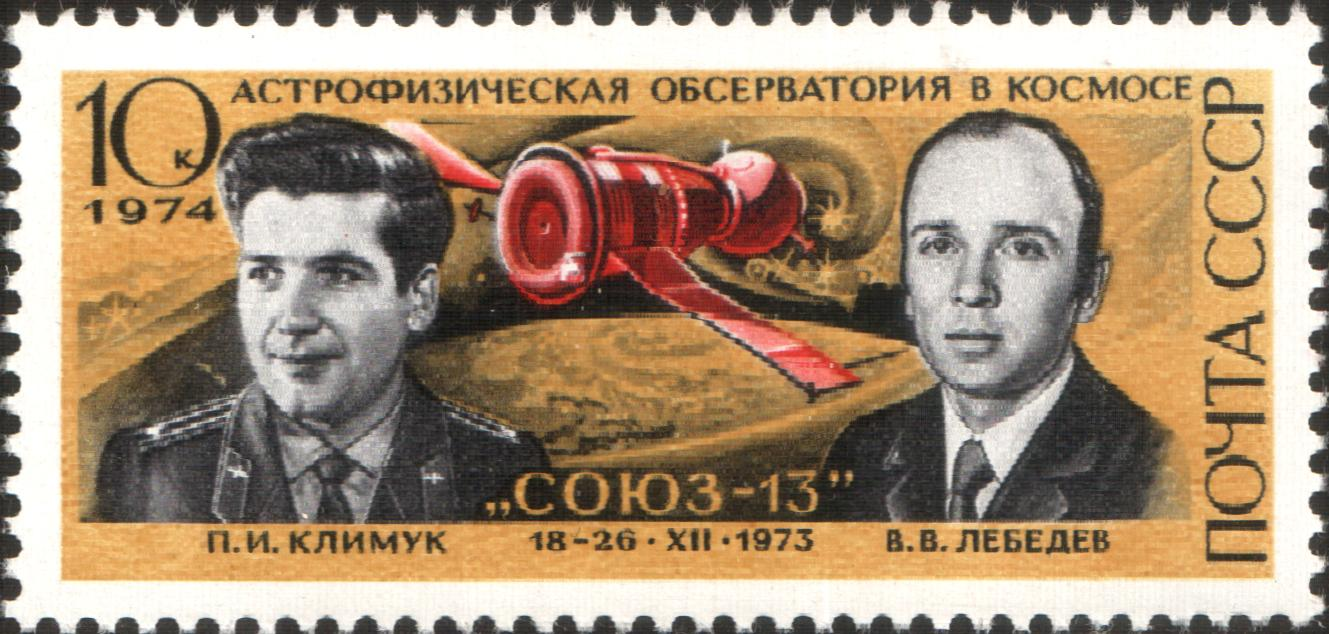
- Crew and Soyuz 7K-T-AF on Soviet Stamp
- Manufacturer: Experimental Design Bureau (OKB-1)
- Country of origin: Soviet Union
- Operator: Soviet space program
- Applications: Crewed spacecraft as Space Observatory Station

Specifications
- Launch mass: 6,570 kilograms (14,480 lb)
- Dimensions: Height 7.94 metres (26.0 ft) Volume 9,000 cubic metres (320,000 cu ft)
- Power: Solar arrays output 1.3 kW from 10 square metres (110 sq ft) on 4-segments
- Equipment: Orion 2 astrophysical camera
- Regime: Low Earth orbit
- Design life: Up to 35 days, used for 7.87 days

Production
- Status: No longer in service
- Built: 1
- Launched: 1
- Maiden launch: Soyuz 13; 18 December 1973
- Last launch: Soyuz 13

Related spacecraft
- Derived from: Soyuz 7K-T
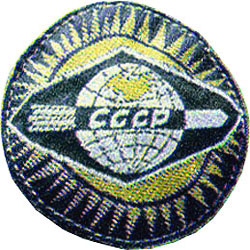
- Vimpel Diamond for entrainment patch

Soyuz 7K-T-AF is a version of the Soyuz spacecraft and was the first spacecraft designed for space station flights, a dedicated science mission. Its only crewed flight was conducted in 1973 with Soyuz 13 of the Soyuz programme.

== Design and flight ==
The one craft of the Soyuz 7K-T-AF was modified from the original Soyuz 7K-T with the addition of observatory and solar arrays. This was the second test flight of the redesigned Soyuz 7K-T, the second generation of the Soyuz spacecraft. The Soyuz 7K-T-AF flew once on Soyuz 13. The Soyuz 7K-T-AF was in the 7K-TM Configuration. Soyuz 7K-T-AF propulsion was from a KTDU-35, two liquid rocket engines. Soyuz 13/7K-T-AF was the first manned space observatory. Soyuz 7K-T-AF/Soyuz 13 housed the Orion 2 Space Observatory, operated by crew member Valentin Lebedev. Orion 2 Space Observatory was an Ultraviolet (UV) Telescope. The first Soviet UV Telescope was Orion 1 used on orbital station Salyut 1. The other crew member was Pyotr Klimuk.

With the Orion 2 astrophysical telescope and camera, the crew made observations of stars in the ultraviolet light range. Also added to Soyuz 7K-T-AF was experiment that photographed spectrozonal areas of the earth's surface. Soyuz 7K-T-AF landed in snowstorm 200 kilometres (120 mi) Southwest Karaganda. The observatory equipment was added to the top of nose cone of the spacecraft. The observatory equipment was mounted were the docking port is mounted on the Soyuz 7K-OKS version. Soyuz 22/Soyuz 7K-MF6 spacecraft would be the next 7K-T with observatory equipment mounted at the craft's docking port.

== See also ==
- Comparison of crewed space vehicles
