= Rocket Astrophysical Observatories K-2, K-3 and K-4 =

Astrophysical observatories launched from the Soviet Union

Rocket astrophysical observatories K-2, K-3 and K-4 were launched in Soviet Union in the 1960s and early 1970s under the direction of Grigor Gurzadyan of Byurakan Observatory in Armenia, for the study of the Solar ultraviolet and X-ray emission.

== Technology ==
R-5 Pobeda ballistic rockets were used, launched from Kapustin Yar military base. The 500 km altitude flights, after the first 120 km of active regime, were performing 8–9 minutes of observations, with further parachute landing of the payload.

== Sensors ==
The observatories of K-2, K-3 and K-4 series while undergoing ever developing modifications and combinations, included:

- Lyman alpha camera for Solar chromospheric imaging, of 500 mm focal length, 70 mm slit;
- coronal slit Roland spectrograph of wavelength range 500-1300 A and spectral resolution 0.1 A;
- chromospheric spectrograph of 700-1800 A of resolution 0.1 A;
- camera for coronal imaging at 2000-3000 A and up to 24 Solar radii distance from Solar disk;
- camera for monochromatic imaging at 304 HeII and 584 HeI lines of 50 mm slit and of focal length 250 mm;
- Solar imaging cameras at wavelengths shorter than 60 A, of focal length 150 mm and angular resolution up to 1 arc minute;
- X-ray spectrograph for Solar corona spectra at 10-150 A, with dispersion 3A/mm.

The safe return of the payload enabled its use at several flights. During the launch of October 1, 1965 the most powerful Solar X-ray flare among ever detected by then, was observed. The launch of October 3, 1970 also was notable The very first launch was performed at February 15, 1961, during a Solar eclipse.

== Successors ==
In the 1970s Gurzadyan's team, then in Garni Space Astronomy Laboratory in Armenia, developed the orbital Orion 1 and Orion 2 Space Observatories, installed onboard space station Salyut 1 and Soyuz 13, respectively.
