= Soyuz 7K-MF6 =

Crewed spacecraft of the Soyuz programme as an Earth Observatory Station

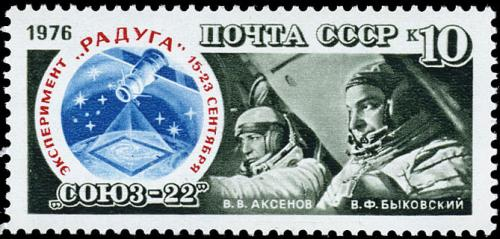
- Soyuz 7K-MF6 and crew on a Soviet stamp
- Manufacturer: Experimental Design Bureau (OKB-1)
- Country of origin: Soviet Union
- Operator: Soviet space program
- Applications: Crewed spacecraft as Earth Observatory Station

Specifications
- Launch mass: 6,510 kilograms (14,350 lb)
- Dimensions: Height 7.6 metres (25 ft) Volume 9,000 cubic metres (320,000 cu ft)
- Power: Solar arrays output 1.3 kW from 10 square metres (110 sq ft) on 4-segments
- Equipment: MF6 multispectral camera
- Regime: Low Earth orbit
- Design life: Up to 35 days, used for 8 days

Production
- Status: Out of service
- Built: 1
- Launched: 1

Related spacecraft
- Derived from: Soyuz 7K-TM; Soyuz 7K-T
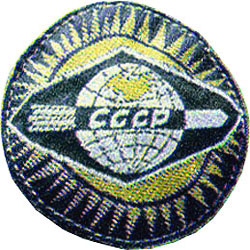
- Vimpel Diamond for entrainment patch

Soyuz 7K-MF6 is a version of the Soyuz spacecraft and was the second Soviet spacecraft designed for space station flight, a dedicated science mission. Its only crewed flight was conducted in 1976 with Soyuz 22 of the Soyuz programme.

== Design and flight ==
| Mission | Crew | Launch | Landing | Duration | Notes |
|---|---|---|---|---|---|
| Soyuz 22 | (Soviet Union) Valery Bykovsky (Soviet Union) Vladimir Aksyonov | 15 Sept 1976 | 23 Sept 1976 | 8 days | Earth sciences and (possibly a) reconnaissance mission. Final crewed Soyuz spaceflight to not visit a space station |

The one craft of the Soyuz 7K-MF6 was modified from the original Soyuz 7K-TM/Soyuz 7K-T with the addition of observatory platform. The Soyuz 7K-MF6 flew once on Soyuz 22. Soyuz 7K-MF6 propulsion was from a KTDU-35, liquid rocket engine. Soyuz 7K-MF6 was the second Soviet manned space observatory, the first was Soyuz 13/Soyuz 7K-T-AF. Soyuz 7K-MF6/Soyuz 2 housed the MKF-6 multi-spectral camera. The spectral camera was used for photography of Earth. The multi-spectral camera was manufactured by Carl Zeiss-Jena in East Germany. The universal docking port was removed and a multispectral camera was installed in its place. The observatory equipment was added to the top of nose cone of the spacecraft. Soyuz 7K-MF6 started as the back up spacecraft for the Apollo–Soyuz project, a Soyuz ASTP craft # 74. The Soyuz ASTP was modified in 1976 to become 7K-MF6, after it was not need for the Apollo–Soyuz project that ended in 1975, which used spacecraft Soyuz 19 and Apollo CSM-111.

== See also ==
- Comparison of crewed space vehicles
