= Grigor Gurzadyan =

Armenian astronomer (1922–2014)

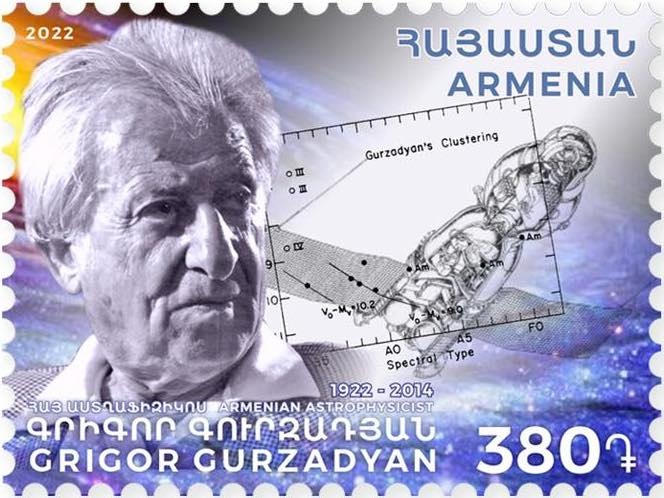
- Gurzadyan on a 2022 stamp of Armenia
- Born: 15 October 1922; Baghdad, Kingdom of Iraq (modern-day Baghdad, Iraq)
- Died: 22 February 2014 (aged 91); Yerevan, Armenia
- Citizenship: Soviet Union, Armenia
- Awards: Mesrop Mashtots Medal (2011)
- Scientific career
- Fields: Astrophysics

Grigor Gurzadyan (Armenian: Գրիգոր Գուրզադյան) (15 October 1922 – 22 February 2014) was an Armenian astronomer, and pioneer of space astronomy.

== Life ==
Gurzadyan was born in 1922 in Baghdad, to parents that survived the Armenian genocide. Upon graduating from the Hydrotechnical and Constructional Department of Yerevan Polytechnic Institute in 1944, he became a graduate student of Victor Ambartsumian, who had just moved to Armenia. Being in Ambartsumian’s founding team of Byurakan Observatory, he later headed a Laboratory, in 1960s became deputy director of the Observatory for space research. Then, he headed the branch of Byurakan observatory on space research. In 1971 he founded and headed the Garni Space Astronomy Laboratory (Institute, 1992–2004). Member of Armenian National Academy of Sciences (1986; corresponding member 1965), DSci. 1955, PhD 1948. His son is Vahe Gurzadyan, mathematical physicist and a professor at Yerevan Physics Institute, whose main research topics are: the chaos in non-linear systems, N-body dynamics, stellar dynamics, Cosmic Microwave Background radiation, observational cosmology.

== Works ==
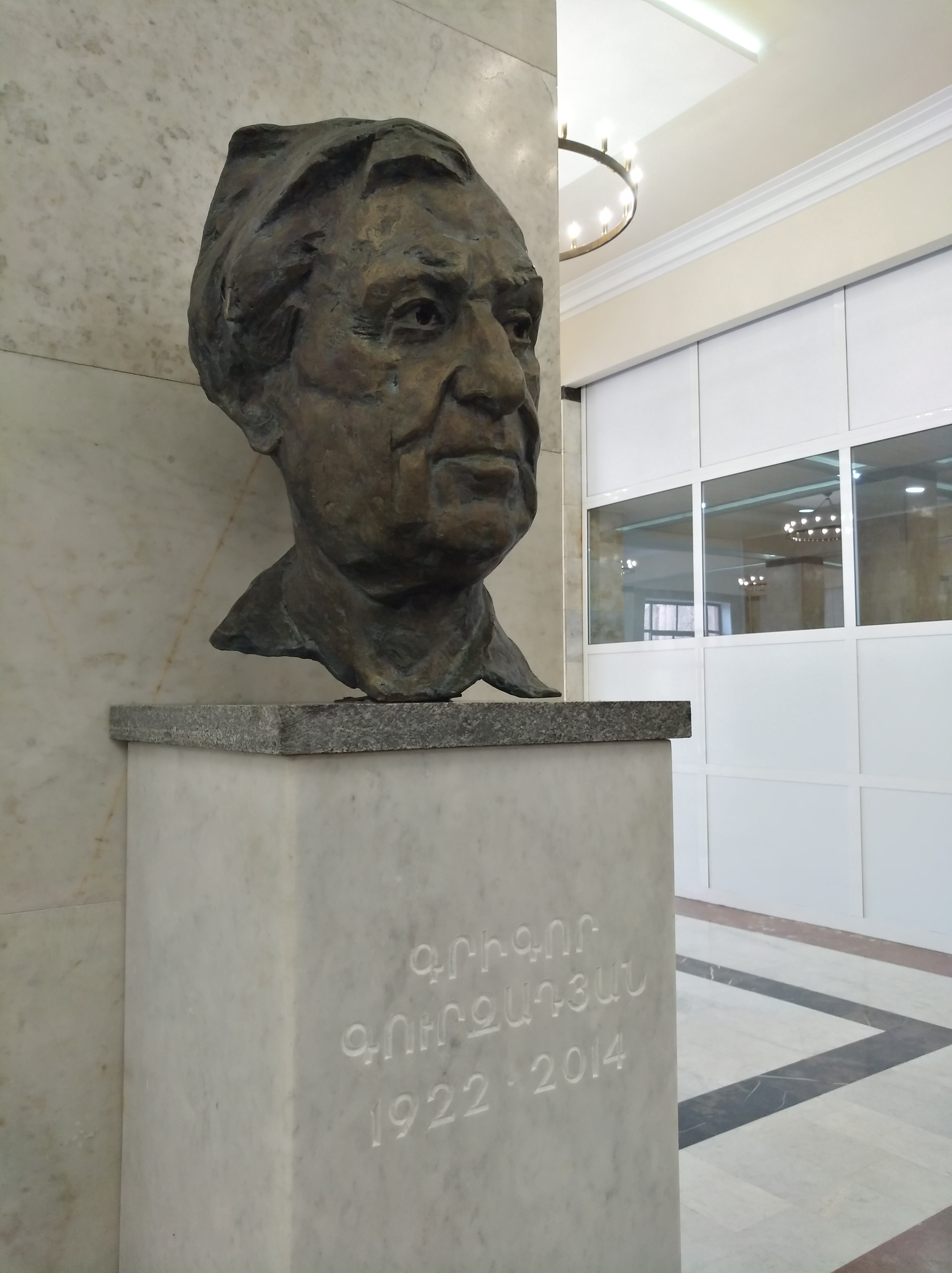
Gurzadyan's bust at Yerevan State University

In 1960s and early 1970s he directed the UV and X-ray observations of the Sun via Rocket Astrophysical Observatories K-2, K-3 and K-4 by means of ballistic rockets R-5; the first launch being on 15 February 1961 from Kapustin Yar military base in Russia. His paper in Comm. Armenian Acad. Sciences, XLIII, 28, 1966, “A Powerful X-ray Flare on the Sun” (of 1 October 1965) is on the detection of most powerful Solar X-ray flare observed by then.

Then he moved to design space orbital observatories, both on board automatic probes and crewed spacecraft. Ultraviolet telescope Procyon was on board Kosmos 309 in 1969, and X-ray telescope Altair on board Meteor 1–16 in 1974; both were launched from Plesetsk cosmodrome. Orion 1 Space Observatory (see Orion 1 and Orion 2 Space Observatories) the first space telescope with an objective prism, was installed in April 1971 onboard the first space station Salyut 1. The highlight was Orion 2 Space Observatory (see Orion 1 and Orion 2 Space Observatories), with a wide-angle meniscus telescope of the Cassegrain system, operated on board the spacecraft Soyuz 13 in December 1973. Spectra of thousands of stars to as faint as 13th magnitude were obtained, the first satellite UV spectrogram of a planetary nebula (IC 2149) was obtained, revealing lines of aluminum and titanium - elements not previously observed in planetary nebulae, two photon emission from nebulae was detected for the first time. For comparison, the Skylab’s UV telescope which was on the orbit at the same time, could only look at stars down to 7.5th magnitude.

He predicted magnetic fields in planetary nebulae in 1960s, which were actually discovered in 2005 (Jordan, Werner, O’Toole). He authored theoretical papers on flare stars (predicted negative infrared flares), interstellar matter, binary stars. In 1990s he developed the theory of common chromospheres (roundchromes) of close binary stars and of evolution of binary globular clusters.

For decades he lectured in Yerevan State University (theoretical astrophysics, celestial mechanics) and in Yerevan Polytechnic Institute (precise mechanics). He is also known as an original painter and for his essays on philosophy of science and art.

Gurzadyan died on 22 February 2014 in Yerevan. His requiem service was attended by the President of Armenia and the service was held by Supreme Patriarch and Catholicos of all Armenians.

== Bibliography ==
- G.A.Gurzadyan, Problems of Dynamics of Planetary Nebulae, Arm. Acad. Publ. 1954.
- G.A.Gurzadyan, Radioastrophysics, Arm. Acad. Publ.,1956.
- G.A.Gurzadyan, Planetary Nebulae, Nauka, Moscow, 1962; Gordon & Breach, 1970;ISBN 90-277-0117-2,ISBN 978-90-277-0117-6
- G.A.Gurzadyan, Flare Stars, Nauka, 1973; Pergamon, 1980;ISBN 0-08-023035-0
- G.A.Gurzadyan et al., Observatory in Space: SOYUZ 13 – ORION 2 . “Mashinostroenie” Publ., Moscow, 1984.
- G.A.Gurzadyan, Stellar Chromospheres, Nauka, Moscow, 1984.
- G.A.Gurzadyan, Physics and Dynamics of Planetary Nebulae, Nauka, Moscow, 1988; Springer, 1997;ISBN 3-540-60965-2
- G.A.Gurzadyan, Theory of Interplanetary Flights, Nauka, Moscow, 1992; Gordon & Breach, 1996;ISBN 2-88449-074-4
- G.A.Gurzadyan, Space Dynamics, Francis & Taylor, 2002;ISBN 0-415-28202-0
- G.A.Gurzadyan, World of Galaxies, Zangak, Yerevan, 2004
