= Military Soyuz =

Soviet military spacecraft designs

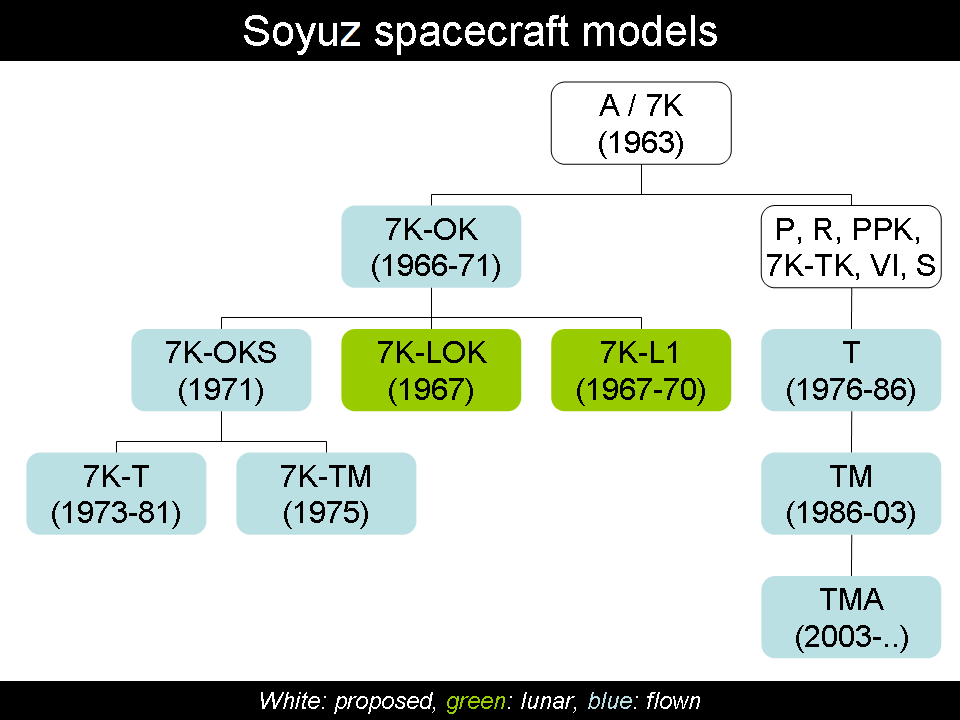
Soyuz family tree

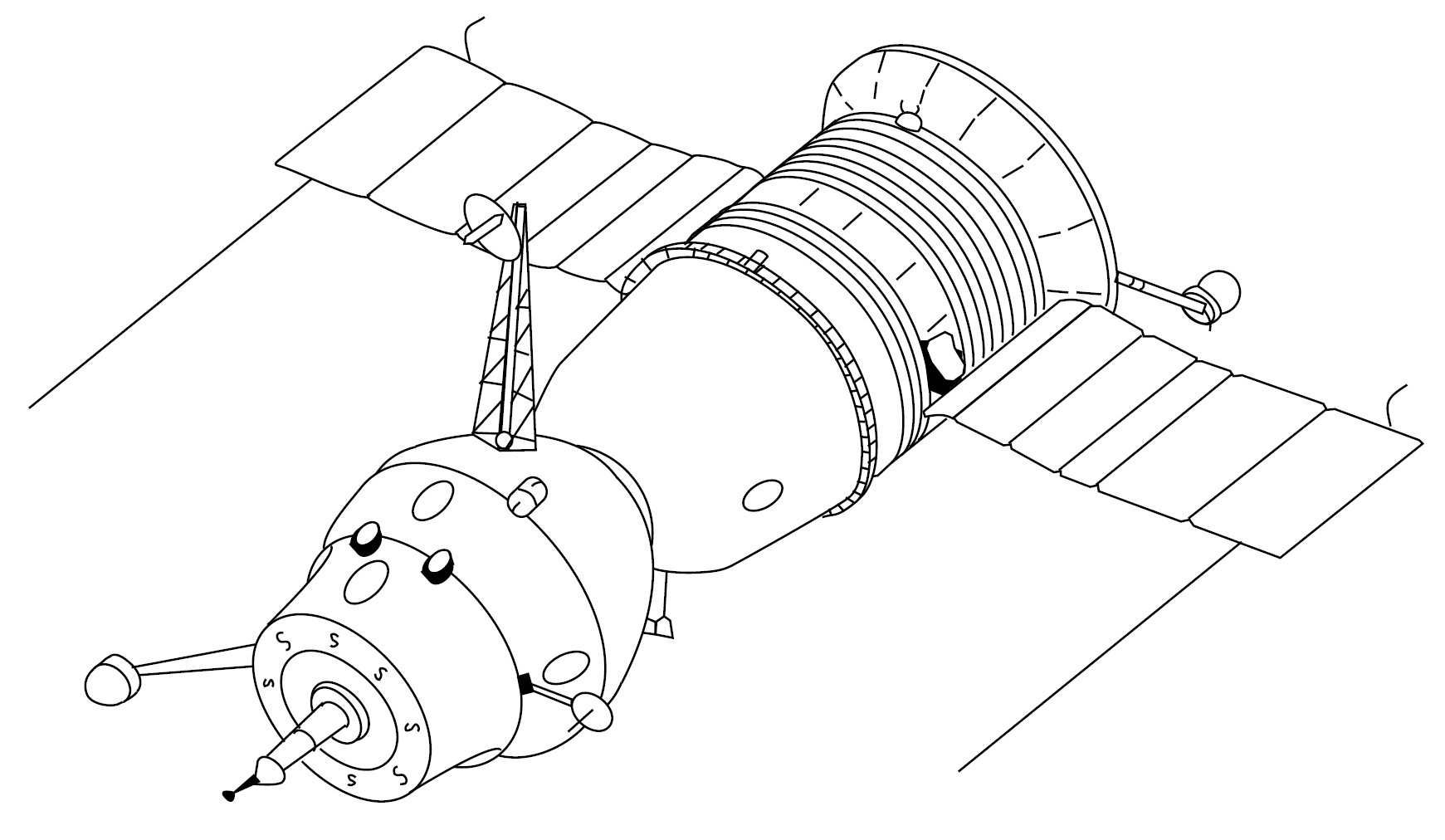
Soyuz 7K-OK spacecraft with an active docking unit

The Soviet Union planned several military Soyuz spacecraft models. These versions were named Soyuz P, Soyuz PPK, Soyuz R, Soyuz 7K-VI, and Soyuz OIS (Orbital Research Station). However, none of the spacecraft ever flew in space.

== Soyuz P, R and PPK ==
=== Soyuz P ===
The Soyuz P (Perekhvatchik, Interceptor) space interceptor and Soyuz R (Razvedki, intelligence) command-reconnaissance spacecraft was proposed in December 1962 by Sergei Korolev. In the initial draft project, the Soyuz P would use the Soyuz 9K rocket stage and Soyuz 11K tanker spacecraft to conduct a series of dockings and re-fueling operations. The complete complex would then conduct intercepts of enemy satellites in orbits up to 6,000 km in altitude. Soyuz P was cancelled in 1963.

=== Soyuz R ===
The Soyuz-R system (1963–1966) consisted of two separately launched spacecraft, including the small orbital station 11F71 with photo-reconnaissance and electronic intelligence equipment and a Soyuz 7K-TK for crew transport. Soyuz R was cancelled in 1966.

=== Soyuz PPK ===
Initially the Soyuz P was designed for piloted inspection and destruction of enemy satellites. It was intended that the Soyuz would rendezvous with the target satellite. To minimize risk to the crew, a new version, Soyuz PPK (pilotiruemovo korablya-perekhvatchika, crewed interceptor spacecraft) was later proposed in 1964.

== Soyuz 7K-VI Zvezda ==
The Zvezda (star) station was based on a radically modified Soyuz begun in October 1965. Dmitri Kozlov was the chief engineer of the Soyuz VI project, he also worked on Soyuz-P and Soyuz-R. Soyuz 7K-VI objectives were crew earth observation, orbital inspection and destruction of enemy satellites. Zvezda would be powered by two plutonium radioisotope thermoelectric generators, as solar arrays required the spacecraft to be position to the sun, not a desired attack mode. Also the military experiments need more power than solar provided. Soyuz 7K-VI had a recoilless gun for defense. It was designed for shooting in a vacuum and defending the military research spacecraft from enemy satellite inspector and interceptor satellites. The gun was aimed by maneuvering the entire spacecraft. A special gunsight was installed in the descent module for aiming the gun. A forward docking apparatus to allow docking with Almaz was also included. Work on Zvezda was cancelled in 1967 with a single prototype in advanced stages of construction. Cosmonaut training for the VI began in September 1966. The cosmonaut group selected included commander Pavel Popovich, pilot Alexei Gubarev, flight-engineers Yuri Artyukhin, Vladimir Gulyaev, Boris Nikolaevich Belousov, and Gennadiy Kolesnikov. Popovich-Kolesnikov and Gubarev-Belousov were the prime crews, with the other engineers acting as reserves and then assigned to later crews.

== Soyuz OIS (Orbital Research Station) ==
The Soyuz OIS (Orbital Research Station) would consist of a separately-launched orbital block 11F731 OB-VI and a transport Soyuz 7K-S.

=== Soyuz OB-VI ===
The Soyuz OB-VI would be launched for 30-day missions in a 51.6° orbit at 250 x 270 km. Power was provided by solar panels, and the payload included 700 to 1,000 kg of instrumentation. The total mass would be around 6,500 kg (14,300 lb).

=== Soyuz 7K-S ===
The initial Soyuz 7K-S program was to consist of four uncrewed, followed by two crewed test flights, then two operational launches. Cosmonauts were assigned to the project in 1973.

In 1975, the project was cancelled. At that time the launch escape system for 7K-S was ready and was used for Apollo-Soyuz Test Project flights. Three complete vehicles were launched as uncrewed test missions:

Mission	Crew	Launch	Landing	Duration	Notes
Kosmos 670	None	6 Aug 1974, 00:02	8 Aug 1974, 23:59	2 days, 23 hours and 57 minutes	
Kosmos 772	None	29 Sept 1975, 04:15	3 Oct 1975, 04:10	3 days, 23 hours and 55 minutes	
Kosmos 869	None	29 Nov 1976, 16:00	17 Dec 1976, 10:31	17 days, 18 hours and 31 minutes	

=== Soyuz 7K-ST ===
The Soyuz 7K-ST transport project was develop in parallel to the military 7K-S and was redesigned for a crew of three, eventually becoming the Soyuz-T used with the Salyut space stations.

==== Specifications ====
- Crew Size: 2
- Total Length: 7.5 m
- Maximum Diameter: 2.7 m
- Total Habitable Volume: 9.00 m3
- Total Mass: 6,800 kg
- Primary Engine Thrust: 400 kgf
- Main Engine Propellants: N_{2}O_{4}/UDMH
- Main Engine Isp: 305 seconds
- Electrical System: Solar panels

== Relation with other Soyuz versions ==
The list below shows proposed, flown (in bold) and military (in italic) Soyuz versions.

- Soyuz A (1963)
  - **Soyuz 7K-OK** (1967–71)
    - **Soyuz 7K-OKS** (1971)
      - **Soyuz 7K-T** (1973–81)
      - **Soyuz 7K-TM** (1975)
  - **Soyuz 7K-LOK** (1967)
    - **Soyuz 7K-L1** (1967–70)
      - **Soyuz 7K-L1E** (1970–71)
  - Soyuz P (1962)
    - Soyuz PPK (1964)
  - Soyuz R (1962)
    - Soyuz 7K-TK (1966)
  - Soyuz 7K-VI Zvezda (1964)
  - Soyuz OIS (1967)
    - Soyuz OB-VI (1967)
    - Soyuz 7K-S (1974)
    - Soyuz 7K-ST (1974)
      - **Soyuz T** (1976–86)
      - **Soyuz TM** (1986–02)
      - **Soyuz TMA** (2002–12)
      - **Soyuz TMA-M** (2010–16)
      - **Soyuz MS** (2016-...)

== See also ==
- List of space stations
- Salyut programme
