= Soyuz 7K-TK =

- Manufacturer: Korolev
- Country of origin: Soviet Union
- Operator: Soviet space program
- Applications: Transporting cosmonauts to Soyuz R space stations

Specifications
- Launch mass: 6,800 kilograms (15,000 lb)
- Regime: Low Earth Orbit

Production
- Status: Cancelled
- Built: None

Related spacecraft
- Derivatives: Soyuz 7K-OKS

Soyuz 7K-TK (Russian: Союз 7К-ТК meaning Union 7K-TK) was a proposed Soviet spacecraft, which was designed for delivering cosmonauts to Soyuz R piloted military stations. This Soyuz version was equipped with both rendezvous and docking equipment was the basis for the Soyuz 7K-OKS space station ferry which flew two crewed flights in 1971.

Because Sergei Korolev, head of the OKB-1 bureau, had died in surgery in January 1966, the Soyuz 7K-R project was cancelled. Potential was still seen in the Soyuz 7K-TK, and so control of the project was handed over to Vladimir Chelomey's bureau to be developed as a transport spacecraft for the Almaz program.

Due to the delays in the Almaz program, further development of the 7K-TK was suspended in December 1966. It was expected that the first 7K-TK/Almaz complex would be tested uncrewed in 1968 and would fly crewed thereafter in 1969. However, due to further delays and the Chelomey's preference of the TKS spacecraft in June 1970, the Soyuz 7K-TK program was cancelled and never reached flight.

== See also ==
- Almaz
- Soyuz programme
- Soyuz (spacecraft)
- TKS (spacecraft)
