= Kosmos 613 =

Soviet Soyuz test

- Mission type: Test flight
- COSPAR ID: 1973-096A
- SATCAT no.: 6957
- Mission duration: 60 days

Spacecraft properties
- Spacecraft: Soyuz 7K-T No.34A
- Manufacturer: NPO Energia

Start of mission
- Launch date: 30 November 1973, 05:20:00 UTC
- Rocket: Soyuz
- Launch site: Baikonur 1/5

End of mission
- Landing date: 29 January 1974, 05:29 UTC

Orbital parameters
- Reference system: Geocentric
- Regime: Low Earth
- Perigee altitude: 251 kilometres (156 mi)
- Apogee altitude: 383 kilometres (238 mi)
- Inclination: 51.5 degrees
- Period: 90.86 minutes
- Epoch: 31 December 1973

Kosmos 613 (Russian: Космос 613 meaning Cosmos 613) was a long-duration orbital storage test of the Soyuz Ferry in preparation for long stays attached to a space station.

The Soyuz 11 tragedy had raised some questions about Soyuz's ability to withstand long-duration space missions, although the spacecraft had otherwise functioned well until the end of the mission. Spacecraft No. 34, a 7K-T ferry, had originally been meant to deliver a crew to the DOS-2 space station after its launch in June 1972, but the station failed to orbit when its Proton rocket malfunctioned. No. 34 remained in storage for more than a year.

After Soyuz 12 had verified the 7K-T ferry on a manned mission, it was decided to fly No. 34 on a two-month mission to simulate the length of an extended Salyut crew residency and prove that Soyuz could handle an extended period of time in space. No. 34, which originally lacked solar panels, was reportedly equipped with them as a means of charging the batteries at the end of the mission.

It was launched November 30, 1973 as Kosmos 613. The official TASS announcement offered little information about its mission, but the orbital parameters quickly proved it to be a Soyuz craft. Once in orbit, Kosmos 613 was powered down to simulate being docked with a Salyut station. The craft was powered back on in the final week of January 1974, reentered, and touched down on January 29. The mission was successful and proved that Soyuz could survive two months in orbit with no ill effects.

== Mission parameters ==
- Spacecraft: Soyuz-7K-T
- Mass: 6800 kg
- Crew: seeds
- Launched: November 30, 1973
- Landed: January 29, 1974

== See also ==
- 1973 in spaceflight
