= Soyuz 13 =

Crewed flight of the Soyuz programme

- Mission type: Astronomy
- Operator: Soviet space program
- COSPAR ID: 1973-103A
- SATCAT no.: 06982
- Mission duration: 7 days 20 hours 55 minutes 35 seconds
- Orbits completed: 127

Spacecraft properties
- Spacecraft: Soyuz 7K-T No.2
- Spacecraft type: Soyuz 7K-T-AF
- Manufacturer: Experimental Design Bureau (OKB-1)
- Launch mass: 6570 kg
- Landing mass: 1200 kg

Crew
- Crew size: 2
- Members: Pyotr Klimuk; Valentin Lebedev
- Callsign: Кавказ (Kavkaz - "Caucasus")

Start of mission
- Launch date: 18 December 1973, 11:55:00 UTC
- Rocket: Soyuz
- Launch site: Baikonur, Site 1/5

End of mission
- Landing date: 26 December 1973, 08:50:35 UTC
- Landing site: 200 km at the southwest of Karaganda, Kazakhstan

Orbital parameters
- Reference system: Geocentric orbit
- Regime: Low Earth orbit
- Perigee altitude: 225.0 km
- Apogee altitude: 272.0 km
- Inclination: 51.60°
- Period: 89.20 minutes
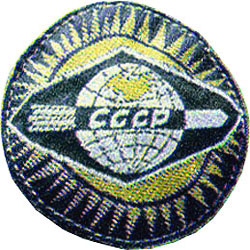
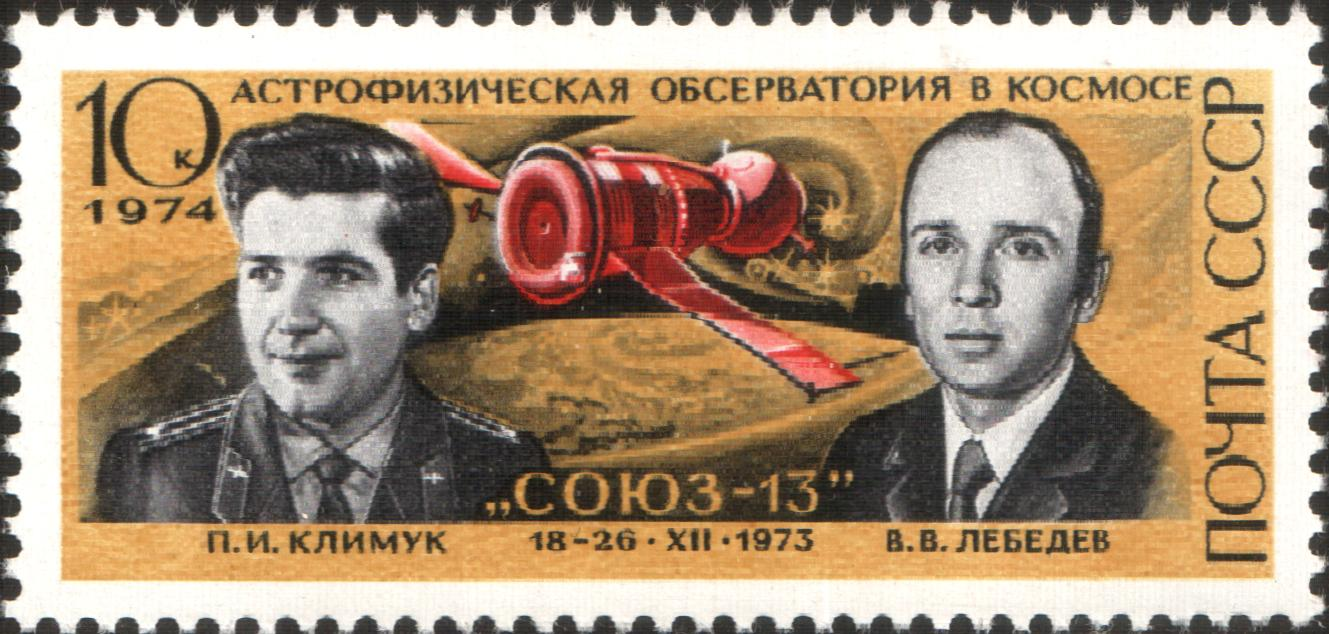
- Vimpel Diamond for entrainment patch A post stamp depicting the crew Soyuz programme

Soyuz 13 (Russian: Союз 13, Union 13) was a December, 1973, Soviet crewed space flight, the second test flight of the redesigned Soyuz 7K-T spacecraft that first flew as Soyuz 12. The spacecraft was specially modified to carry the Orion 2 Space Observatory. The flight, crewed by Pyotr Klimuk and Valentin Lebedev, was the Soviet Union's first dedicated science mission, and was the first mission controlled by the new Kaliningrad Mission Control Center.

== Crew ==
Position	Cosmonaut
Commander	Pyotr Klimuk; First spaceflight
Flight engineer	Valentin Lebedev; First spaceflight

=== Backup crew ===
Position	Cosmonaut
Commander	Lev Vorobiyov
Flight engineer	Valeri Yazdovsky

=== Reserve crew ===
Position	Cosmonaut
Commander	Vladimir Kovalyonok
Flight engineer	Yuri Ponomaryov

== Mission parameters ==
- Mass: 6,570 kg (14,480 lb)
- Perigee: 225.0 km (139.8 mi)
- Apogee: 272.0 km (169.0 mi)
- Inclination: 51.60°
- Period: 89.20 minutes

== Mission highlights ==
Launched 18 December 1973, the Soyuz 13 crew of Klimuk and Lebedev performed some of the experiments intended for the failed Salyut space stations from the previous year. Unlike Soyuz 12, the craft was equipped with solar panels to allow for an extended mission. Additionally, an orbital module was attached replacing unneeded docking equipment. This module included the Orion 2 Space Observatory (see below).

The crew used a multispectral camera to measure the atmosphere and pollution. They also tested the Oasis 2 closed ecology system, and harvested protein, yielding 30 times the original biomass. Medical tests were also carried out, including experiments to measure blood flow to the brain.

The crew landed in a heavy snowstorm on 26 December 1973, but were recovered a few minutes later, some 200 km at southwest of Karaganda, Kazakhstan.

During its 8-day mission, Soyuz 13 was in orbit around the Earth at the same time as the U.S. Skylab 4 mission, which had been launched on 16 November, and which would remain in orbit until 8 February, marking the first time that both the United States and the Soviet Union had crewed missions operating simultaneously.

== Orion 2 Space Observatory ==
The Orion 2 Space Observatory, designed by Grigor Gurzadyan, was operated by crew member Lebedev. Ultraviolet spectrograms of thousands of stars to as faint as 13th magnitude were obtained by a wide-angle meniscus telescope of the Cassegrain system, with an aperture diameter of 240 mm, an equivalent focal length of 1000 mm, and a 4-grade quartz prism objective. The dispersion of the spectrograph was 17, 28 and 55 nm/mm, at wavelengths of 200, 250 and 300 nm respectively. The first satellite Ultraviolet spectrogram of a planetary nebula (IC 2149 in Auriga) was obtained, revealing lines of aluminium and titanium - elements not previously observed in objects of that type. Two-photon emission in that planetary nebula and a remarkable star cluster in Auriga were also discovered. Additionally, comet Kohoutek was observed.

== See also ==
- 1973 in spaceflight
