= Soyuz 7K-T =

Second-generation of the Soyuz spacecraft

- Upgraded Soyuz 7K-T version capable of carrying 2 cosmonauts with the Sokol space suit (after the Soyuz 11 accident).
- Manufacturer: Korolev
- Country of origin: Soviet Union
- Operator: Soviet space program
- Applications: Carry two cosmonauts to orbit and back

Specifications
- Regime: Low Earth orbit

Production
- Status: Out of service
- Launched: 30
- Maiden launch: Kosmos 496, 1972
- Last launch: Soyuz 40, 1981

Related spacecraft
- Derived from: Soyuz 7K-OKS
- Derivatives: Soyuz 7K-TM (ASTP); Soyuz-T (successor)

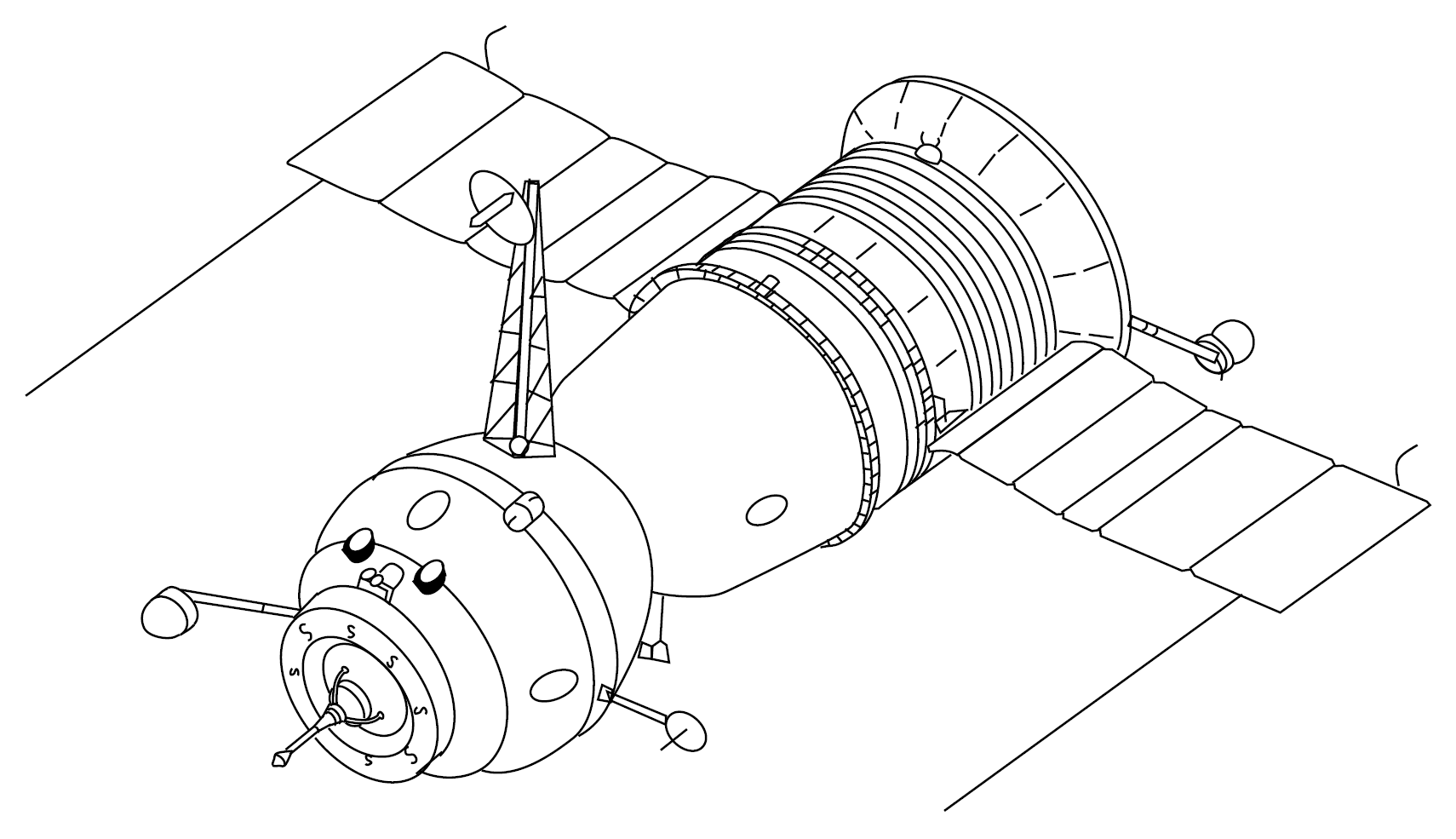
Salyut 1-type Soyuz 7K-T/A9 for 3 cosmonauts without space suits. This was the original Soyuz 7K-OK upgraded for the military Almaz space stations. The "probe-and-drogue" docking system (left) permitted internal transfer of cosmonauts from the Soyuz to the space station.

The second generation of the Soyuz spacecraft, the Soyuz 7K-T, comprised Soyuz 12 through Soyuz 40 (1973–1981).

== History ==
In the wake of the Soyuz 11 tragedy, the spacecraft was redesigned to accommodate two cosmonauts who would wear pressure suits at all times during launch, docking, undocking, and reentry. The place of the third cosmonaut was taken by extra life-support systems. Finally, the 7K-T, being intended purely as a space station ferry, had no solar panels, instead sporting two large whip antennas in their place. As a result, it relied on batteries which only provided enough power for two days of standalone flight. The idea was that the Soyuz would recharge while docked with a Salyut space station, but in the event of a docking or other mission failure (which ended up happening on several occasions), the crew was forced to power off everything except communications and life support systems until they could reenter.

Two test flights of the 7K-T were conducted prior to committing the redesigned Soyuz to a crewed mission. Kosmos 496 was launched on 26 June 1972 and spent a week in space, part of it in powered-down mode. Then on 2 September 1972, an attempted launch of a Zenit reconnaissance satellite failed to orbit due to a malfunction of the vernier engines on the Blok A stage. The existing stock of Soyuz boosters had to be modified to prevent a recurrence of this failure mode on a crewed mission, which delayed the next test until almost a year later when Kosmos 573 launched on 15 June 1973 and spent two days in space. With this done, the way was cleared for the first crewed test, Soyuz 12, in September 1972.

In addition, the standalone flights of Soyuz 13, Soyuz 16, Soyuz 19, and Soyuz 22 used a variant of the 7K-T with solar panels, and in the case of 13 and 22, special camera apparatus in place of the docking mechanism. A large Orion 2 astrophysical camera for imaging the sky and Earth were used on the former and an MKF-6 Zeiss camera on the latter.

Another modification was the Soyuz 7K-T/A9 used for the flights to the military Almaz space station. This featured the ability to remote control the space station and a new parachute system and other still classified and unknown changes.

== Missions ==
- Soyuz 12
- Soyuz 13
- Soyuz 14
- Soyuz 15
- Soyuz 17
- Soyuz 18
- Soyuz 21
- Soyuz 23
- Soyuz 24
- Soyuz 25
- Soyuz 26
- Soyuz 27
- Soyuz 28
- Soyuz 29
- Soyuz 30
- Soyuz 31
- Soyuz 32
- Soyuz 33
- Soyuz 34
- Soyuz 35
- Soyuz 36
- Soyuz 37
- Soyuz 38
- Soyuz 39
- Soyuz 40

== Uncrewed tests ==
- Cosmos 496
- Cosmos 573
- Cosmos 613
- Cosmos 656
- Soyuz 20
