= Soyuz 10 =

1971 Soviet crewed spaceflight to Salyut 1

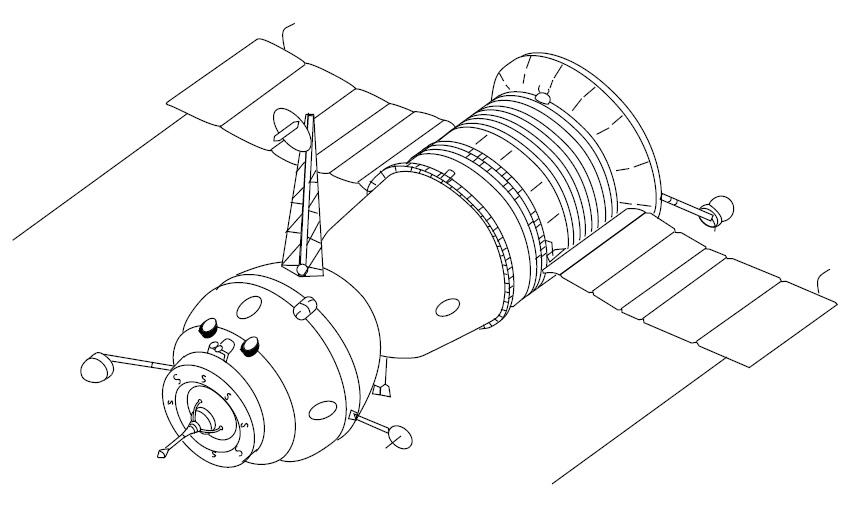
- Mission type: Dock with Salyut 1
- Operator: Soviet space program
- COSPAR ID: 1971-034A
- SATCAT no.: 5172
- Mission duration: 1 day, 23 hours and 46 minutes
- Orbits completed: 32

Spacecraft properties
- Spacecraft: Soyuz 7K-T No. 31
- Spacecraft type: Soyuz 7K-OKS
- Manufacturer: OKB-1
- Launch mass: 6,525 kg (14,385 lb)
- Landing mass: 1,200 kg (2,600 lb)

Crew
- Crew size: 3
- Members: Vladimir Shatalov; Aleksei Yeliseyev; Nikolai Rukavishnikov
- Callsign: Гранит (Granit - "Granite")

Start of mission
- Launch date: 22 April 1971, 23:54:06 GMT
- Rocket: Soyuz 11A511
- Launch site: Baikonur 1/5

End of mission
- Landing date: 24 April 1971, 23:40:00 GMT
- Landing site: 120 km northeast of Karaganda, Kazakhstan

Orbital parameters
- Reference system: Geocentric orbit
- Regime: Low Earth orbit
- Perigee altitude: 208 km (129 mi)
- Apogee altitude: 246 km (153 mi)
- Inclination: 51.6°
- Period: 89.0 minutes
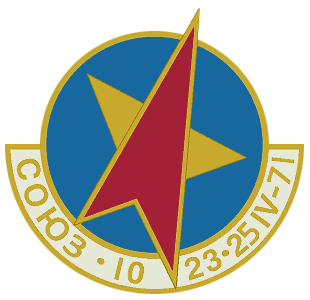
- Soyuz 10 mission patch Soyuz programme

Soyuz 10 (Russian: 'Союз 10', Union 10) was launched on 22 April 1971 as the world's first mission to the world's first space station, the Soviet Salyut 1. The docking was not successful and the crew, Vladimir Shatalov, Aleksei Yeliseyev, and Nikolai Rukavishnikov, returned to Earth without having entered the station. Following difficulties in docking pairs of Soyuz capsules, this would be the first of numerous docking failures in the Soviet space station program.

== Spacecraft ==
The spacecraft was the first of the upgraded Soyuz 7K-OKS, featuring the new "probe and drogue" docking mechanism with internal crew transfer capability, intended for space station visits.

== Mission ==
The cosmonauts Vladimir Shatalov, Aleksei Yeliseyev, and Nikolai Rukavishnikov were able to navigate their Soyuz 10 spacecraft to the Salyut 1 station, yet during docking they ran into problems. The automatic control system failed during approach, owing to a serious design oversight. Soft dock (contact between the spacecraft and station without a full link) was achieved on 24 April 1971 at 01:47 GMT, but the computer sensed an abnormality in the spacecraft's alignment and began firing the attitude control jets to compensate. With Soyuz 10 being pushed to one side by the attitude control system, it became impossible to achieve hard dock, and large quantities of propellant were expended doing so. The docking attempt was called off, but further difficulty occurred when the probe would not come out of the space station's docking cone. The obvious solution was simply to jettison the orbital module and leave it attached to Salyut 1, but this would make it impossible for future Soyuz missions to dock; thus, the space station would have to be abandoned. Eventually, ground controllers realised that the cosmonauts could throw a circuit breaker in the docking mechanism, for interrupting the power supply, which would cause the probe to automatically retract. This procedure worked, and undocking was completed and the capsule returned to Earth later on 24 April 1971 at 23:40 GMT. The automatic control system would be redesigned on future Soyuz spacecraft.

== Crew ==
Position	Cosmonaut
Commander	Vladimir Shatalov; Third and last spaceflight
Flight engineer	Aleksei Yeliseyev; Third and last spaceflight
Systems Engineer	Nikolai Rukavishnikov; First spaceflight

=== Backup crew ===
Position	Cosmonaut
Commander	Alexei Leonov
Flight engineer	Valeri Kubasov
Systems Engineer	Pyotr Kolodin

=== Reserve crew ===
Position	Cosmonaut
Commander	Georgy Dobrovolsky
Flight engineer	Vladislav Volkov
Systems Engineer	Viktor Patsayev

== Mission parameters ==
- Mass: 6,525 kg (14,385 lb)
- Perigee: 208.0 km (129.2 mi)
- Apogee: 246.0 km (152.9 mi)
- Inclination: 51.6°
- Period: 89.0 minutes

== Return ==
Retrorockets were fired at the first opportunity after undocking to permit return to Earth. One last hitch presented itself when toxic fumes began to fill the capsule during reentry, causing Rukavishnikov to pass out; however, all three crew members were recovered unscathed. The landing at 120 km to the northeast of Karaganda, Kazakhstan, the first night-time landing of a crewed spacecraft, was a success.

== See also ==
- Soyuz T-13, a mission to manually dock to the crippled Salyut 7 space station
- Soyuz T-15, a mission to ferry equipment from Salyut 7 to Mir, which had to manually maneuver and dock to Mir
