= MKF-6 (multispectral camera) =

East German Remote sensing device

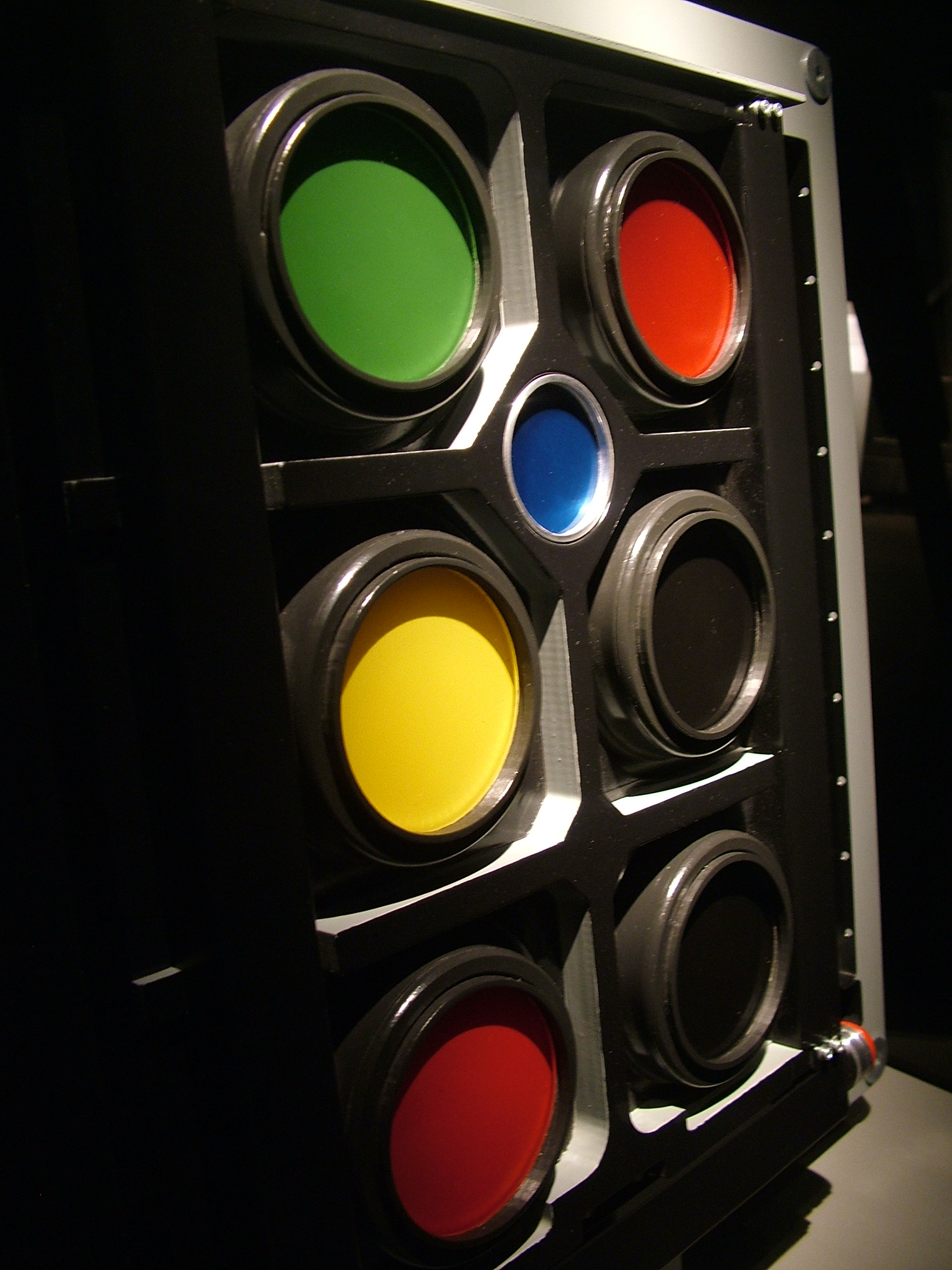
MKF-6 camera lenses

The MKF-6 is a multispectral camera that was designed and made in East Germany for the purpose of remote sensing of the Earth's surface. The device was built by the Kombinat Carl-Zeiss-Jena in cooperation with the Institute for Electronics of the Academy of Sciences of the GDR, where optical elements for the Soviet space program were developed and produced since 1969.

The MKF-6 permits the combined utilization of photogrammetry and spectroscopy. It was first employed on Soyuz 22 in September 1976, on a Soyuz 7K-MF6 and on all subsequent space flights of the USSR and Russia until the end of the space station Mir in 2001. The camera is considered to be a milestone of celestial cartography and pointed the way to the HRSC camera, which was developed by Jena-Optronik GmbH, a former division of the Jenoptik Group of the Carl Zeiss AG, established in 1992 after German reunification.

Because of its suitability for espionage, the MKF-6 was never sold to non-Warsaw Pact states.

== Technical specifications ==
With the MKF-6, terrain sections of around 225 km (140 mi) length and 155 km (96 mi) width, at a flight altitude of 355 km (221 mi) and a resolution of about 10 to 20 m (33 to 66 ft) (in the visible range) were recorded. 70 mm (2.8 in) wide un-perforated films with a length of 110 to 220 m (360 to 720 ft) (depending on the thickness of the film) per lens were used, which provided individual images with a Negative format of 56 by 81 mm (2.2 by 3.2 in). An overlay of 20 to 80% of the images was possible for serial recordings. The total weight of the camera including all its control units doesn't exceed 175 kg (386 lb).

The MKF-6 is equipped with six high-resolution Pinatar 4.5 / 125 mm (focal length) lenses and a rotary shutter, capable to simultaneously take six photos in six different spectral ranges at an exposure time between 1/20 and 1/200 seconds. The color channels range within the wavelengths of 460–500 nm (blue), 520–560 nm (green), 580–620 nm (yellow-orange), 640-680 nm (orange-red), 700-740 nm (red) and 780–860 nm (near infrared).

Films and filters can be variously combined. Nevertheless, all photos of all lenses have to be free of optical distortions and require an identical image scale regardless of their spectral range. In order to acquire the desired quality, the developers of Carl Zeiss Jena created a completely new lens type. Moreover, the camera moves in the flight's direction during exposure to compensate for the carrier satellite's or spacecraft's orbital movement and speed of approximately 20.000 km/h (12.427 mph), which otherwise causes smearing and blurry images.

Manufacture of the lenses was also very complex. Each of the lenses was framed separately and then clamped in a purpose-built lathe. The mounted lenses were centered in such a way that the axis of rotation of the machine and the optical axis of the lenses matched exactly. Thus, the lens frames could be reworked with highest accuracy and then arranged in tubes of precise interior diameter.

Parallel to the MKF-6, a multispectral projector, the MSP-4 was developed. With it, several spectral images, on top of each other and under various filters can be projected on a screen or photographic film. The PKA precision copying machine was designed for image reproduction.

== Operation ==
The geoscientific flight test program, developed by the Central Institute for Earth Physics (Zentralinstitut für Physik der Erde) took place aboard Soviet military aircraft. The MKF-6 was first used in September 1976 on board of Soyuz 22. The spacecraft was modified and equipped with a module that accommodated the camera. A completely revised version of the device, the MKF-6M, that could be remotely operated from the ground was introduced in 1978 and deployed at the Salyut programme of Salyut 6 and 7 and the MIR space station. A total of eleven MKF-6 cameras was produced. Beginning in September 1979 it was also installed in utility/agricultural aircraft, such as the Antonov An-2 for terrestrial surveys and recordings.

== National significance ==
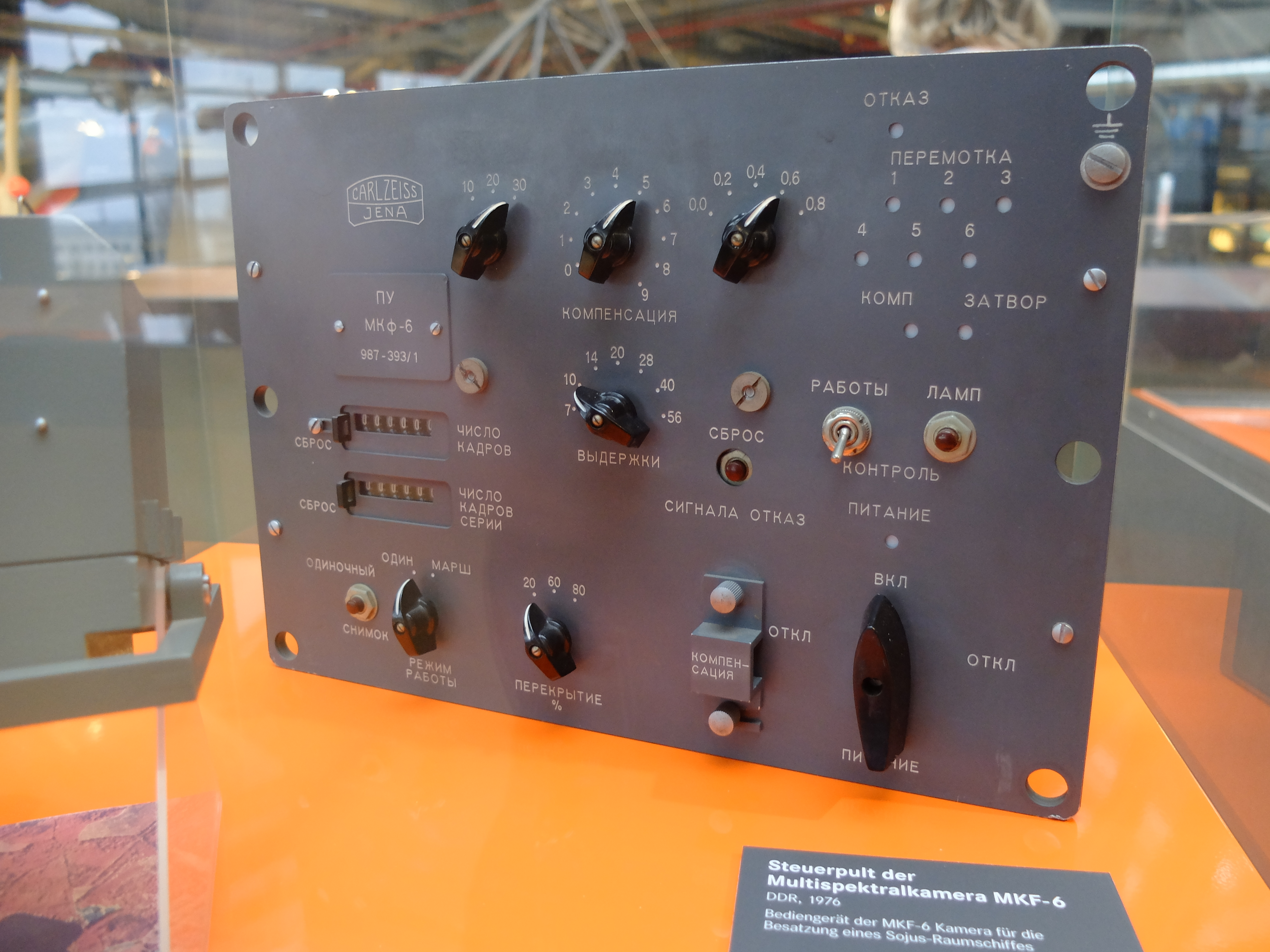
MKF-6 control panel

For the various research institutes of East Germany, the MKF-6 project represented the first steps towards advanced scientific orbital and airborne remote sensing of the earth's surface, the assessment of water and soil quality, military reconnaissance, environmental and meteorological research, among many other fields. Eventually, as a division of the Interkosmos program of the socialist Comecon countries a department for Remote terrestrial sensing was established.

Considered to be the best spectral camera of its time, the development and construction costs of the MKF-6 camera amounted to 82 million East German marks. The MKF-6 is still occasionally being used. Cooperation between the Soviet Union and Carl-Zeiss-Jena for the equipment of satellites and earth terminals began in the mid-1970s. Altogether around 100 devices, developed and produced in East Germany were utilized in space missions of the Interkosmos program and about 150 devices for ground stations.

== Advanced scientific research ==
Achievements and experiences with the MKF-6 were applied to research and data analysis for further missions and the development of new devices.

Fourier-transform infrared spectroscopy was developed and used to study the atmosphere of Venus (Venera 15/16 missions in 1983).

Device development and research participation in the 1986 Vega program (probes Vega 1 and Vega 2 for Venus and Comet Halley), in which all image data of Halley's Comet was recorded, processed and interpreted.

Contributions to the planetary mission Mars 96, with the development of the Wide-Angle Optoelectronic Stereo Scanner (WAOSS).

Participation in the 1988/89 Mars lunar Phobos program, which greatly exceeded GDR involvement in the Vega missions. The Central Institute for Cybernetics and Information Processes (Zentralinstitut für Kybernetik und Informationsprozesse) played a major role in the development of the Fregat Camera Complex. The Phobos mission failed due to premature probe failure as only very little data and images could be acquired, which, however were thoroughly studied and evaluated.
