= Soyuz 22 =

Crewed flight of the Soyuz programme

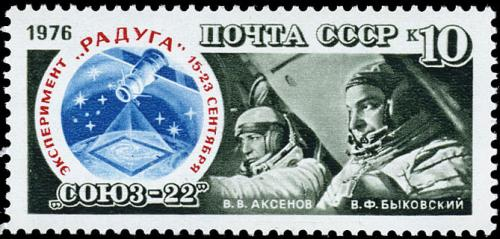
- Cosmonauts and Soyuz 22, on a 1976 Soviet stamp
- Mission type: Earth science mission
- Operator: Soviet space program
- COSPAR ID: 1976-093A
- SATCAT no.: 09421
- Mission duration: 7 days 21 hours 52 minutes 17 seconds
- Orbits completed: 127

Spacecraft properties
- Spacecraft: Soyuz 7K
- Spacecraft type: Soyuz 7K-MF6
- Manufacturer: NPO Energia
- Launch mass: 6570 kg
- Landing mass: 1200 kg

Crew
- Crew size: 2
- Members: Valery Bykovsky; Vladimir Aksyonov
- Callsign: Ястреб (Yastreb - "Hawk")

Start of mission
- Launch date: 15 September 1976, 09:48:30 UTC
- Rocket: Soyuz-U
- Launch site: Baikonur, Site 1/5
- Contractor: NPO Energia

End of mission
- Landing date: 23 September 1976, 07:40:47 UTC
- Landing site: 150 km at the northwest of Tselinograd, Kazakhstan

Orbital parameters
- Reference system: Geocentric
- Regime: Low Earth
- Perigee altitude: 250.0 km
- Apogee altitude: 280.0 km
- Inclination: 64.75°
- Period: 89.6 minutes
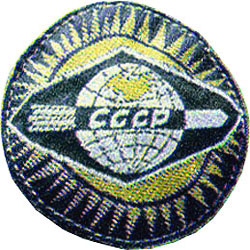
- Vimpel Diamond patch Soyuz programme

Soyuz 22 (Russian: Союз 22, Union 22) was a September 1976, Soviet crewed spaceflight. It was an Earth sciences mission using a modified Soyuz spacecraft, and was also, some observers speculated, a mission to observe NATO exercises near Norway.

The spacecraft was a refurbished Soyuz that had served as a backup for the Apollo-Soyuz Test Project (ASTP) mission the previous year.

Cosmonauts Valery Bykovsky and Vladimir Aksyonov spent a week in orbit photographing the surface of the Earth with a specially-built camera.

== Crew ==
Position	Cosmonaut
Commander	Valery Bykovsky; Second spaceflight
Flight engineer	Vladimir Aksyonov; First spaceflight

=== Backup crew ===
Position	Cosmonaut
Commander	Yury Malyshev
Flight engineer	Gennadi Strekalov

=== Reserve crew ===
Position	Cosmonaut
Commander	Leonid Popov
Flight engineer	Boris Andreyev

== Mission highlights ==
Soyuz 22 was launched to orbit 15 September 1976 at the unusually high inclination of 64.75°, not used since the Voskhod program. The orbiting Salyut 5 space station was at the standard 51.7° inclination, which led some observers to conclude that this solo Soyuz mission was chiefly intended to observe NATO's Exercise Teamwork, taking place in Norway, well above 51.0° latitude and therefore outside good visual range of the space station. However, the particular camera used, an MKF-6 multispectral Carl Zeiss camera which allowed six simultaneous photographs to be taken, suggested to others that reconnaissance, if part of the mission, was a minor part of it. Soyuz 22's orbital inclination maximized ground coverage, especially of the former East Germany. There were two orbit changes within 24 hours of launch. The first came on the fourth orbit and changed the orbit to 250 by 280 km (160 by 170 mi). The second, on the sixteenth orbit, circularized the orbit to 251 by 257 km (156 by 160 mi).

The mission's stated objectives were to "check and improve scientific and technical methods and means of studying geological features of the Earth's surface in the interests of the national economies of the Soviet Union and the German Democratic Republic".

The vehicle was the modified ASTP back-up ship. In place of the APAS-75 androgynous docking system, it carried an East German MKF-6 multispectral camera, built by Carl Zeiss-Jena. One cosmonaut would control the operations of the camera from inside the Orbital module while the second changed the orientation from the Descent module. The camera had six lenses, four visible light and two infrared, which imaged a preselected 165 km (103 mi)-wide strip of the Earth's surface. This allowed over 500,000 km^{2} (190,000 sq mi) to be imaged in 10 minutes.

The first test images from the camera were of Baikal-Amur railway that was being constructed. On the third day of the mission the crew took photographs of Siberia to the sea of Okhotsk in the morning and the northwestern USSR. On the fourth day, the crew imaged the Moon rising and setting to investigate the Earth's atmosphere. This also allowed them to see how clean their spacecraft's windows were. They also imaged Central Asia, Kazakhstan, and Siberia, with attention to geological formations and agricultural effects. The fifth day focused on Azerbaijan, the southern Urals, the Baikal-Amur railway again, and Western Siberia. At the same time a second camera was being flown on an aircraft over the same areas in order to compare the images. The sixth day saw images of Siberia, the Northern USSR, and European USSR which were, according to TASS, areas that had never before been "targets of space photography".

The last full day had the crew focus on East Germany, where an Antonov An-30 aircraft was flying carrying an identical camera to the one aboard Soyuz 22. They also re-photographed Central Asia, Kazakhstan, eastern Siberia, and the southwestern USSR in order to compare images with those taken earlier in the mission. One of the tasks the crew undertook was to dismantle the camera in order to remove its color filters needed to calibrate the images back on Earth. The task took them several hours to complete.

The crew also performed several biological experiments. They ran a small centrifuge in the orbital module to see how plants grew in artificial gravity. They also investigated the effects of cosmic rays on human vision. This effect had first been reported by Apollo astronauts who described bright flashes when they closed their eyes. This was due to cosmic rays passing through the eye. Soyuz 22 also carried a small aquarium so that the crew could watch the behavior of fish.

At the end of the mission, the crew took the film cassettes and other items they were returning to Earth and stowed them in the descent module. The retrofire, re-entry, and landing took place without incident on 23 September 1976. The crew had photographed 30 geographic areas in 2400 photographs. None of the cassettes were found to be faulty and all the images were of good quality. The results, it was said, would aid experts in the fields of agriculture, cartography, mineralogy, and hydrology.

== Mission parameters ==
- Mass: 6,570 kg (14,480 lb)
- Perigee: 250.0 km (155.3 mi)
- Apogee: 280.0 km (174.0 mi)
- Inclination: 64.75°
- Period: 89.6 minutes
