= Kosmos 869 =

Unmanned test flight of the Soyuz 7K-S spacecraft

- Mission type: Orbital test flight
- Operator: Soviet space program
- COSPAR ID: 1976-114A
- SATCAT no.: 9564
- Mission duration: 17 days, 18 hours and 31 minutes

Spacecraft properties
- Spacecraft type: Soyuz 7K-S s/n 3L
- Manufacturer: NPO Energia
- Launch mass: 6,800 kg (15,000 lb)

Start of mission
- Launch date: 29 November 1976, 16:00 GMT
- Rocket: Soyuz-U
- Launch site: Baikonur 1/5

End of mission
- Disposal: Deorbited
- Landing date: 17 December 1976, 10:31 GMT

Orbital parameters
- Reference system: Geocentric
- Perigee altitude: 209 km (130 mi)
- Apogee altitude: 289 km (180 mi)
- Inclination: 51.7°
- Period: 89.4 min

Kosmos 869 (Russian: Космос 869 meaning Cosmos 869) was an uncrewed military Soyuz 7K-S test. It was a somewhat successful mission. This was the third and final test flight of a new Soyuz spacecraft type 7K-S. It was designed to be a spaceship for military solo missions. At the time of the launch the program had already been discontinued. The completed spaceships were launched as uncrewed test flights: Kosmos 670, Kosmos 772 and Kosmos 869. The experience from these flights were used in the development of the successor program Soyuz spacecraft the Soyuz 7K-ST.

== Mission parameters ==
- Spacecraft: Soyuz 7K-S.
- Mass: 6800 kg.
- Crew: None.
- Launched: November 29, 1976.
- Landed: December 17, 1976 10:31 UTC.
- Perigee: 209 km.
- Apogee: 289 km.
- Inclination: 51.7 deg.
- Duration: 17.99 days.

== Maneuver Summary ==
- 196 km X 290 km orbit to 187 km X 335 km orbit. Delta V: 15 m/s.
- 187 km X 335 km orbit to 259 km X 335 km orbit. Delta V: 21 m/s.
- 259 km X 335 km orbit to 260 km X 345 km orbit. Delta V: 2 m/s.
- 260 km X 345 km orbit to 265 km X 368 km orbit. Delta V: 7 m/s.
- 265 km X 368 km orbit to 267 km X 391 km orbit. Delta V: 6 m/s.
- 267 km X 391 km orbit to 300 km X 310 km orbit. Delta V: 32 m/s.

Total Delta V: 83 m/s.

== See also ==
- Cosmos 670
- Cosmos 772
