= Kosmos 670 =

Unmanned test flight of the Soyuz 7K-S spacecraft

- Mission type: Orbital test flight
- Operator: Soviet space program
- COSPAR ID: 1974-061A
- SATCAT no.: 7405
- Mission duration: 2 days, 23 hours and 57 minutes

Spacecraft properties
- Spacecraft type: Soyuz 7K-S s/n 1L
- Manufacturer: NPO Energia
- Launch mass: 6,700 kg (14,800 lb)

Start of mission
- Launch date: 6 August 1974, 00:02 GMT
- Rocket: Soyuz-U
- Launch site: Baikonur 1/5

End of mission
- Disposal: Deorbited
- Landing date: 8 August 1974, 23:59 GMT

Orbital parameters
- Reference system: Geocentric
- Perigee altitude: 211 km (131 mi)
- Apogee altitude: 294 km (183 mi)
- Inclination: 50.6°
- Period: 89.5 min

Kosmos 670 (Russian: Космос 670 meaning Cosmos 670) was an unmanned Soyuz 7K-S test. It used a new and unique inclination of 50.6 degree. The experience from these flights were used in the development of the successor program Soyuz spacecraft the Soyuz 7K-ST.

== Mission parameters ==
- Spacecraft: 7K-S
- Mass: 6700 kg
- Crew: None
- Launched: August 6, 1974
- Landed: August 8, 1974 23:59 UTC.
- Perigee: 221 km
- Apogee: 294 km
- Inclination: 50.6 deg
- Duration: 2.99 days

== See also ==
- Kosmos 772
- Kosmos 869
