= Kosmos 573 =

Soviet uncrewed test of Soyuz

Kosmos 573 (Russian: Космос 573 meaning Cosmos 573) was an unmanned test of the Soyuz without solar arrays in 1973. It did not dock with a space station.The Soviet Union launched two space stations in April-May 1973, both of which failed shortly after reaching orbit. Following the loss of Salyut 2, a military Almaz station, efforts were made to prepare Soyuz Vehicle No. 36 for flight after the second station, a civilian DOS one, would be launched. The DOS station was launched May 11 but soon malfunctioned and was given the cover name Kosmos 557. This left Vehicle No. 36 without a destination. Three Soyuz craft were on hand and had to be used up, but No. 36 was the highest priority since it had already been loaded with propellant. It was decided to launch it on a second test mission to verify the modifications made to Soyuz after the Soyuz 11 tragedy. Additionally, the loss of Kosmos 557 had been caused by a failure of its orientation sensor and Soyuz used a very similar sensor, so it was important to verify its functionality.

The spacecraft was launched as Kosmos 573 on June 15. As with Kosmos 496 a year ago, the Soviet state media offered little information about its mission, although Western observers quickly concluded from the orbital parameters that it was a Soyuz test (the true purpose of Kosmos 573 was revealed in 1985 when the Soviet Union published an atlas of its space program). Kosmos 573 only stayed in orbit two days unlike its predecessor's six days, reentered on June 17, and was recovered successfully. The mission had been completely successful and all spacecraft systems performed well, verifying that Soyuz was safe for a human crew.

== Mission parameters ==
- Spacecraft: Soyuz-7K-T
- Mass: 6,800 kg (15,000 lb)
- Crew: None
- Launched: June 15, 1973
- Landed: June 17, 1973
