= Kosmos 772 =

Unmanned test flight of the Soyuz 7K-S spacecraft

- Mission type: Orbital test flight
- Operator: Soviet space program
- COSPAR ID: 1975-093A
- SATCAT no.: 8338
- Mission duration: 3 days, 23 hours and 55 minutes

Spacecraft properties
- Spacecraft type: Soyuz 7K-S s/n 2L
- Manufacturer: NPO Energia
- Launch mass: 6,750 kg (14,880 lb)

Start of mission
- Launch date: 29 September 1975, 04:15 GMT
- Rocket: Soyuz-U
- Launch site: Baikonur 1/5

End of mission
- Disposal: Deorbited
- Landing date: 3 October 1975, 04:10 GMT

Orbital parameters
- Reference system: Geocentric
- Perigee altitude: 154 km (96 mi)
- Apogee altitude: 245 km (152 mi)
- Inclination: 51.8°
- Period: 88.4 min

Kosmos 772 (Russian: Космос 772 meaning Cosmos 772) was an uncrewed military Soyuz 7K-S test. It was an unsuccessful mission as only one transmitter worked. Only the 166 MHz frequency transmitter operated, all of the other normal Soyuz wavelengths transmitters failed. The experience from these flights were used in the development of the successor program Soyuz spacecraft the Soyuz 7K-ST.

== Mission parameters ==
- Spacecraft: Soyuz 7K-S
- Mass: 6750 kg
- Crew: None
- Launched: September 29, 1975
- Landed: October 3, 1975 4:10 UTC
- Perigee: 154 km
- Apogee: 245 km
- Inclination: 51.8 deg
- Duration: 3.99 days

== Maneuver Summary ==
- 193 km X 270 km orbit to 195 km X 300 km orbit. Delta V: 8 m/s.
- 196 km X 300 km orbit to 196 km X 328 km orbit. Delta V: 8 m/s.

Total Delta V: 16 m/s.

== See also ==
- Cosmos 670
- Cosmos 869
