= Kosmos 656 =

Unmanned test flight of the Soyuz 7K-T spacecraft

- Soyuz 7K-T
- Mission type: Orbital test flight
- Operator: Soviet space program
- COSPAR ID: 1974-036A
- SATCAT no.: 7313
- Mission duration: 2 days, 30 minutes

Spacecraft properties
- Spacecraft: Soyuz 7K-T s/n 69
- Spacecraft type: Soyuz 7K-T/A9
- Manufacturer: NPO Energia
- Launch mass: 6,675 kg (14,716 lb)

Start of mission
- Launch date: 27 May 1974, 07:20 UTC
- Rocket: Soyuz 11A511
- Launch site: Baikonur 1/5

End of mission
- Landing date: 29 May 1974, 07:50 UTC

Orbital parameters
- Reference system: Geocentric
- Regime: Low Earth
- Perigee altitude: 195 km (121 mi)
- Apogee altitude: 364 km (226 mi)
- Inclination: 51.6 degrees
- Period: 90.0 minutes

Kosmos 656 (Russian: Космос 656 meaning Cosmos 656) was an unmanned test of the Soyuz 7K-T, a variant of the Soyuz spacecraft. This Soyuz variant was intended for flights to the Almaz military space stations.

== Mission parameters ==
- Mass: 6,675 kg (14,716 lb)
- Perigee: 195 km (121 mi)
- Apogee: 364 km (226 mi)
- Inclination: 51.6°
- Period: 90.0 minutes
