= Kosmos 496 =

Soviet uncrewed Soyuz test

Kosmos 496 (Russian: Космос 496 meaning Cosmos 496) was an unmanned test of the redesigned Soyuz ferry.After the Soyuz 11 disaster, Soviet space planners considered sending its backup spacecraft, Vehicle No. 33, on an unmanned mission to Salyut 1 to test out pressurization of the spacecraft, but this idea was soon dropped. An extensive redesign effort was made to Soyuz so it would carry two cosmonauts who would wear pressure suits at all times during launch, docking, undocking, and reentry. Some of these modifications were made to Vehicle No. 33. It was also decided to remove the solar panels as a weight-saving measure and use batteries instead. This would only provide two days of power, but that was deemed sufficient for ferrying crews to a space station. Vehicle No. 33 was launched June 26, 1972 under the name Kosmos 496 and so as to not draw any connections with Soyuz 11, the Soviet state media avoided giving any details about the mission, which was not revealed to be a Soyuz test until the glasnost era. Kosmos 496 reentered and landed successfully on July 2--as it was unmanned, the power requirements were lower than if a crew had been aboard and so the mission was able to last six days instead of two.

Mission parameters

- Spacecraft: Soyuz-7K-T
- Mass: 6800 kg
- Crew: None
- Launched: June 26, 1972.
- Launch site: Baikonur.
- Orbit 195 x 343km.
- Inclination 51 degrees.
- Landed: July 2, 1972
