= Soyuz 12 =

Crewed flight of the Soyuz programme

- Mission type: Test flight
- Operator: Soviet space program
- COSPAR ID: 1973-067A
- SATCAT no.: 06836
- Mission duration: 1 day 23 hours 15 minutes 32 seconds
- Orbits completed: 31

Spacecraft properties
- Spacecraft: Soyuz 7K-T No.1
- Spacecraft type: Soyuz 7K-T
- Manufacturer: Experimental Design Bureau (OKB-1)
- Launch mass: 6570 kg
- Landing mass: 1200 kg

Crew
- Crew size: 2
- Members: Vasily Lazarev; Oleg Grigoryevich Makarov
- Callsign: Урал (Ural - "Ural")

Start of mission
- Launch date: 27 September 1973, 12:18:16 UTC
- Rocket: Soyuz
- Launch site: Baikonur, Site 1/5

End of mission
- Landing date: 29 September 1973, 11:33:48 UTC
- Landing site: 400 km at the southwest of Karaganda, Kazakhstan

Orbital parameters
- Reference system: Geocentric orbit
- Regime: Low Earth orbit
- Perigee altitude: 194.0 km
- Apogee altitude: 249.0 km
- Inclination: 51.6°
- Period: 88.6 minutes
- Salyut program insignia Soyuz programme

Soyuz 12 (Russian: Союз 12, Union 12) was a September, 1973, crewed test flight by the Soviet Union of the newly redesigned Soyuz 7K-T spacecraft that was intended to provide greater crew safety in the wake of the Soyuz 11 tragedy. The flight marked the return of the Soviets to crewed space operations after the 1971 accident. The crew capacity of the capsule had been decreased from three to two cosmonauts to allow for pressure suits to be worn during launch, re-entry and docking. It was the first time pressure suits were used for reentry since the Voskhod 2 flight.

Cosmonauts Vasily Lazarev and Oleg Grigoryevich Makarov spent two days in space testing the new craft.

== Crew ==
Position	Cosmonaut
Commander	Vasily Lazarev; First spaceflight
Flight engineer	Oleg Grigoryevich Makarov; First spaceflight

=== Backup crew ===
Position	Cosmonaut
Commander	Aleksei Gubarev
Flight engineer	Georgy Grechko

=== Reserve crew ===
Position	Cosmonaut
Commander	Pyotr Klimuk
Flight engineer	Vitaly Sevastyanov

== Mission parameters ==
- Mass: 6,570 kg (14,480 lb)
- Perigee: 194.0 km (120.5 mi)
- Apogee: 249.0 km (154.7 mi)
- Inclination: 51.6°
- Period: 88.6 minutes

== Mission highlights ==
As the first crewed test of the new version of the Soyuz ferry craft, Soyuz 12, Spacecraft No. 37, was to have flown to the failed Kosmos 557 space station. But the failures of Salyut 2 (4 April 1973) and Cosmos 557 (11 May 1973) in the months previous meant there was no station for the craft to dock to and so it was reconfigured for a short solo flight. The service module had no solar panels, carrying batteries for power instead, which limited the flight to about two days, enough time for a journey to and from a space station.

Cosmonauts Lazarev and Makarov wore pressure suits for launch and landing, and would have worn them for a station docking, all changes brought about by the Soyuz 11 tragedy. The bulk of the suits and their environmental control systems limited the crew size to two. The Soviet news agency TASS, in announcing the launch, explicitly stated that Soyuz 12 was intended to fly a two-day mission, likely so as to prevent speculation that the mission had been aborted prematurely. Published drawings of Soyuz 12 indicated that it had a docking port, confirming its originally intended mission as a space station ferry.

After the successful 27 September 1973 launch, the craft was maneuvered to a 326 x 344 km orbit on the second day in space, which later proved to be the standard orbit for the Salyut 4 space station. Makarov took photographs of the Earth with a handheld multispectral camera while Lazarev used a normal camera. It was reported that the intention of the camera was to survey crop and forest conditions. The cosmonauts also utilised the Molniya 1 satellite to communicate with ground stations when out of range. The crew landed safely on 29 September 1973 and the mission was called "flawless", although this was a half-truth; Soyuz 12 had had a number of problems with its thermal control and attitude orientation systems. A large object was jettisoned when the craft was preparing for retrofire. The object remained in orbit for 116 days.

== See also ==
- 1973 in spaceflight
