= IC 2149 =

Planetary nebula in the constellation Auriga

Emission nebula
- Planetary nebula
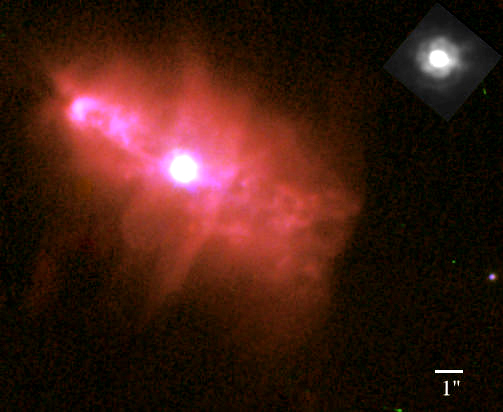
- Near-infrared image of IC 2149

Observation data: J2000.0 epoch
- Right ascension: 05^{h} 56^{m} 23.862^{s}
- Declination: 46° 06′ 17.5″
- Distance: ~1,100 pc, 3,586 ly
- Apparent magnitude (V): 10.6
- Apparent dimensions (V): 12″
- Constellation: Auriga
- Designations: PK 166+10 1, HD 39659, PN G166.1+10.4, PN ARO 23, IRAS 05526+4605, 2MASX J05562386+4606175

IC 2149 is a planetary nebula in the constellation of Auriga. It was discovered in 1906 by Harvard astronomer Williamina Fleming on photographic plates. It is a small, bright planetary nebula with something to offer in telescopes of most sizes.

== Characteristics ==
Visually it has an apparent magnitude of 10.6 and an apparent size of 12 arcseconds and like other objects of its class a nebular filter may help on its observation.

Its distance to the Solar System has been estimated to be around 1.1 kiloparsecs, having a total mass of 0.03 solar masses and being thought to have been produced by a low-mass star.

Some authors have proposed the planetary nebula that the Sun will produce will be similar to this one, but smaller.

The central star of the planetary nebula is an O-type star with a spectral type of O(H)4f.
