= Orion (space telescope) =

Soviet ultraviolet spectrograph series

The Orion space telescopes were a series of two instruments flown aboard Soviet spacecraft during the 1970s to conduct ultraviolet spectroscopy of stars.

== Orion 1 ==
The Orion 1 space astrophysical observatory was installed in the orbital station Salyut 1. It was designed by Grigor Gurzadyan of Byurakan Observatory in Armenia, USSR. It was operated in June 1971 by crew member Viktor Patsayev, who thus became the first man to operate a telescope outside the Earth's atmosphere. Spectrograms of stars Vega and Beta Centauri between wavelengths 2000 and 3800 Å were obtained.

=== Specifications ===
- Ultraviolet telescope
- Optical system: Mersenne
- Spectrograph: Wadsworth
- Diameter of primary mirror: 280 mm
- Focal length: 1400 mm
- Spectral range: 2000–3800 Å
- Spectral resolution at wavelength 2600 Å: 5 Å
- Film: UFSh 4, width 16 mm, range of sensitivity: 4000–2500 Å, resolution better 130 lines/mm
- Cartridge capacity: 12m
- Stabilization: two-stage, inertial
- First stage: three-axis inertial stabilization of station Salyut 1;
- Fine guidance: via a star with accuracy 15 arcsec on each axis.
- Star sensor: of semi-disk (diameter of input: 70 mm; focal length: 450 mm), limiting stellar magnitude 5m.
- Mass: 170 kg

== Orion 2 ==
Orion 2 was installed onboard Soyuz 13 in December 1973, a spacecraft modified to become the first manned space observatory. The observatory was operated by crew member Valentin Lebedev. The designer of the observatory was Grigor Gurzadyan, then at Garni Space Astronomy Laboratory in Armenia. Ultraviolet spectrograms of thousands of stars to as faint as 13th stellar magnitude were obtained by a wide-angle meniscus telescope. The first satellite UV spectrogram of a planetary nebula (IC 2149) was obtained, revealing spectral lines of aluminum and titanium - elements not previously observed in planetary nebula. Two-photon emission in that planetary nebula and a remarkable star cluster in Auriga were also discovered.

=== Specifications ===
- Telescope: meniscus, Cassegrain (-Maksutov) system with an objective prism
- Primary mirror: 300 mm
- Focal length: 1000 mm
- Field of view: 5°
- Registration of spectrograms: film KODAK 103UV, diameter: 110 mm
- Spectral resolution: 8-29 Å at 2000-3000 Å
- Two star sensor sets: each containing a two-coordinate star sensor coaxial to telescope and one-coordinate one, in 45° to telescope axis.
- Two additional sidereal spectrographs.
- Three-axes guidance system accuracy: better than 5 arcsec on two cross-sectional axes of telescope (via star А), and better than 30 arcsec at optical axis (star B)
- Star sensors: input apertures: 80 and 60 mm; focal lengths: 500 and 240 mm; limiting stellar magnitudes: 3.5 and 3.0 m.
- Mass: 240 kg (telescope: 205 kg)
- Mass returned to Earth (cartridges): 4.3 kg
