= Sever (spacecraft) =

Planned crewed spacecraft of the early Soyuz programme

Soyuz Sever (Siber)
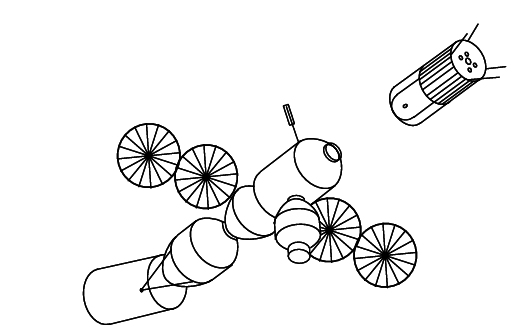
- One of the conceptual drawings of Sever space station (OS-1962) and Sever ferry (early Soyuz) from 1962
- Manufacturer: Experimental Design Bureau (OKB-1)
- Country of origin: Soviet Union
- Operator: Soviet space program
- Applications: Crewed spacecraft

Specifications
- Power: Solar arrays
- Regime: Low Earth orbit (with boosters lunar)

Production
- Status: Design proposals
- Built: 0
- Launched: 0

Related spacecraft
- Derivatives: Soyuz 7K-OK; Soyuz-A Soyuz-B

Soyuz Sever, also spelled Soyuz Siber, (translates to Soyuz north), was an early (1959–1962) design of the Soyuz spacecraft. The Soyuz Sever design of a crewed spacecraft started the Soyuz programme. In 1956, the Soyuz Sever spacecraft was proposed as the replacement for the Vostok spacecraft. Vostok spacecraft had only a crew of one; the Soyuz Sever plan would have crew of three. Sever was planned to be launched on a R7 rocket or Vostok rocket. The Sever plans were made by the Experimental Design Bureau (OKB-1) of the Soviet Union. While the Sever spacecraft was never built and launched, many of the designs and testing outcomes became part of the first generation Soyuz spacecraft, Soyuz 7K-OK and the Soyuz 1 mission launched on 23 April 1967. Sever (Sever ferry) final plan was to take crews to a Sever space station, OS-1962.

== Design ==
On 1 March 1959 the first proposal of OKB-1's engineer, Konstantin Feoktistov was for Sever to be twice as large as the final Soyuz spacecraft. The larger size was so Sever could be part of the Soviet future lunar program, the L4-1960 crewed lunar orbiter proposal. This was changed by August 1959 so Sever would become a small (Soyuz size) three-man spacecraft. In 1961, OKB-1 had several new designs for such a spacecraft: Sever, and competing designs: Sever L1-1960 became crewed obiter Soyuz-A, Soyuz-B (orbital tug), Soyuz-V, and Vostok-Zh (also called Vostok-7 in some sources, not to be confused with the proposed Vostok flight of the same name). One of the Sever designs would use a lifting body for lift off Earth to reduce crew G forces, as The Spaceship Company does and land more like the Space Shuttle. In 1961, Sever was still a part of the future lunar program. Other plans for Soyuz Sever was a crewed orbital space tug version, so spacecraft could be assembled in low earth orbit. This could be used as step to the moon. The assembled craft would have five rocket boosters assembled together to give enough power to go the moon. This plan was not taken up. There are two Sever versions known: one with one solar array and docking end-first, and one with two solar arrays and front-first docking (both requiring EVA to transfer crew). In 1961 Konstantin Vershinin, commander-in-chief of the Soviet Air Force, setup new requirements for the next generation spacecraft: crew of 2 cosmonauts, launch mass of 5896 to 6350 kg, able to manoeuvre at altitudes of 270 km to 300 km, restartable engines, 15 to 20 days duration, redundant communication radios, in a pressurized re-entry space capsule. Soviet engineer, Vladimir Chelomey, was still pushing for the lifting body spaceplane, but his plan was rejected. On 10 February 1962 a mockup-prototype of the Sever spacecraft with two crew members was completed and a 15-day test was started. The test was planned and led by chief spacecraft designer, Grigoriy Ivanovich Voronin at GKNII in Akhtubinsk. The 1962 proposal included L1-1962, a crewed lunar flyby spacecraft. Some of the 1962 L1-1962 proposal became part of the Soyuz spacecraft.

== Designated Sever proposals ==
Some of the Sever proposals were formalized and given designated projects numbers:

- L1-1960 Sever crewed circumlunar spacecraft proposal from 1960. This became the Soyuz-A design. L1-1960 was proposed by Sergei Korolev in January 1960. The L1-1960 was a planned three crewed 5,000 to 6,000 kg spacecraft that would loop around the moon and then back to earth in 1964, first achieved with crew by Apollo 8's lunar orbit in 1968. The L1-1960 would use the N1 rocket that had started planning in May 1961 but had not started development until October 1965.
- L4-1960 Sever crewed lunar orbiter proposal from 1960 with a gross mass of 12,000 kg, proposed by Korolev in January 1960. The L4-1960 lunar orbiter would be two times the size of the L1-1960. The L4-1960 would also use the N1 rocket. The L4-1960 would have had a payload of 6,000 to 8,000 kg.
- L1-1962 Sever crewed lunar flyby spacecraft proposal from 1962 with a gross mass of 16,500 kg. The L1-1962 was planned to use a Vostok-Zh (or Vostok-7, a modernized Vostok 3KA) spacecraft as a manned space tug piloted by a 'cosmonaut assemblyman' to assemble a three-stage circumlunar complex in earth orbit via in-orbit rendezvous with each component launched by multiple R-7 derived rockets. Following the assembly of the lunar complex in earth orbit, the Vostok-Zh spacecraft would return to earth and a separately launched Soyuz L1 (later developing into the Soyuz 7K-L1) spacecraft with a crew of one to three cosmonauts would dock with the lunar complex and travel to the moon, each stage firing in sequence for translunar injection. The Vostok-Zh spacecraft was also planned to be used to assemble the three-part Sever earth observatory, OS-1962, with the Vostok-Zh to be the ferry craft to take crews to and from the spacestation.

== OS-1962 space station ==
Part of the Soviet space station Sever project was the planning of a crewed space station, the OS-1962 design plan (Orbital Station 1962). Korolev approved the OS-1962 project called the "Complex docking of spacecraft in earth orbit - Soyuz" on 10 March 1962. The plan also included the L1-1960, circumlunar spacecraft proposal project. The OS-1962 space station plan called for station with a gross mass of 13,500 kg. The OS-1962 plan first had the large spacecraft, which was later reduced by half. The space station was to be placed in orbit with three R-7 rocket launches and a Vostok-Zh (Vostok-7) spacecraft. OS-1962 was to be a platform for earth observation. The OS-1962 space station would have ZhO living section, the BAA scientific apparatus block, and the Sever (Soyuz) spacecraft docked to the space station. The OS-1962 station had four solar arrays for power. While OS-1962 was not built some of its designs were used in later space stations. The OP space station (1962), OS-1 space station (1965), Soyuz R space station (1966) and MKBS space station (1974) also were not built. Salyut 1 later became the Soviet Union's first space station in 1971.

== Gallery ==
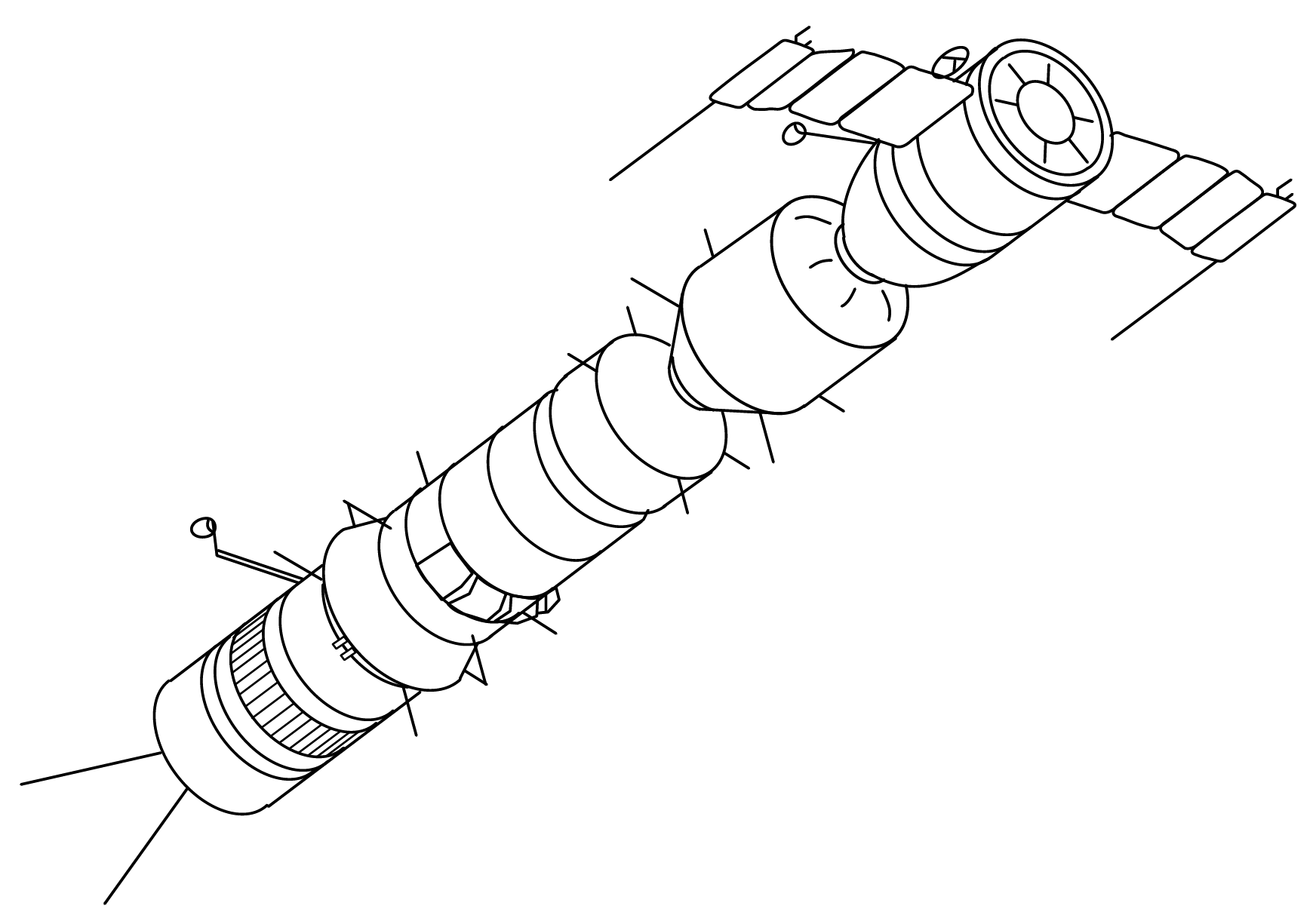
L1-1960 Sever was developed into the Soyuz-A and Soyuz-B design the Soyuz 7K-9K-11K circumlunar concept. The drawing shows Soyuz 7K (right), Soyuz 9K booster, and Soyuz 11K tanker with twin whip antennas (left).

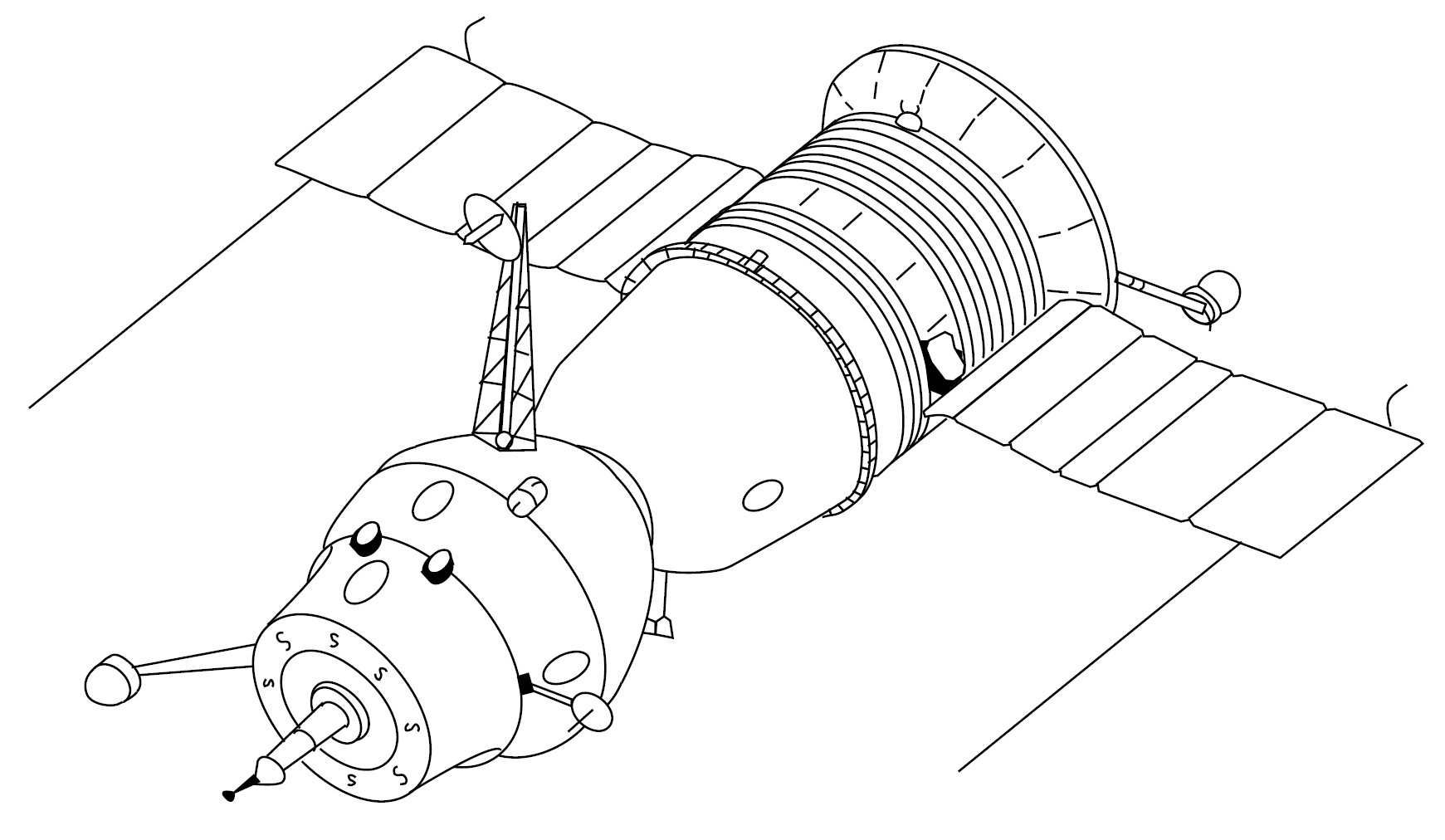
Soyuz 7K-OK(A), first working Soyuz, that used many Sever designs. First Soyuz 7K-OK was launched on 23 April 1967.

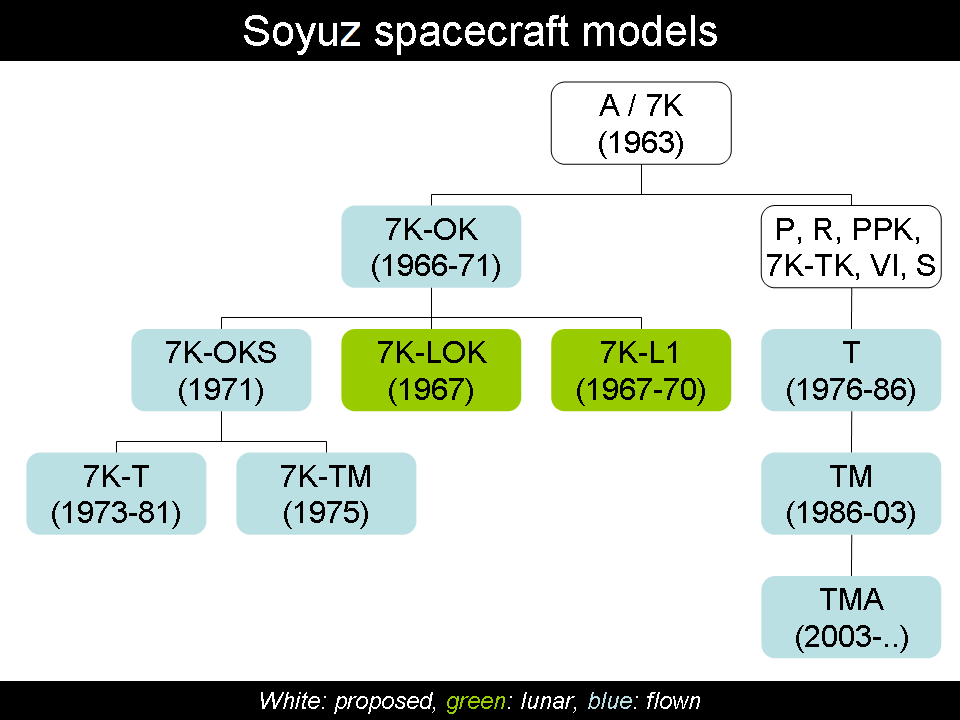
Soyuz family tree, Sever would be at the very top above A / 7K, as A / 7K came from the Sever project

== See also ==
- List of space stations
- Soviet crewed lunar programs
- Comparison of crewed space vehicles
- Soyuz 7K-LOK
