= Soyuz-V =

Proposed Soviet spacecraft

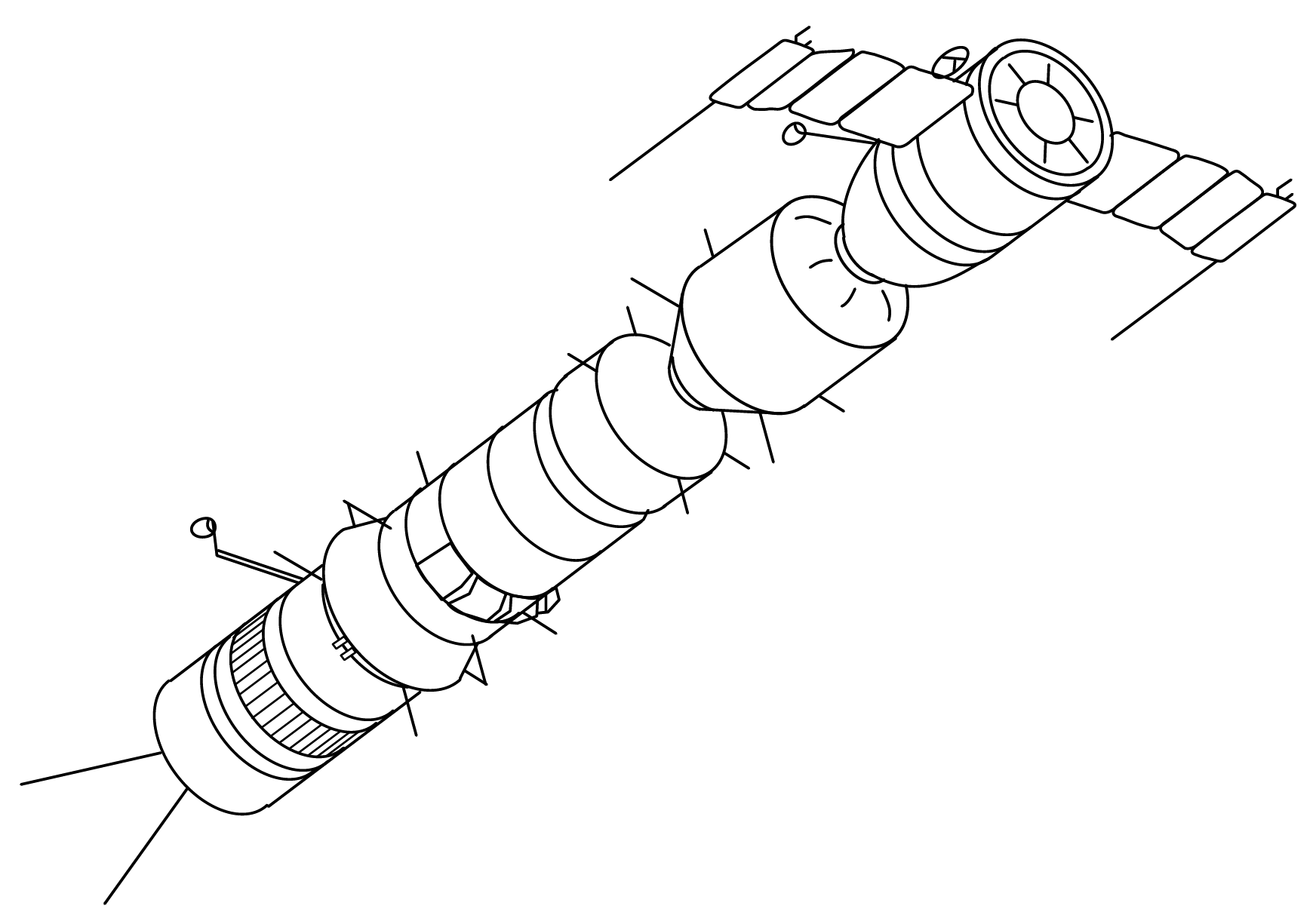
- Soyuz 11K (left) docked with Soyuz 9K and Soyuz 7K
- Manufacturer: OKB-1
- Country of origin: Soviet Union
- Applications: Fuel tanker

Specifications
- Regime: Low Earth

Production
- Status: Cancelled in 1964
- Launched: None

Soyuz-V (Russian: Союз-В meaning Union-V) or Soyuz 11K (Russian: Союз 11К), sometimes known in the west as Soyuz-C, was a proposed Soviet spacecraft, which was designed for use as a fuel tanker. It would have been used to refuel other spacecraft, particularly the Soyuz 9K orbital tug. It was part of the Soyuz A-B-V complex for human circumlunar spaceflight.

The Soyuz 11K was intended to have been launched into low Earth orbit by the Soyuz 11A511 carrier rocket. Following launch, it would have docked with the NO docking module of a waiting Soyuz 9K, and transferred over 7,000 kilograms (15,000 lb) of fuel into the tug. Up to three Soyuz 11K tankers would have been launched per Soyuz 9K, each one carrying either propellant or oxidiser. The Soyuz 9K would then have been used to boost a crewed Soyuz 7K or Soyuz 7K-P spacecraft into a higher orbit; the Soyuz 7K onto a circumlunar trajectory for human Lunar exploration, and the Soyuz 7K-P into a higher orbit to intercept and destroy another spacecraft. The Soyuz 11K, along with the NO module of the Soyuz 9K, would have been jettisoned before the Soyuz 9K performed its burn.

Following the cancellation in 1964 of both the Soyuz 7K and Soyuz 7K-P programmes; the former in favour of the LK-1 spacecraft, and the latter in favour of uncrewed antisatellite programmes, the Soyuz 9K and Soyuz 11K were no longer required, and they too were cancelled.

== See also ==
- Soyuz 7K
- Soyuz 9K
- Soyuz 7K-P
- Soyuz programme
- Soyuz (spacecraft)
- Progress (spacecraft)
