= Soyuz-A =

Soviet spacecraft design

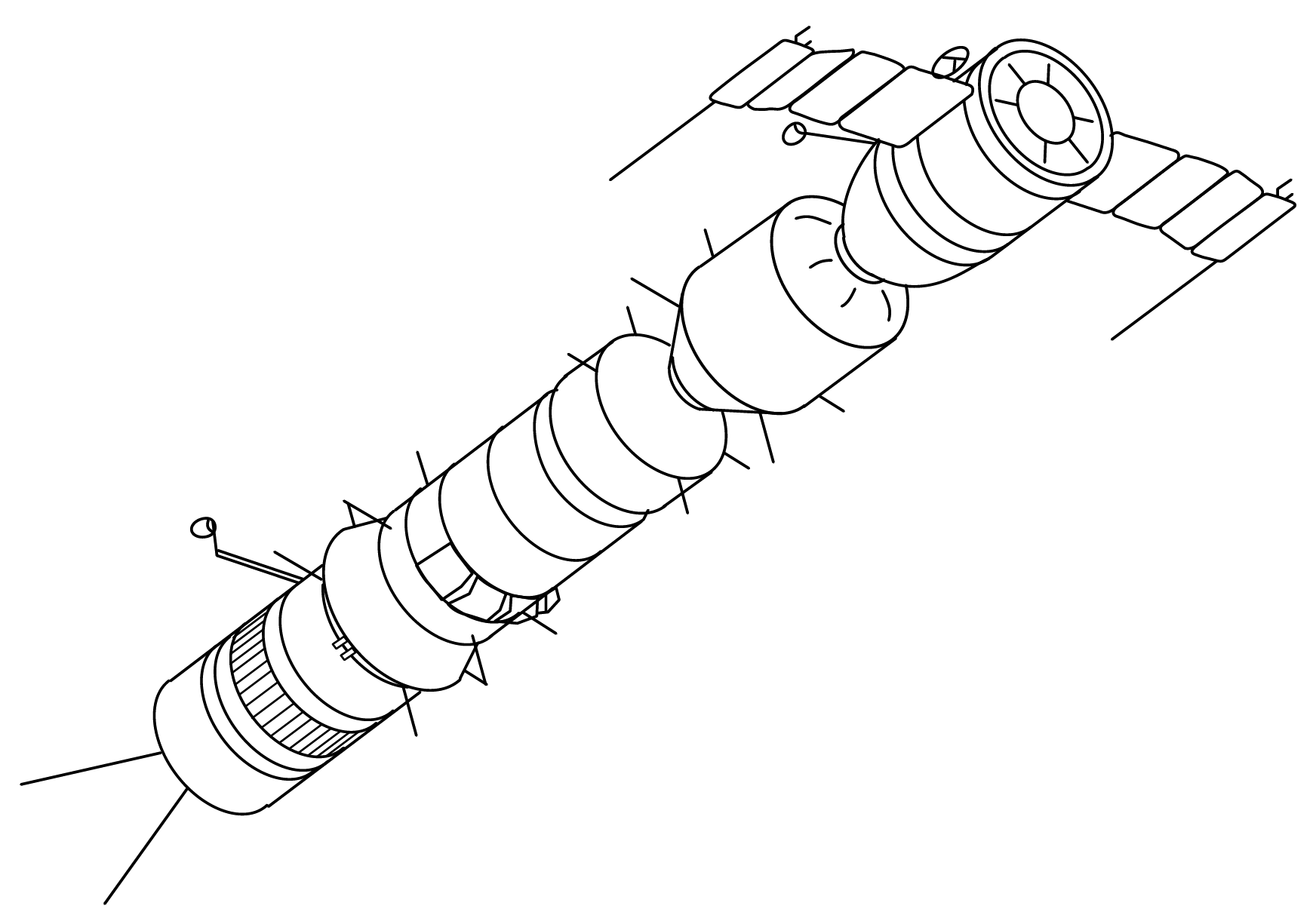
- Soyuz 7K-9K-11K circumlunar concept. The drawing shows Soyuz 7K (right), Soyuz 9K booster, and Soyuz 11K tanker with twin whip antennas (left)
- Manufacturer: OKB-1
- Country of origin: Soviet Union
- Applications: Carry up to three cosmonauts to lunar orbit.

Specifications
- Regime: Low Earth; Medium Earth; Circumlunar

Production
- Status: Cancelled
- Launched: None

Related spacecraft
- Derivatives: Soyuz 7K-OK (first Soyuz generation to fly crewed)

Sergei Korolev initially promoted the Soyuz A-B-V circumlunar complex (7K-9K-11K) concept (also known as L1) in which a two-man craft Soyuz 7K would rendezvous with other components (9K and 11K) in Earth orbit to assemble a lunar excursion vehicle, the components being delivered by the proven R-7 rocket.

Besides the Soyuz 7K spacecraft, the complex would feature a Soyuz 9K booster and a Soyuz 11K tanker with twin whip antennas.

The 7K would have been equipped with cameras and sensors to study the lunar surface during the flyby, at a distance of 1,000 to 20,000 km from the Moon's surface. Total flight time would have been 7 to 8 days.

== Relation with other Soyuz versions ==
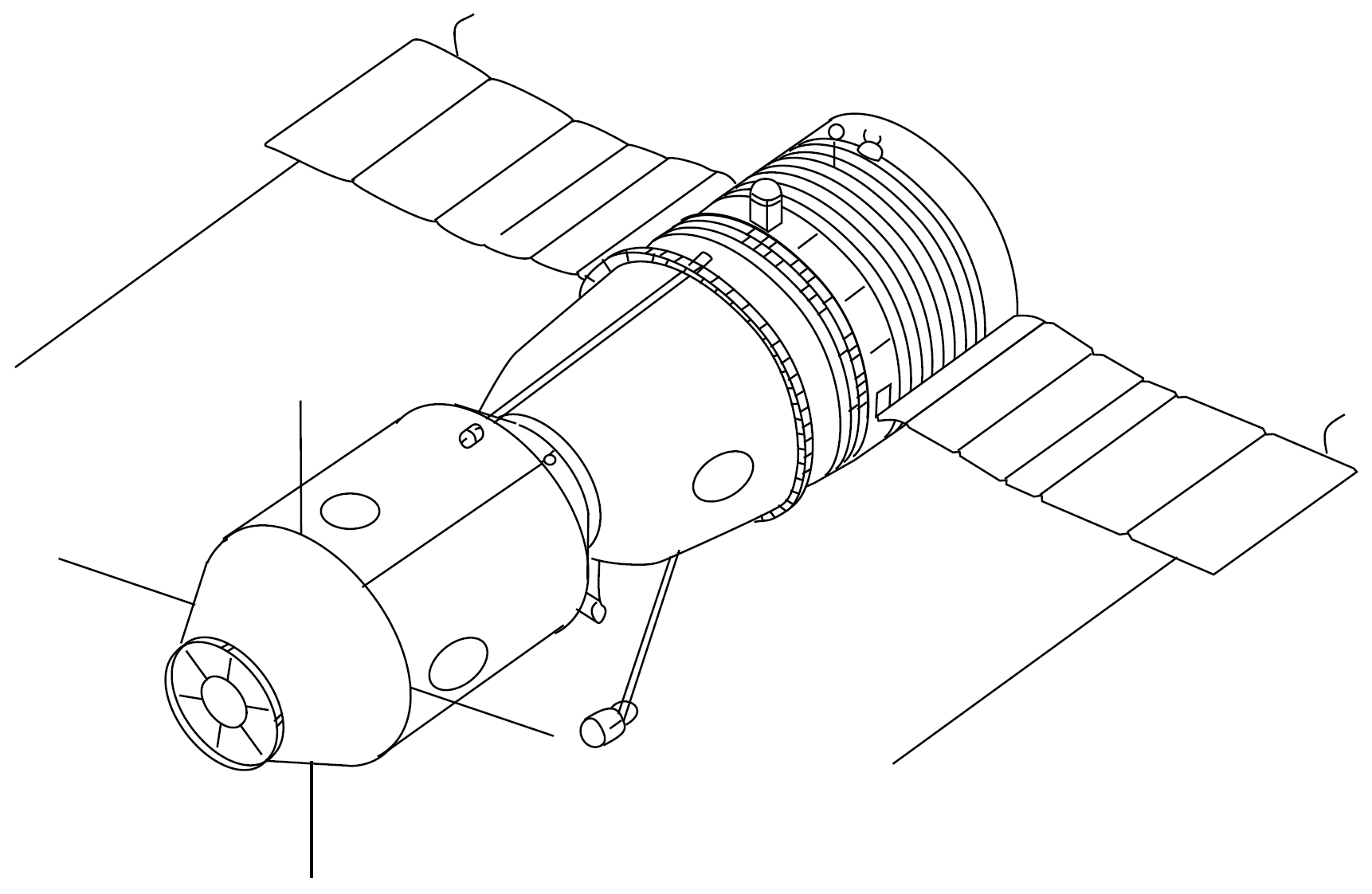
Soyuz 7K manned spacecraft concept (1963)

Soyuz A is the base concept for the entire Soyuz spacecraft family. The 7K series is a direct descendant of this original proposal. The list below shows proposed, flown (in bold) and military (in italic) Soyuz versions.

- Soyuz-A (1963)
  - Soyuz P (1962)
    - Soyuz PPK (1964)
  - Soyuz R (1962)
    - Soyuz 7K-TK (1966)
  - Soyuz 7K-VI Zvezda (1964)
  - Soyuz OIS (1967)
    - Soyuz OB-VI (1967)
    - Soyuz 7K-S (1974)
    - Soyuz 7K-ST (1974)
      - **Soyuz T** (1976–86)
        - **Soyuz TM** (1986–02)
        - **Soyuz TMA** (2002–12)
        - **Soyuz TMA-M** (2010–16)
        - **Soyuz MS** (2016-...)
      - **Progress M** (1989–09)
      - **Progress M1** (2000–14)
      - **Progress MS** (2015)
  - **Soyuz 7K-LOK** (1967)
    - **Soyuz 7K-L1** (1967–70)
      - **Soyuz 7K-L1E** (1970–71)
  - **Soyuz 7K-OK** (1967–71)
    - **Soyuz 7K-OKS** (1971)
      - **Soyuz 7K-T** (1973–81)
        - **Progress 7K-TG** (1978–90)
      - **Soyuz 7K-TM** (1975)

== See also ==
- Soyuz 9K
- Soyuz 11K
- Soyuz programme
- Soyuz (spacecraft)
- Progress (spacecraft)
