= Soyuz (spacecraft) =

Series of spacecraft designed for the Soviet space programme

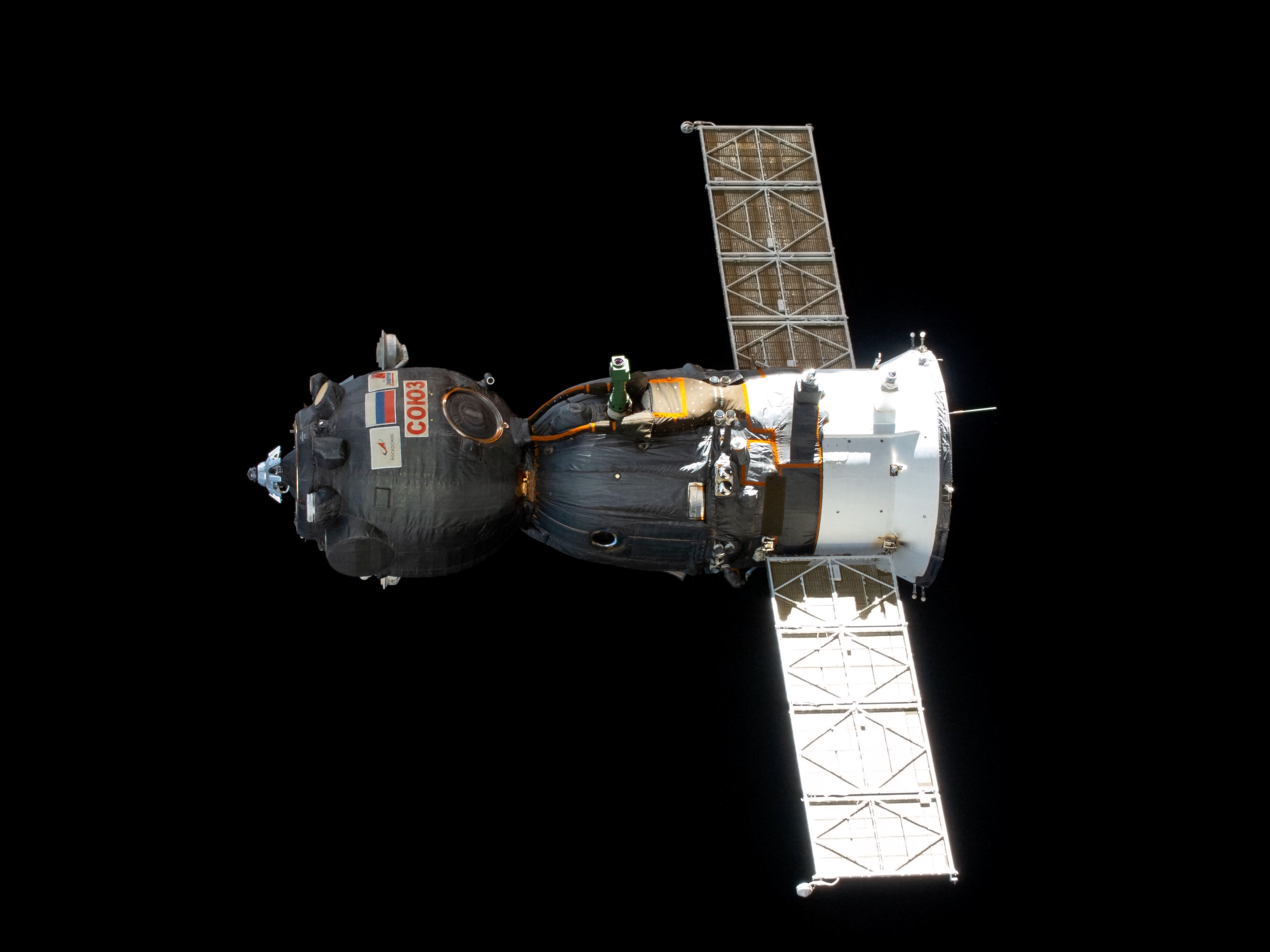
- Soyuz MS, the latest version of the spacecraft
- Manufacturer: Energia
- Country of origin: Soviet Union, Russia
- Operator: Soviet space program (1967–1991); Roscosmos (1992–present)
- Applications: Carry cosmonauts to orbit and back (originally for Soviet Moonshot and Salyut and Mir space station transportation)

Specifications
- Crew capacity: 3
- Regime: Low Earth orbit, Medium Earth orbit (circumlunar spaceflight during early program)
- Design life: Up to 6 months (docked to International Space Station)

Production
- Status: In service
- Maiden launch: Kosmos 133: 28 November 1966 (uncrewed); Soyuz 1: 23 April 1967 (crewed)
- Last launch: Latest launch: Soyuz MS-29 14 July 2026 (crewed)

Related spacecraft
- Derivatives: Shenzhou, Progress

Soyuz (Russian: Союз, IPA: [sɐˈjus], lit. 'Union') is a series of spacecraft which has been in service since the 1960s, having made more than 140 flights. It was designed for the Soviet space program by the Korolev Design Bureau (now Energia). The Soyuz succeeded the Voskhod spacecraft and was originally built as part of the Soviet crewed lunar programs. It is launched atop the similarly named Soyuz rocket from the Baikonur Cosmodrome in Kazakhstan.

Following the Soviet Union's dissolution, Roscosmos, the Russian space agency, continued to develop and use the Soyuz. Between the Space Shuttle's 2011 retirement and the SpaceX Crew Dragon's 2020 debut, Soyuz was the sole means of crewed transportation to and from the International Space Station, a role it continues to fulfill. The Soyuz design has also influenced other spacecraft, including China's Shenzhou and Russia's Progress cargo vehicle.

The Soyuz is a single-use spacecraft composed of three main sections. The descent module is where cosmonauts are seated for launch and reentry. The orbital module provides additional living space and storage during orbit but is jettisoned before reentry. The service module, responsible for propulsion and power, is also discarded prior to reentry. For added safety and aerodynamics, the spacecraft is encased within a fairing with a launch escape system during liftoff.

== History ==
The first Soyuz mission, Kosmos 133, launched unmanned on 28 November 1966. The first crewed Soyuz mission, Soyuz 1, launched on 23 April 1967 but ended tragically on 24 April 1967 when the parachute failed to deploy on reentry, killing cosmonaut Vladimir Komarov. The following flight, Soyuz 2 was uncrewed. Soyuz 3 launched on 26 October 1968 and became the program's first successful crewed mission. The program suffered another fatal setback during Soyuz 11, where cabin depressurization during reentry killed the entire crew. These are the only humans to date who are known to have died above the Kármán line, the conventional definition of the edge of space.

Despite these early tragedies, Soyuz has earned a reputation as one of the safest and most cost-effective human spaceflight vehicles, a legacy built upon its unparalleled operational history. The spacecraft has served as the primary mode of transport for cosmonauts to and from the Salyut space stations, the Mir space station, and International Space Station (ISS).

== Design ==
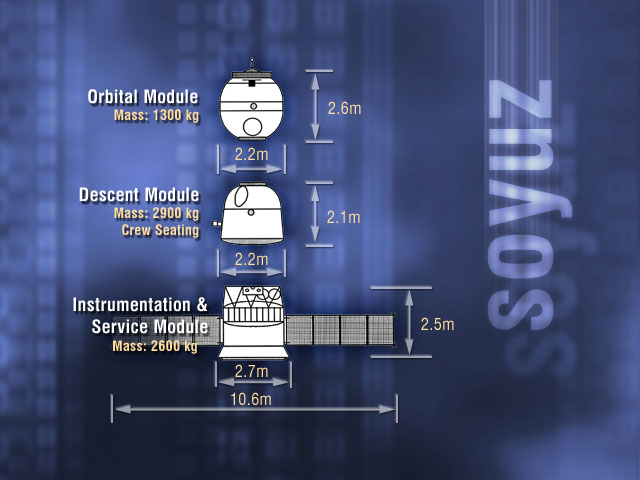
Exploded-view drawing of the modules of the Soyuz spacecraft

Currently operational crewed spacecraft (at least orbital class)

Soyuz spacecraft are composed of three primary sections (from top to bottom, when standing on the launch pad):

- Orbital module: A spheroid compartment providing living space for the crew.
- Descent module: A small, aerodynamic capsule where the crew is seated for launch and return the crew to Earth.
- Service module: A cylindrical section housing propulsion, power, and other systems.

The orbital and service modules are discarded and destroyed upon reentry. This design choice, while seemingly wasteful, reduces the spacecraft's weight by minimizing the amount of heat shielding required. As a result, Soyuz offers more habitable interior space (7.5 cubic metres, 260 cubic feet) compared to its Apollo counterpart (6.3 m^{3}, 220 cu ft). While the reentry module does return to Earth, it is not reusable. A new Soyuz spacecraft is made for each mission.

Soyuz can carry up to three crew members and provide life support for about 30 person-days.

A payload fairing protects Soyuz during launch and is jettisoned early in flight. Equipped with an automated docking system, the spacecraft can operate autonomously or under manual control.

=== Launch escape system ===
The Vostok spacecraft used an ejector seat to bail out the cosmonaut in the event of a low-altitude launch failure, as well as during reentry; however, it would probably have been ineffective in the first 20 seconds after liftoff, when the altitude would be too low for the parachute to deploy. Inspired by the Mercury LES, Soviet designers began work on a similar system in 1962. This included developing a complex sensing system to monitor various launch-vehicle parameters and trigger an abort if a booster malfunction occurred. Based on data from R-7 launches over the years, engineers developed a list of the most likely failure modes for the vehicle and could narrow down abort conditions to premature separation of a strap-on booster, low engine thrust, loss of combustion-chamber pressure, or loss of booster guidance. The spacecraft abort system (SAS; Russian: Система Аварийного Спасения, romanized: Sistema Avariynogo Spaseniya) could also be manually activated from the ground, but unlike American spacecraft, there was no way for the cosmonauts to trigger it themselves.

Since it turned out to be almost impossible to separate the entire payload shroud from the Soyuz service module cleanly, the decision was made to have the shroud split between the service module and descent module during an abort. Four folding stabilizers were added to improve aerodynamic stability during ascent. Two test runs of the SAS were carried out in 1966–1967.

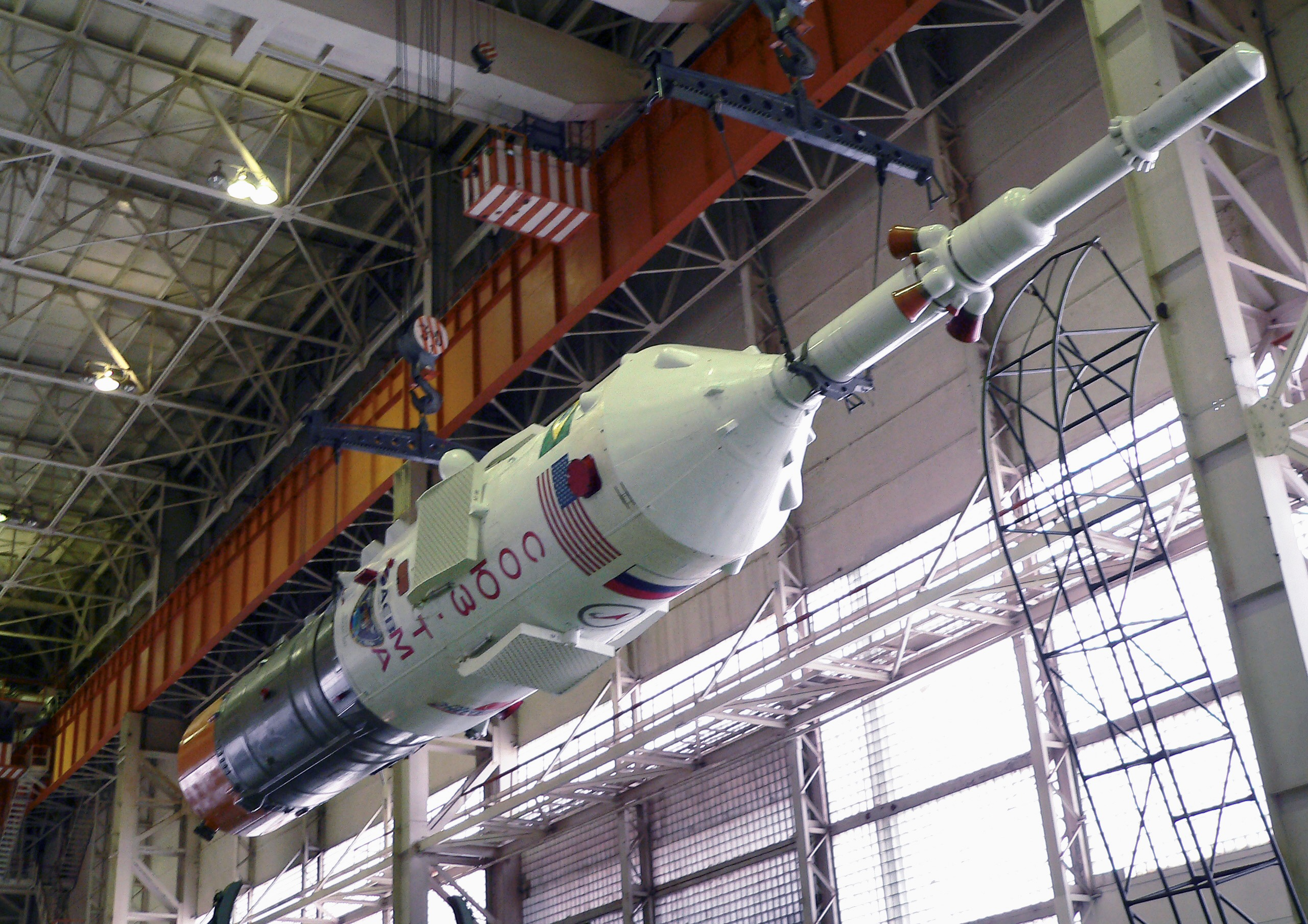
The capsule and escape system of the Soyuz TMA-8 mission during assembly

The basic design of the SAS has remained almost unchanged in 50 years of use, and all Soyuz launches carry it. The only modification was in 1972, when the aerodynamic fairing over the SAS motor nozzles was removed for weight-saving reasons, as the redesigned Soyuz 7K-T spacecraft carried extra life-support equipment. The uncrewed Progress resupply ferry has a dummy escape tower and removes the stabilizer fins from the payload shroud. There have been three failed launches of a crewed Soyuz vehicle: Soyuz 18a in 1975, Soyuz T-10a in 1983 and Soyuz MS-10 in October 2018. The 1975 failure was aborted after escape-tower jettison. In 1983, Soyuz T-10a's SAS successfully rescued the cosmonauts from an on-pad fire and explosion of the launch vehicle. Most recently, in 2018, the SAS sub-system in the payload shroud of Soyuz MS-10 successfully rescued the cosmonauts from a rocket failure 2 minutes and 45 seconds after liftoff, after the escape tower had already been jettisoned.

=== Orbital module ===
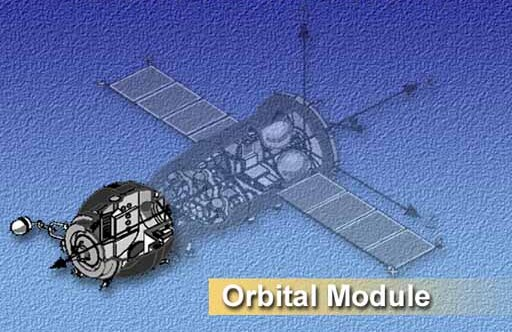
Drawing highlighting the orbital module

The forepart of the spacecraft is the orbital module (Russian: бытовой отсек, romanized: bytovoi otsek), also known as habitation section. It houses all the equipment that will not be needed for reentry, such as experiments, cameras or cargo. The module also contains a toilet, docking avionics and communications gear. Internal volume is 6 m^{3} (210 cu ft), living space is 5 m^{3} (180 cu ft). On later Soyuz versions (since Soyuz TM), a small window was introduced, providing the crew with a forward view.

A hatch between it and the descent module can be closed so as to isolate it to act as an airlock if needed so that crew members could also exit through its side port (near the descent module). On the launch pad, the crew enter the spacecraft through this port. This separation also lets the orbital module be customized to the mission with less risk to the life-critical descent module. The convention of orientation in a micro-g environment differs from that of the descent module, as crew members stand or sit with their heads to the docking port. Also the rescue of the crew whilst on the launch pad or with the SAS system is complicated because of the orbital module.

Separation of the orbital module is critical for a safe landing; without separation of the orbital module, it is not possible for the crew to survive landing in the descent module. This is because the orbital module would interfere with proper deployment of the descent module's parachutes, and the extra mass exceeds the capability of the main parachute and braking engines to provide a safe soft-landing speed. In view of this, the orbital module was separated before the ignition of the return engine until the late 1980s. This guaranteed that the descent module and orbital module would be separated before the descent module was placed in a reentry trajectory. However, after the problematic landing of Soyuz TM-5 in September 1988 this procedure was changed, and the orbital module is now separated after the return maneuver. This change was made as the TM-5 crew could not deorbit for 24 hours after they jettisoned their orbital module, which contained their sanitation facilities and the docking collar needed to attach to Mir. The risk of not being able to separate the orbital module is effectively judged to be less than the risk of needing the facilities in it, including the toilet, following a failed deorbit.

=== Descent module ===
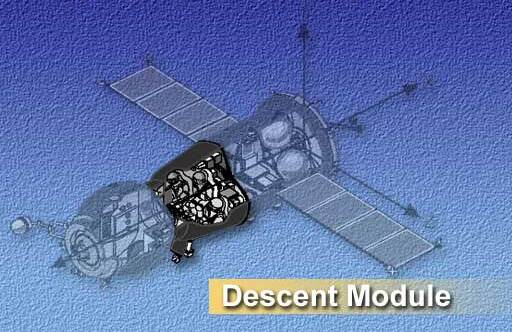
Drawing highlighting the descent module

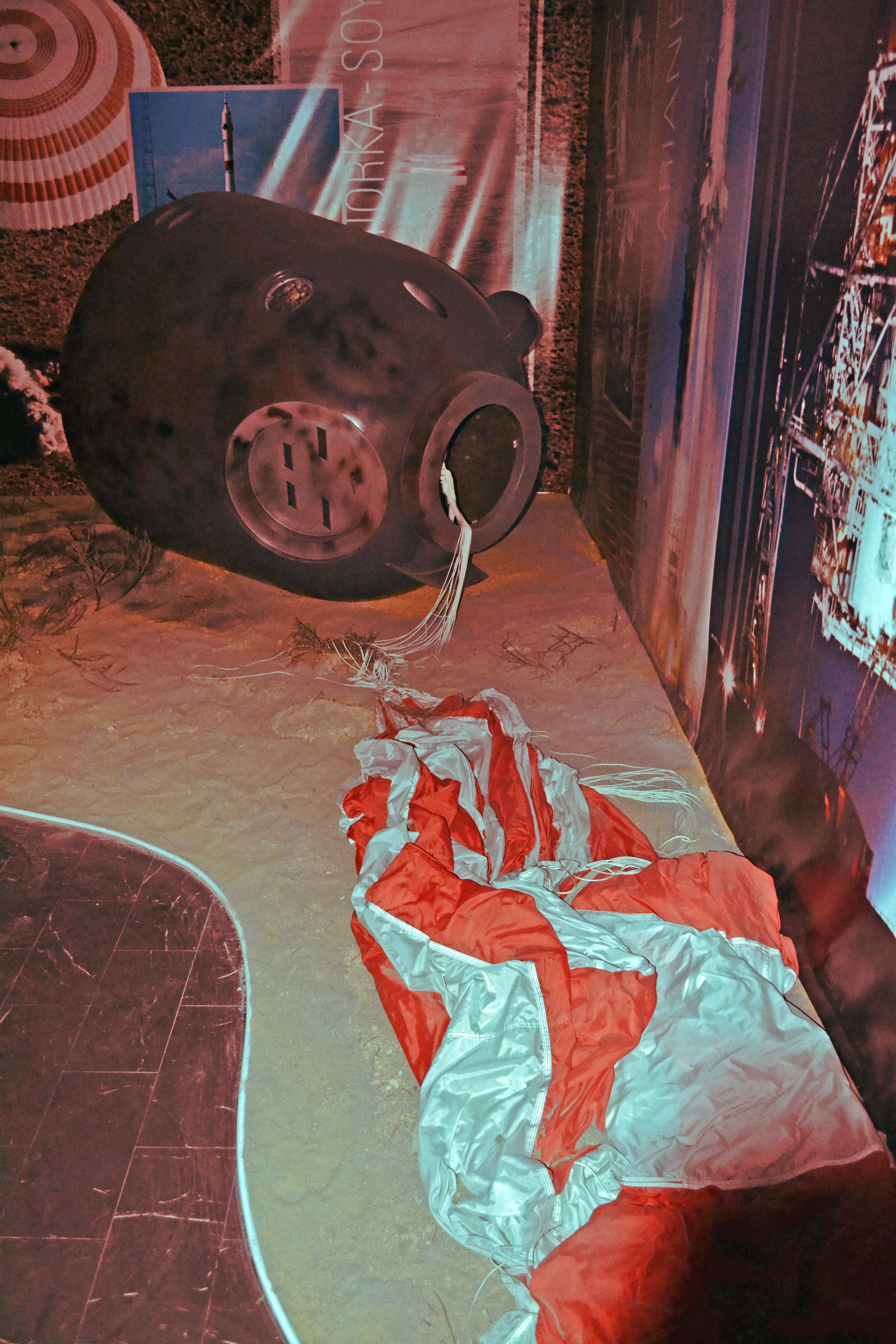
Replica of the Soyuz spacecraft's reentry module at the Euro Space Center in Belgium

The descent module (Russian: Спуска́емый Аппара́т, romanized: spuskáyemy apparát), also known as a reentry capsule, is used for launch and the journey back to Earth. Half of the descent module is covered by a heat-resistant covering to protect it during reentry; this half faces forward during reentry. It is slowed initially by the atmosphere, then by a braking parachute, followed by the main parachute, which slows the craft for landing. At one meter above the ground, solid-fuel braking engines mounted behind the heat shield are fired to give a soft landing. One of the design requirements for the descent module was for it to have the highest possible volumetric efficiency (internal volume divided by hull area). The best shape for this is a sphere – as the Vostok spacecraft's descent module used – but such a shape can provide no lift, resulting in a purely ballistic reentry. Ballistic reentries are hard on the occupants due to high deceleration and cannot be steered beyond their initial deorbit burn. Thus it was decided to go with the "headlight" shape that the Soyuz uses – a hemispherical upper area joined by a barely angled (seven degrees) conical section to a classic spherical section heat shield. This shape allows a small amount of lift to be generated due to the unequal weight distribution. The nickname was thought up at a time when nearly every headlight was circular. The small dimensions of the descent module led to it having only two-man crews after the death of the Soyuz 11 crew. The later Soyuz-T spacecraft solved this issue. Internal volume of Soyuz SA is 4 m^{3} (140 cu ft); 2.5 m^{3} (88 cu ft) is usable for crew (living space).

The thermal protection system on the slightly conical side walls is stood off from the structure to also provide micrometeoroid protection in orbit. The slightly curved heat shield on the bottom consists of "21mm to 28mm thick ablator (glass-phenolic composite) which is held by brackets approximately 15mm from the 3.5mm thick aluminum AMg-6 substrate. VIM low-density silica fibrous insulation (8mm thick) is contained in the gap between the heat shield ablator and aluminum substrate."

=== Service module ===
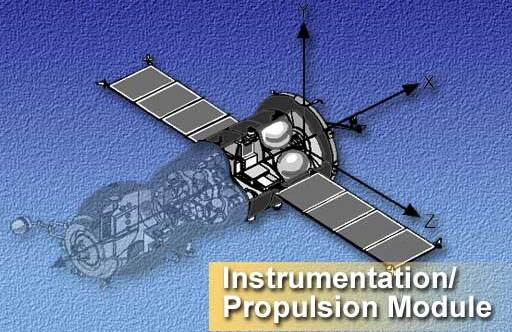
Drawing highlighting the instrumentation/propulsion module

At the back of the vehicle is the service module (Russian: прибо́рно-агрега́тный отсе́к, romanized: pribórno-agregátny otsék). It has a pressurized container shaped like a bulging can (instrumentation compartment, priborniy otsek) that contains systems for temperature control, electric power supply, long-range radio communications, radio telemetry, and instruments for orientation and control. A non-pressurized part of the service module (propulsion compartment, agregatniy otsek) contains the main engine and a liquid-fuelled propulsion system, using N_{2}O_{4} and UDMH, for maneuvering in orbit and initiating the descent back to Earth. The ship also has a system of low-thrust engines for orientation, attached to the intermediate compartment (perekhodnoi otsek). Outside the service module are the sensors for the orientation system and the solar array, which is oriented towards the Sun by rotating the ship. An incomplete separation between the service and reentry modules led to emergency situations during Soyuz 5, Soyuz TMA-10 and Soyuz TMA-11, which led to an incorrect reentry orientation (crew ingress hatch first). The failure of several explosive bolts did not cut the connection between the service and reentry modules on the later two flights.

=== Reentry procedure ===
The Soyuz uses a method similar to the 1970s-era United States Apollo command and service module to deorbit itself. The spacecraft is turned engine-forward (retrograde), and the main engine is fired for deorbiting on the far side of Earth ahead of its planned landing site. This requires the least propellant for reentry; the spacecraft travels on an elliptical Hohmann transfer orbit to the entry interface point, where atmospheric drag slows it enough to fall out of orbit.

Early Soyuz spacecraft would then have the service and orbital modules detach simultaneously from the descent module. As they are connected by tubing and electrical cables to the descent module, this would aid in their separation and avoid having the descent module alter its orientation. Later Soyuz spacecraft detached the orbital module before firing the main engine, which saved propellant. Since the Soyuz TM-5 landing issue, the orbital module is once again detached only after the reentry firing, which led to (but did not cause) emergency situations of Soyuz TMA-10 and TMA-11. The orbital module cannot remain in orbit as an addition to a space station, as the airlock hatch between the orbital and reentry modules is a part of the reentry module, and the orbital module therefore depressurizes after separation.

Reentry firing is usually done on the "dawn" side of the Earth, so that the spacecraft can be seen by recovery helicopters as it descends in the evening twilight, illuminated by the Sun when it is above the shadow of the Earth. The Soyuz craft is designed to come down on land, usually somewhere in the deserts of Kazakhstan in Central Asia. This is in contrast to the early United States crewed spacecraft and the current SpaceX Crew Dragon, which splash down in the ocean.

=== Spacecraft systems ===
Thermal and life support systems diagram

- Thermal control system: sistema obespecheniya teplovogo rezhima, SOTR
- Life support system: kompleks sistem obespecheniya zhiznedeyatelnosti, KSOZh
- Power supply system: sistema elektropitaniya, SEP
- Communication and tracking systems: Rassvet (Dawn) radio communications system, onboard measurement system (SBI), Kvant-V spacecraft control, Klyost-M television system, orbit radio tracking (RKO)
- Onboard complex control system: sistema upravleniya bortovym kompleksom, SUBK
- Combined propulsion system: kompleksnaya dvigatelnaya ustanovka, KDU
- Chaika-3 motion control system (SUD):
- Optical/visual devices (OVP): VSK-4 (vizir spetsialniy kosmicheskiy-4), night vision device (VNUK-K, visir nochnogo upravleniya po kursu), docking light, pilot's sight (VP-1, vizir pilota-1), laser rangefinder (LPR-1, lazerniy dalnomer-1)
- Kurs rendezvous system:
- SSVP docking system:
- TORU control mode:
- Entry actuators system: sistema ispolnitelnikh organov spuska, SIO-S
- Landing aids kit: kompleks sredstv prizemleniya, KSP
- Portable survival kit: nosimiy avariyniy zapas, NAZ, containing a TP-82 or Makarov pistol
- Launch escape system: sistema avariynogo spaseniya, SAS

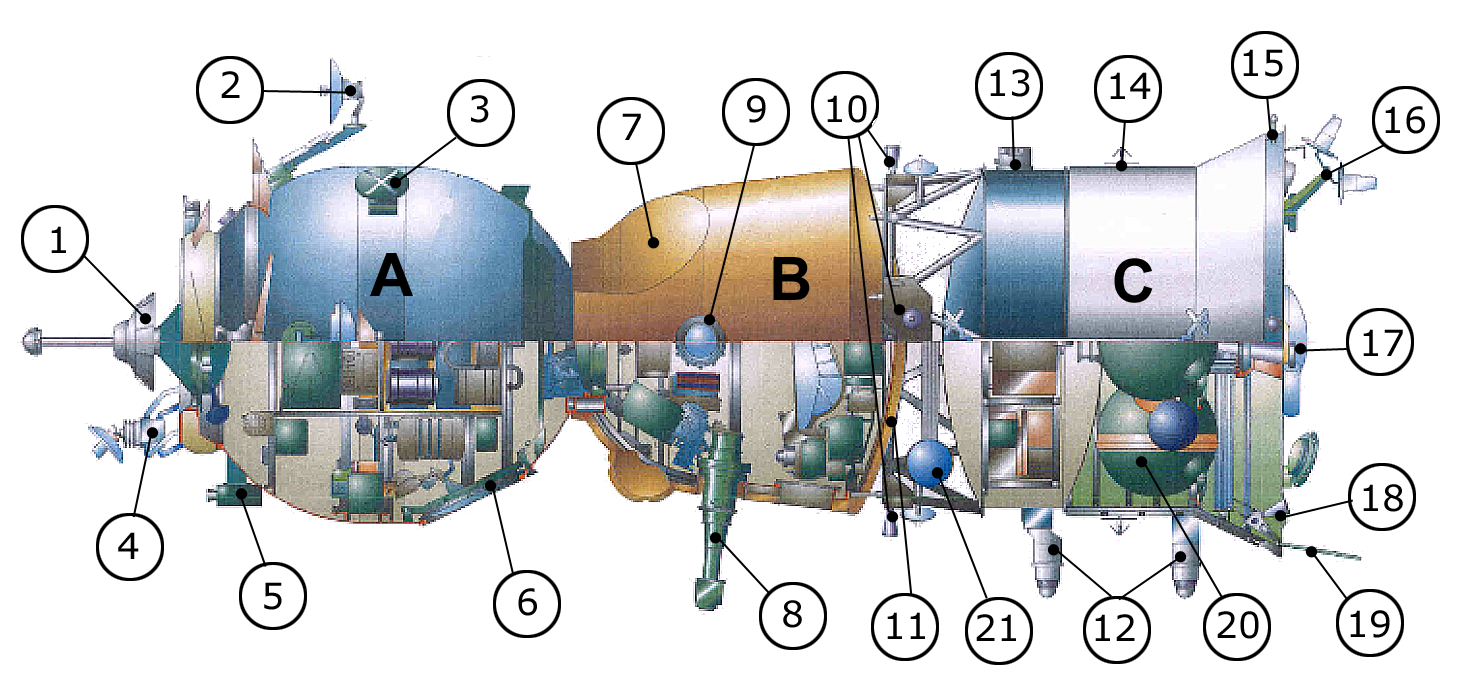

Orbital module (A)
1: SSVP docking mechanism
2, 4: Kurs rendezvous radar antenna
3: television transmission antenna
5: camera
6: hatch

Descent module (B)
7: parachute compartment
8: periscope
9: porthole
11: heat shield

Service module (C)
10, 18: attitude control engines
12: Earth sensors
13: Sun sensor
14: solar panel attachment point
15: thermal sensor
16: Kurs antenna
17: main propulsion
19: communication antenna
20: fuel tanks
21: oxygen tank

== Variants ==
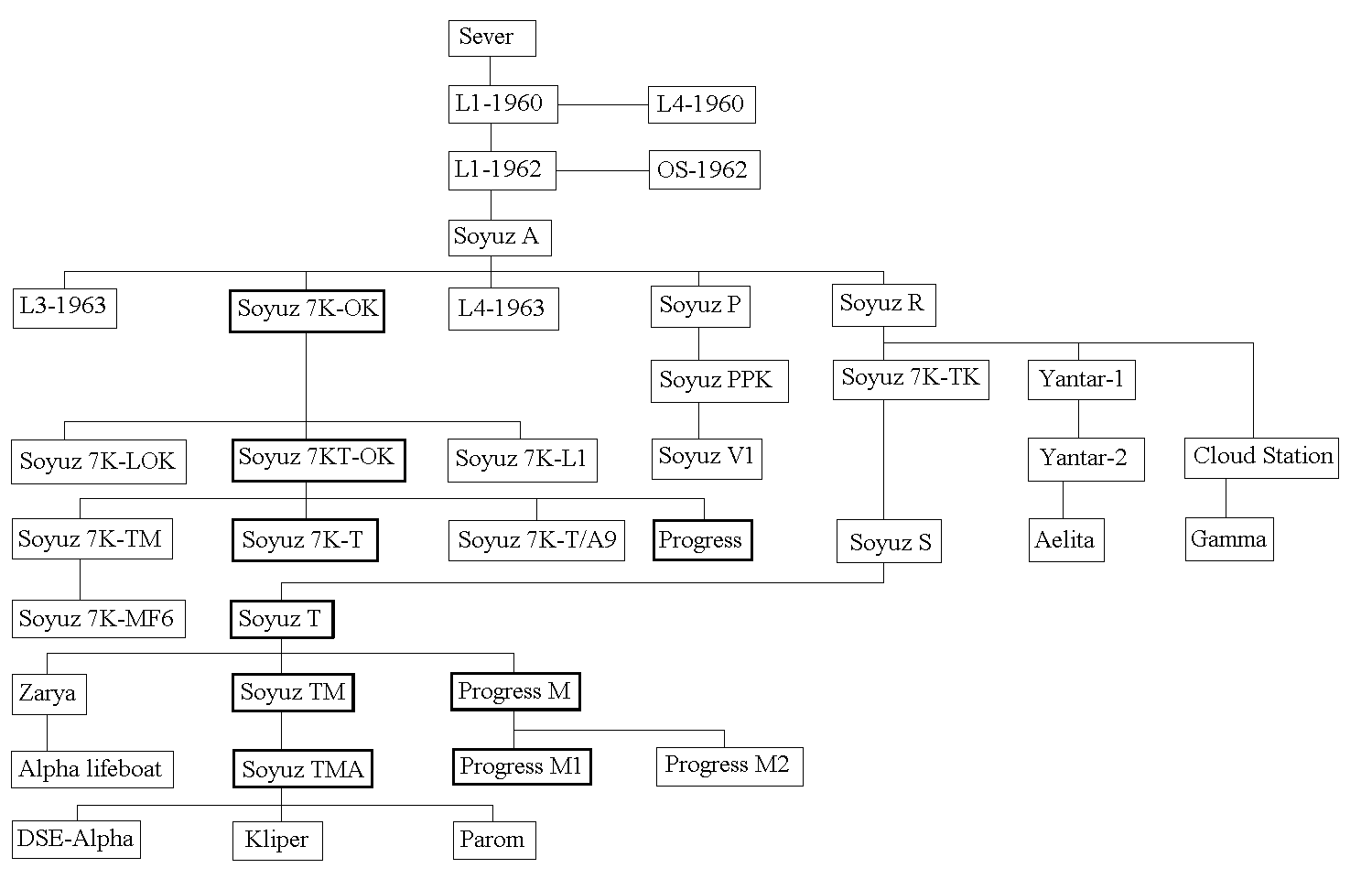
Soyuz family tree

The Soyuz spacecraft has been the subject of continuous evolution since the early 1960s. Thus several different versions, proposals and projects exist.

=== Specifications ===
	Soyuz 7K (1963)	Soyuz 7K-OK (1967–1970)	Soyuz 7K-L3	Soyuz 7K-T (1973–1981)	Soyuz 7K-TM (1975)	Soyuz-T (1976–1986)	Soyuz-TM (1986–2002)	Soyuz-TMA (2003–2012)	Soyuz TMA-M (2010–2016)	Soyuz MS (2016–present)
Total
Mass	5,880 kg (12,960 lb)	6,560 kg (14,460 lb)	9,850 kg (21,720 lb)	6,800 kg (15,000 lb)	6,680 kg (14,730 lb)	6,850 kg (15,100 lb)	7,250 kg (15,980 lb)	7,220 kg (15,920 lb)	7,150 kg (15,760 lb)	7,080 kg (15,610 lb)
Length	7.40 m (24 ft 3 in)	7.95 m (26 ft 1 in)	10.06 m (33 ft 0 in)	7.48 m (24 ft 6 in)	7.48 m (24 ft 6 in)	7.48 m (24 ft 6 in)	7.48 m (24 ft 6 in)	7.48 m (24 ft 6 in)	7.48 m (24 ft 6 in)	7.48 m (24 ft 6 in)
Diameter	2.50 m (8 ft 2 in)	2.72 m (8 ft 11 in)	2.93 m (9 ft 7 in)	2.72 m (8 ft 11 in)	2.72 m (8 ft 11 in)	2.72 m (8 ft 11 in)	2.72 m (8 ft 11 in)	2.72 m (8 ft 11 in)	2.72 m (8 ft 11 in)	2.72 m (8 ft 11 in)
Span	?	9.80 m (32 ft 2 in)	10.06 m (33 ft 0 in)	9.80 m (32 ft 2 in)	8.37 m (27 ft 6 in)	10.6 m (34 ft 9 in)	10.6 m (34 ft 9 in)	10.7 m (35 ft 1 in)	10.7 m (35 ft 1 in)	10.7 m (35 ft 1 in)
Orbital module
Mass	1,000 kg (2,200 lb)	1,100 kg (2,400 lb)	?	1,350 kg (2,980 lb)	1,224 kg (2,698 lb)	1,100 kg (2,400 lb)	1,450 kg (3,200 lb)	1,370 kg (3,020 lb)	1,350 kg (2,980 lb)	1,350 kg (2,980 lb)
Length	3.00 m (9 ft 10 in)	3.45 m (11 ft 4 in)	2.26 m (7 ft 5 in)	2.98 m (9 ft 9 in)	3.10 m (10 ft 2 in)	2.98 m (9 ft 9 in)	2.98 m (9 ft 9 in)	2.98 m (9 ft 9 in)	2.98 m (9 ft 9 in)	2.98 m (9 ft 9 in)
Diameter	2.20 m (7 ft 3 in)	2.25 m (7 ft 5 in)	2.30 m (7 ft 7 in)	2.26 m (7 ft 5 in)	2.26 m (7 ft 5 in)	2.26 m (7 ft 5 in)	2.26 m (7 ft 5 in)	2.26 m (7 ft 5 in)	2.26 m (7 ft 5 in)	2.26 m (7 ft 5 in)
Volume	2.20 m^{3} (78 cu ft)	5.00 m^{3} (177 cu ft)	?	5.00 m^{3} (177 cu ft)	5.00 m^{3} (177 cu ft)	5.00 m^{3} (177 cu ft)	5.00 m^{3} (177 cu ft)	5.00 m^{3} (177 cu ft)	5.00 m^{3} (177 cu ft)	5.00 m^{3} (177 cu ft)
Reentry module
Mass	2,480 kg (5,470 lb)	2,810 kg (6,190 lb)	2,804 kg (6,182 lb)	2,850 kg (6,280 lb)	2,802 kg (6,177 lb)	3,000 kg (6,600 lb)	2,850 kg (6,280 lb)	2,950 kg (6,500 lb)	2,950 kg (6,500 lb)	2,950 kg (6,500 lb)
Length	2.30 m (7 ft 7 in)	2.24 m (7 ft 4 in)	2.19 m (7 ft 2 in)	2.24 m (7 ft 4 in)	2.24 m (7 ft 4 in)	2.24 m (7 ft 4 in)	2.24 m (7 ft 4 in)	2.24 m (7 ft 4 in)	2.24 m (7 ft 4 in)	2.24 m (7 ft 4 in)
Diameter	2.17 m (7 ft 1 in)	2.17 m (7 ft 1 in)	2.2 m (7 ft 3 in)	2.17 m (7 ft 1 in)	2.17 m (7 ft 1 in)	2.17 m (7 ft 1 in)	2.17 m (7 ft 1 in)	2.17 m (7 ft 1 in)	2.17 m (7 ft 1 in)	2.17 m (7 ft 1 in)
Volume	4.00 m^{3} (141 cu ft)	4.00 m^{3} (141 cu ft)	?	3.50 m^{3} (124 cu ft)	4.00 m^{3} (141 cu ft)	4.00 m^{3} (141 cu ft)	3.50 m^{3} (124 cu ft)	3.50 m^{3} (124 cu ft)	3.50 m^{3} (124 cu ft)	3.50 m^{3} (124 cu ft)
Service module
Mass	2,400 kg (5,300 lb)	2,650 kg (5,840 lb)	?	2,700 kg (6,000 lb)	2,654 kg (5,851 lb)	2,750 kg (6,060 lb)	2,950 kg (6,500 lb)	2,900 kg (6,400 lb)	2,900 kg (6,400 lb)	2,900 kg (6,400 lb)
Usable fuel	830 kg (1,830 lb)	500 kg (1,100 lb)	3,152 kg (6,949 lb)	500 kg (1,100 lb)	500 kg (1,100 lb)	700 kg (1,500 lb)	880 kg (1,940 lb)	880 kg (1,940 lb)	800 kg (1,800 lb)	800 kg (1,800 lb)
Length	2.10 m (6 ft 11 in)	2.26 m (7 ft 5 in)	2.82 m (9 ft 3 in)	2.26 m (7 ft 5 in)	2.26 m (7 ft 5 in)	2.26 m (7 ft 5 in)	2.26 m (7 ft 5 in)	2.26 m (7 ft 5 in)	2.26 m (7 ft 5 in)	2.26 m (7 ft 5 in)
Diameter	2.50 m (8 ft 2 in)	2.72 m (8 ft 11 in)	2.20 m (7 ft 3 in)	2.72 m (8 ft 11 in)	2.72 m (8 ft 11 in)	2.72 m (8 ft 11 in)	2.72 m (8 ft 11 in)	2.72 m (8 ft 11 in)	2.72 m (8 ft 11 in)	2.72 m (8 ft 11 in)

=== Soyuz 7K (part of the 7K-9K-11K circumlunar complex) (1963) ===
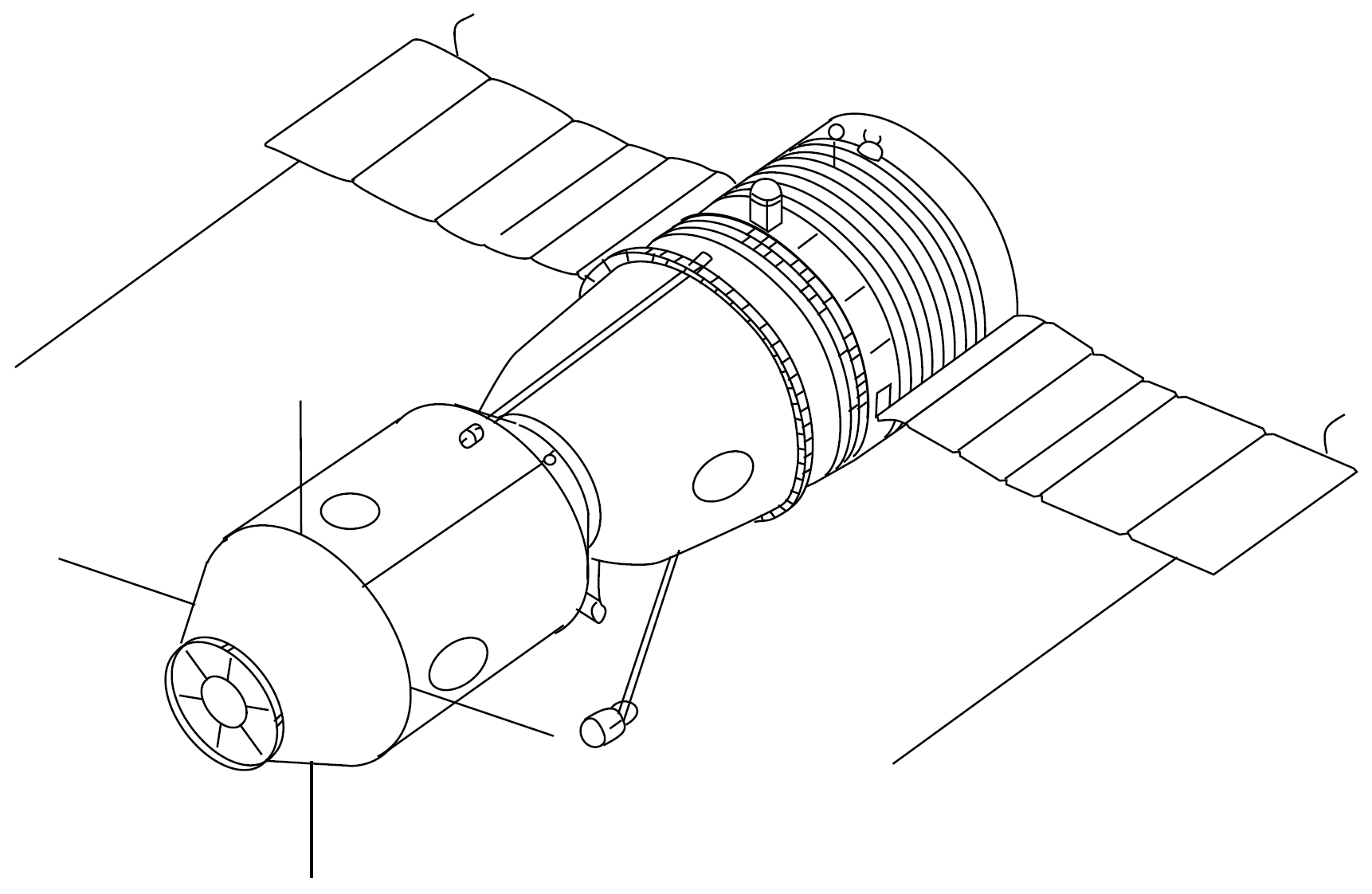
Soyuz 7K crewed spacecraft concept (1963)

Sergei Korolev initially promoted the Soyuz A-B-V circumlunar complex (7K-9K-11K) concept (also known as L1) in which a two-man craft Soyuz 7K would rendezvous with other components (9K and 11K) in Earth orbit to assemble a lunar excursion vehicle, the components being delivered by the proven R-7 rocket.

=== First generation ===
Soyuz 7K-OK spacecraft with an active docking unit

Soyuz 7K-OKS for Salyut space stations

The crewed Soyuz spacecraft can be classified into design generations. Soyuz 1 through Soyuz 11 (1967–1971) were first-generation vehicles, carrying a crew of up to three without spacesuits and distinguished from those following by their bent solar panels and their use of the Igla automatic docking navigation system, which required special radar antennas. This first generation encompassed the original Soyuz 7K-OK and the Soyuz 7K-OKS for docking with the Salyut 1 space station. The probe and drogue docking system permitted internal transfer of cosmonauts from the Soyuz to the station.

The Soyuz 7K-L1 was designed to launch a crew from the Earth to circle the Moon, and was the primary hope for a Soviet circumlunar flight. It had several test flights in the Zond program from 1967 to 1970 (Zond 4 to Zond 8), which produced multiple failures in the 7K-L1's reentry systems. The remaining 7K-L1s were scrapped. The Soyuz 7K-L3 was designed and developed in parallel to the Soyuz 7K-L1, but was also scrapped. Soyuz 1 was plagued with technical issues, and cosmonaut Vladimir Komarov was killed when the spacecraft crashed during its return to Earth. This was the first in-flight fatality in the history of spaceflight.

The next crewed version of the Soyuz was the Soyuz 7K-OKS. It was designed for space station flights and had a docking port that allowed internal transfer between spacecraft. The Soyuz 7K-OKS had two crewed flights, both in 1971. Soyuz 11, the second flight, depressurized upon reentry, killing its three-man crew.

=== Second generation ===
Upgraded Soyuz 7K-T version

The second generation, called Soyuz Ferry or Soyuz 7K-T, comprised Soyuz 12 through Soyuz 40 (1973–1981). It did not have solar arrays. Two long, skinny antennas were put in the solar panels's place. It was developed out of the military Soyuz concepts studied in previous years and was capable of carrying 2 cosmonauts with Sokol space suits (after the Soyuz 11 accident). Several models were planned, but none actually flew in space. These versions were named Soyuz P, Soyuz PPK, Soyuz R, Soyuz 7K-VI, and Soyuz OIS (Orbital Research Station).

The Soyuz 7K-T/A9 version was used for the flights to the military Almaz space station.

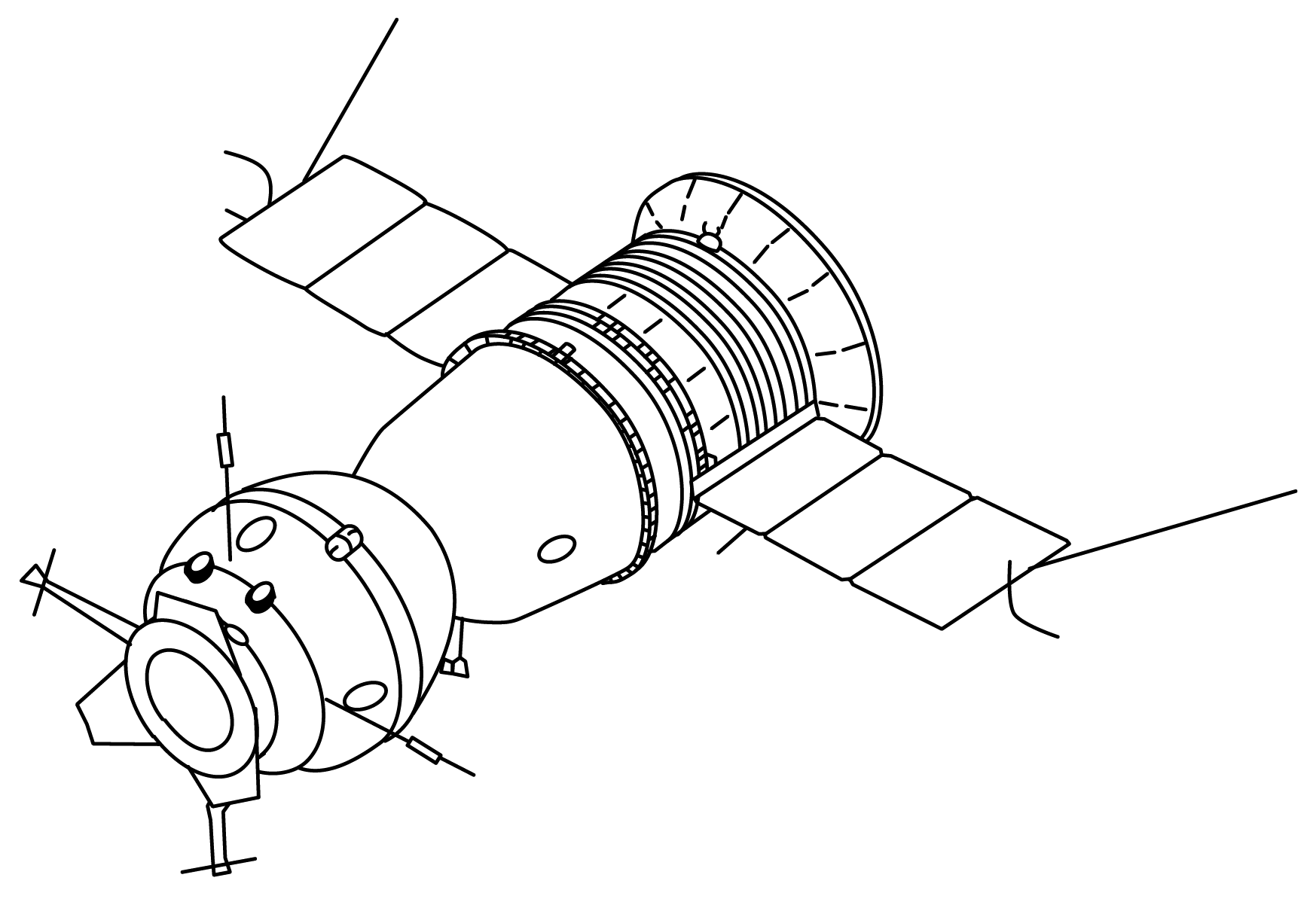
Soyuz 7K-TM used during ASTP

Soyuz 7K-TM was the spacecraft used in the Apollo-Soyuz Test Project in 1975, which saw the first and only docking of a Soyuz spacecraft with an Apollo command and service module. It was also flown in 1976 for the Earth-science mission, Soyuz 22. Soyuz 7K-TM served as a technological bridge to the third generation.

=== Third generation ===
Soyuz-T spacecraft

The third generation Soyuz-T spacecraft, where the "T" stands for "transport" (Russian: транспортный, romanized: transportnyi), featured solar panels again, allowing longer missions, a revised Igla rendezvous system and new translation/attitude thruster system on the Service module. It could carry a crew of three, now wearing spacesuits. It was used from 1976 until 1986.

=== Fourth generation ===
==== Soyuz-TM (1986–2002) ====
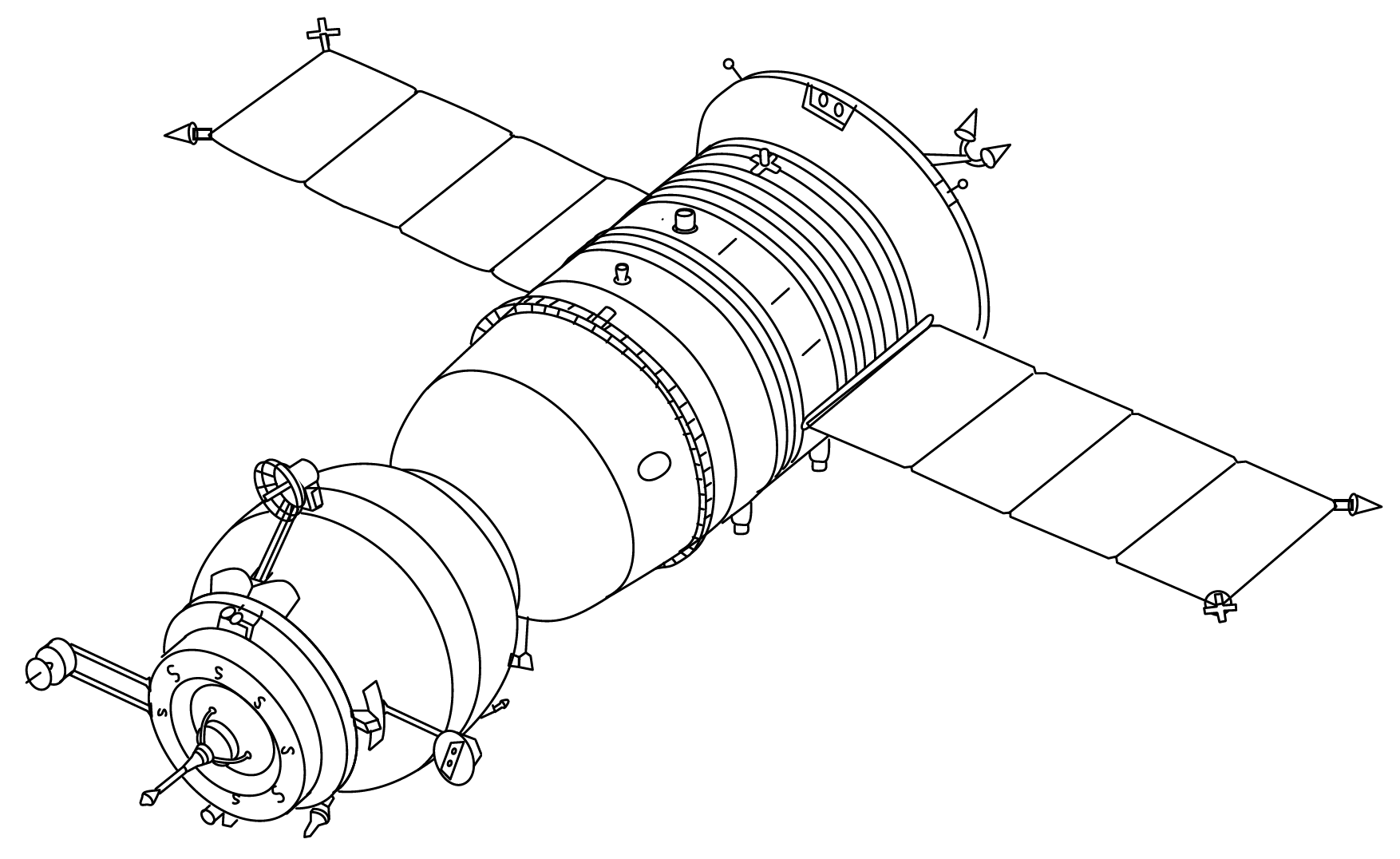
Soyuz-TM spacecraft

The fourth generation Soyuz-TM spacecraft, where the "M" stands for "modified" (Russian: модифицированный, romanized: modifitsirovannyi), were used from 1986 to 2002 for ferry flights to Mir and the International Space Station (ISS).

==== Soyuz TMA (2003–2012) ====
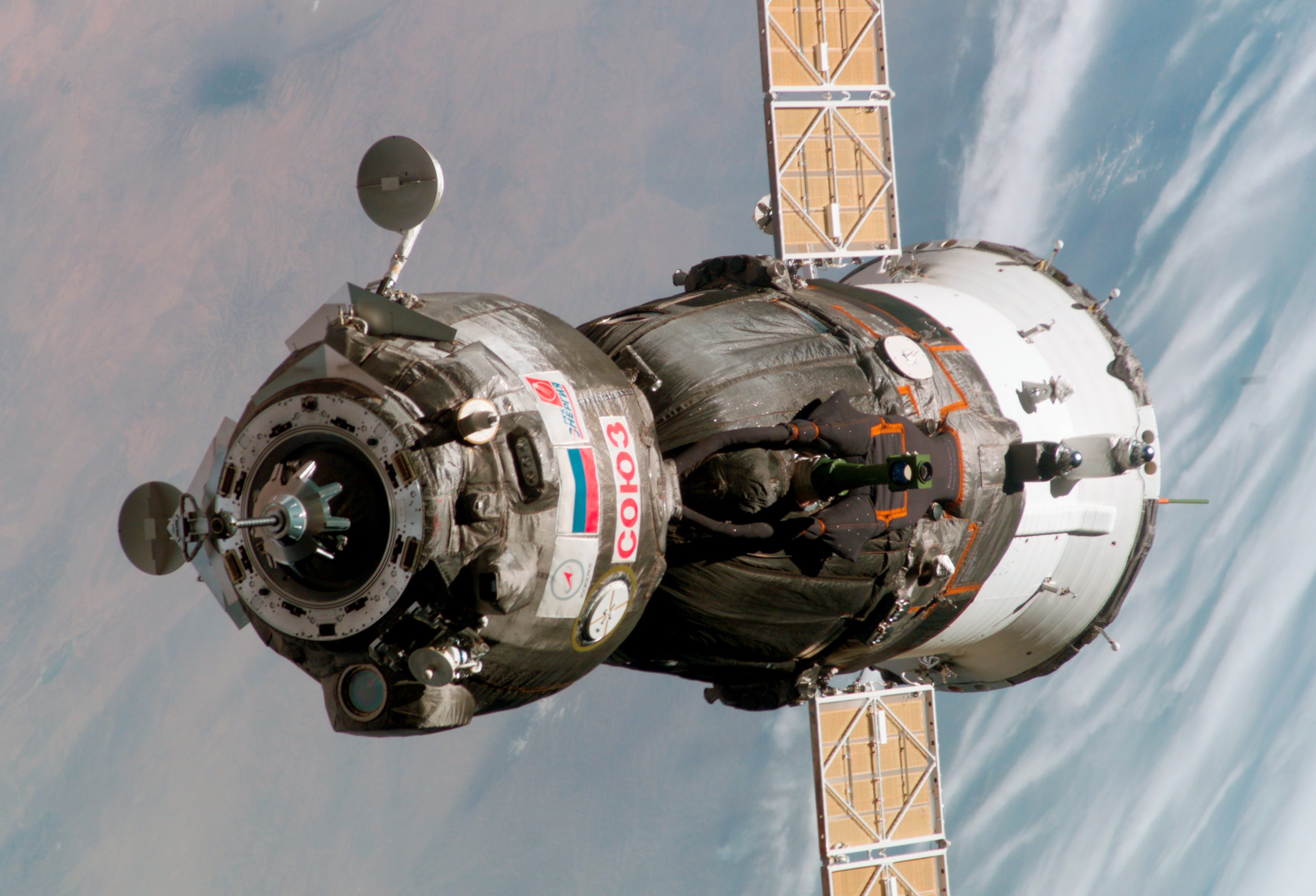
The Soyuz TMA-6

The Soyuz TMA spacecraft, where the "A" stands for "anthropometric" (Russian: антропометрический, romanized: antropometricheskii), featured several changes to accommodate requirements requested by NASA in order to service the International Space Station (ISS), including more latitude in the height and weight of the crew and improved parachute systems. It was also the first expendable vehicle to feature a digital control technology. Soyuz-TMA looked identical to a Soyuz-TM spacecraft on the outside, but interior differences allowed it to accommodate taller occupants with new adjustable crew couches.

==== Soyuz TMA-M (2010–2016) ====
The Soyuz TMA-M was an upgrade of the Soyuz-TMA, using a new computer, digital interior displays, updated docking equipment, and the vehicle's total mass was reduced by 70 kilograms. The new version debuted on 7 October 2010 with the launch of Soyuz TMA-01M, carrying the ISS Expedition 25 crew.

The Soyuz TMA-08M mission set a new record for the fastest crewed docking with a space station. The mission used a new six-hour rendezvous, faster than the previous Soyuz launches, which had, since 1986, taken two days.

==== Soyuz MS (since 2016) ====
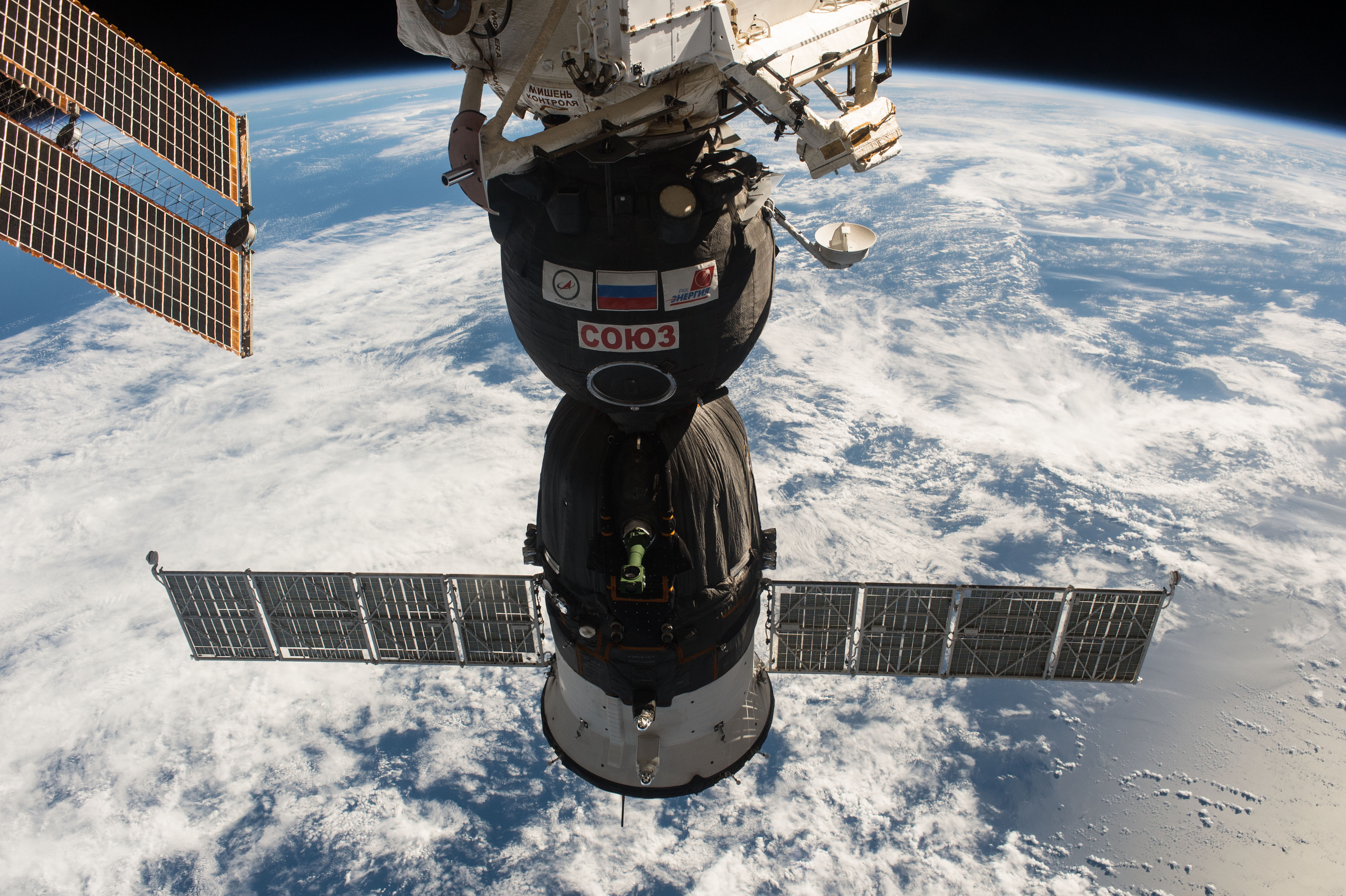
Soyuz MS-01 docked to the ISS.

Soyuz MS is the final planned upgrade of the Soyuz spacecraft. The "MS" stands for "modernized systems," reflecting upgrades primarily focused on the communications and navigation subsystems. Its maiden flight was in July 2016 with mission Soyuz MS-01.

Major changes include the new Kurs-NA rendezvous system, satellite navigation, re-arranged attitude control thrusters, an improved docking mechanism, a reusable black box, power system improvements, additional micro-meteoroid protection, and a digital camera system.

== Related craft ==
The uncrewed Progress spacecraft are derived from Soyuz and are used for servicing space stations.

In 1995, China signed an agreement with Russia to acquire space technologies. The deal included the transfer of Soyuz spacecraft, life support systems, docking systems, and space suits. Leveraging this equipment, China developed its own Shenzhou spacecraft. While the Shenzhou is not a direct derivative of the Soyuz, it incorporates significant technology and design elements from the spacecraft because of the collaboration.

== Image gallery ==
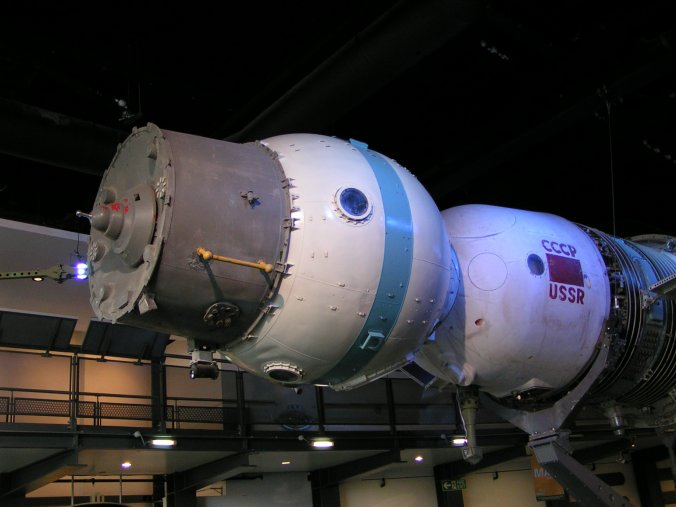
Early 7K-OK Soyuz at National Space Centre in Leicester, England

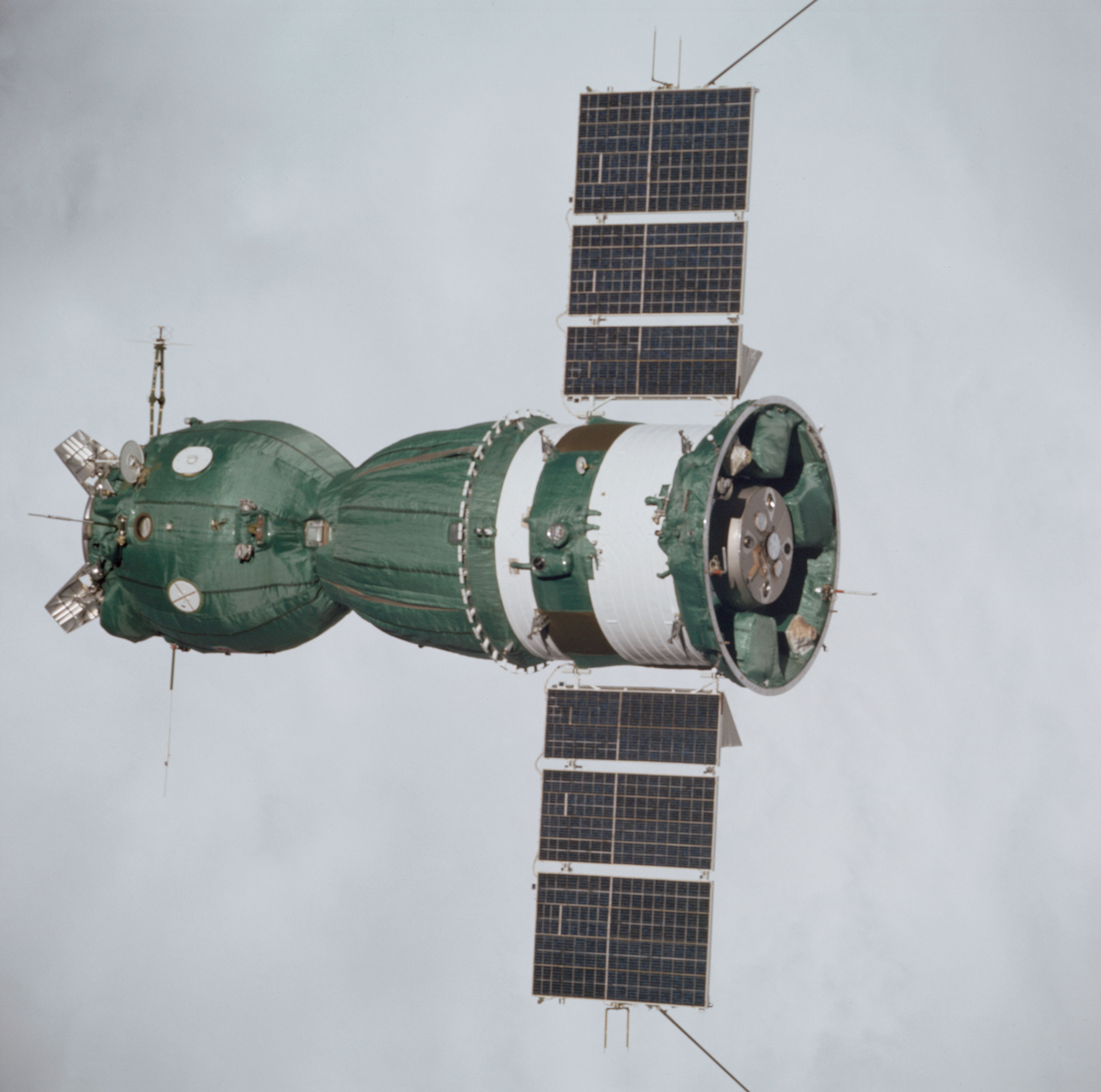
Soyuz spacecraft of the Apollo–Soyuz Test Project (ASTP)

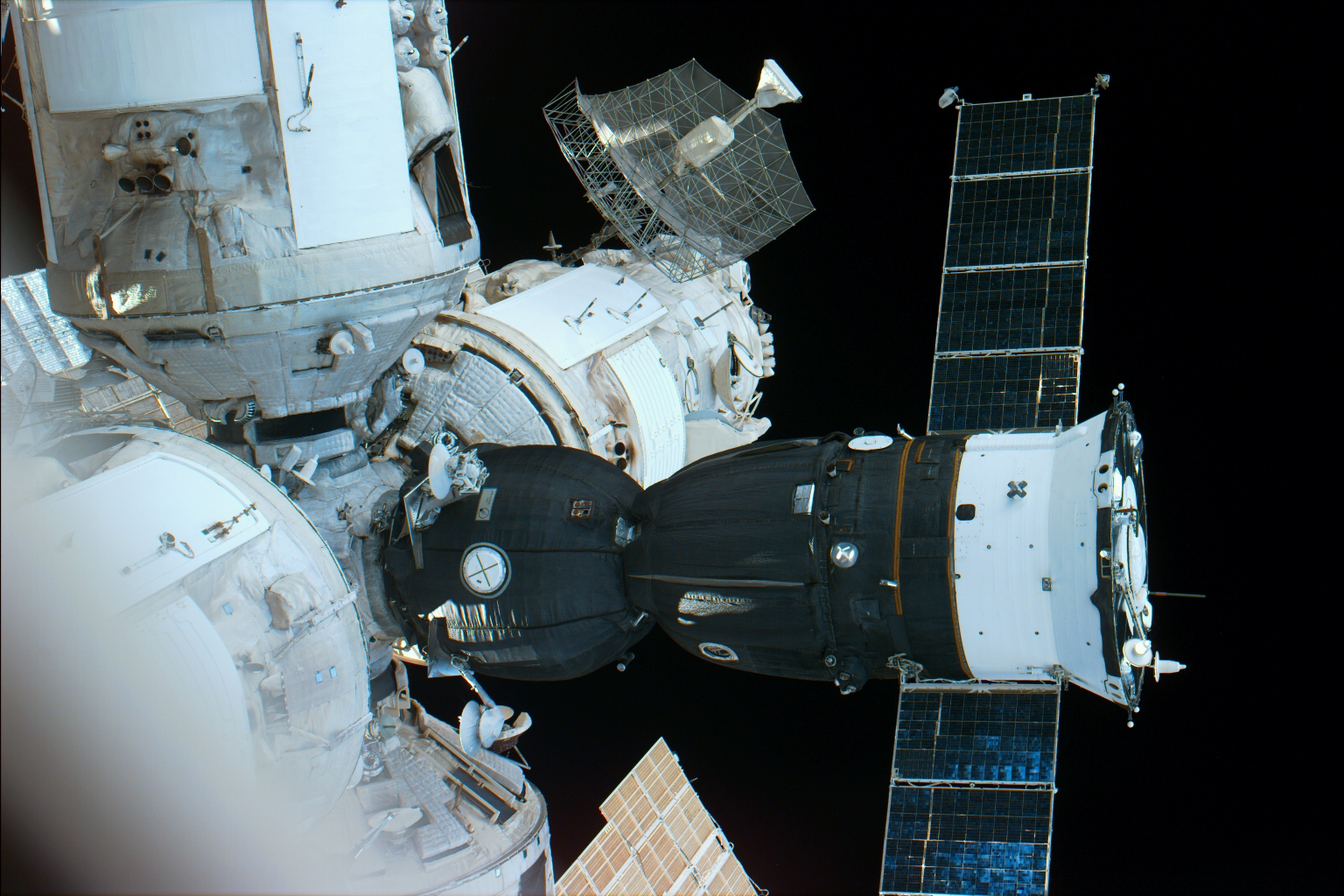
Soyuz docked to Mir

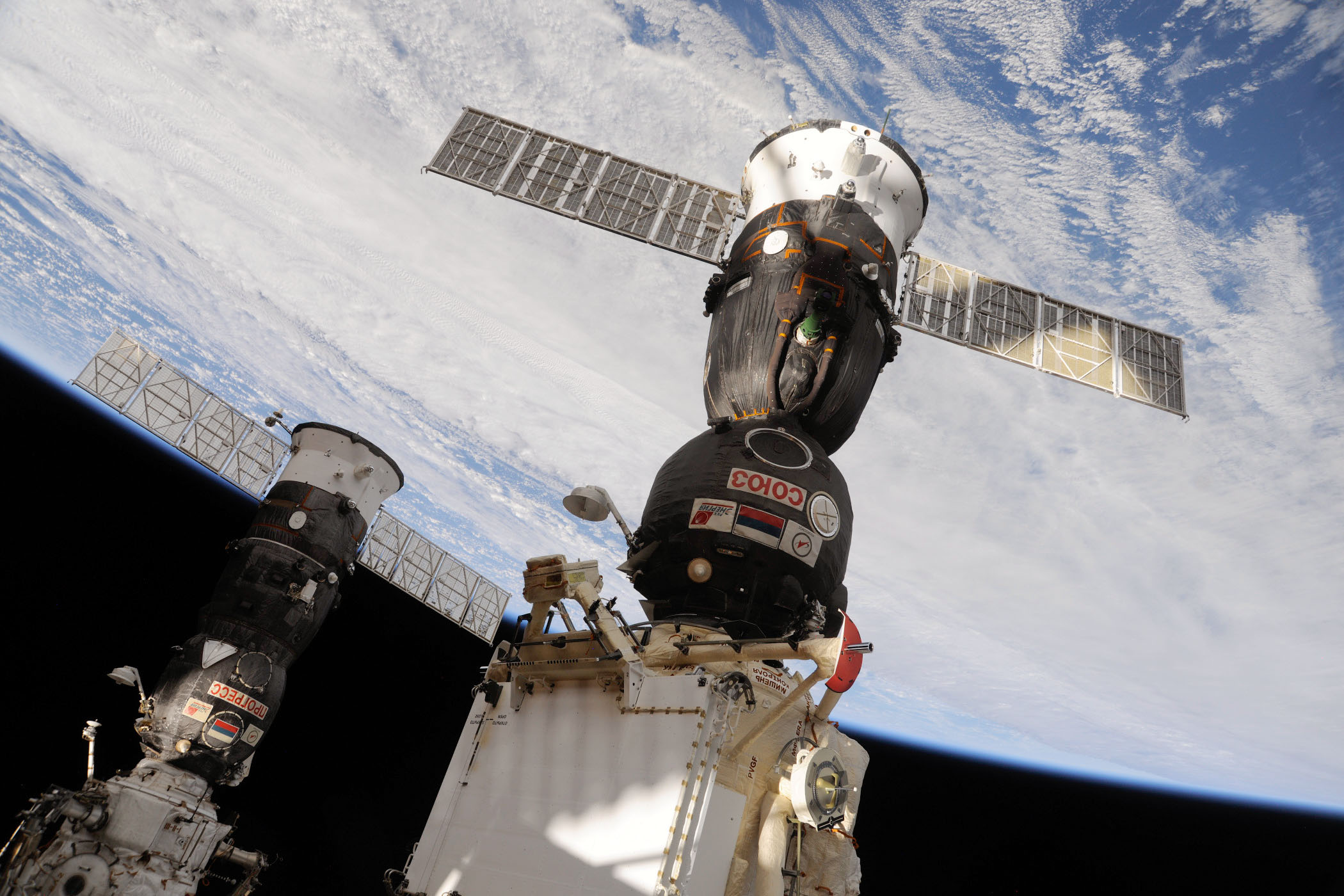
Soyuz docked to ISS

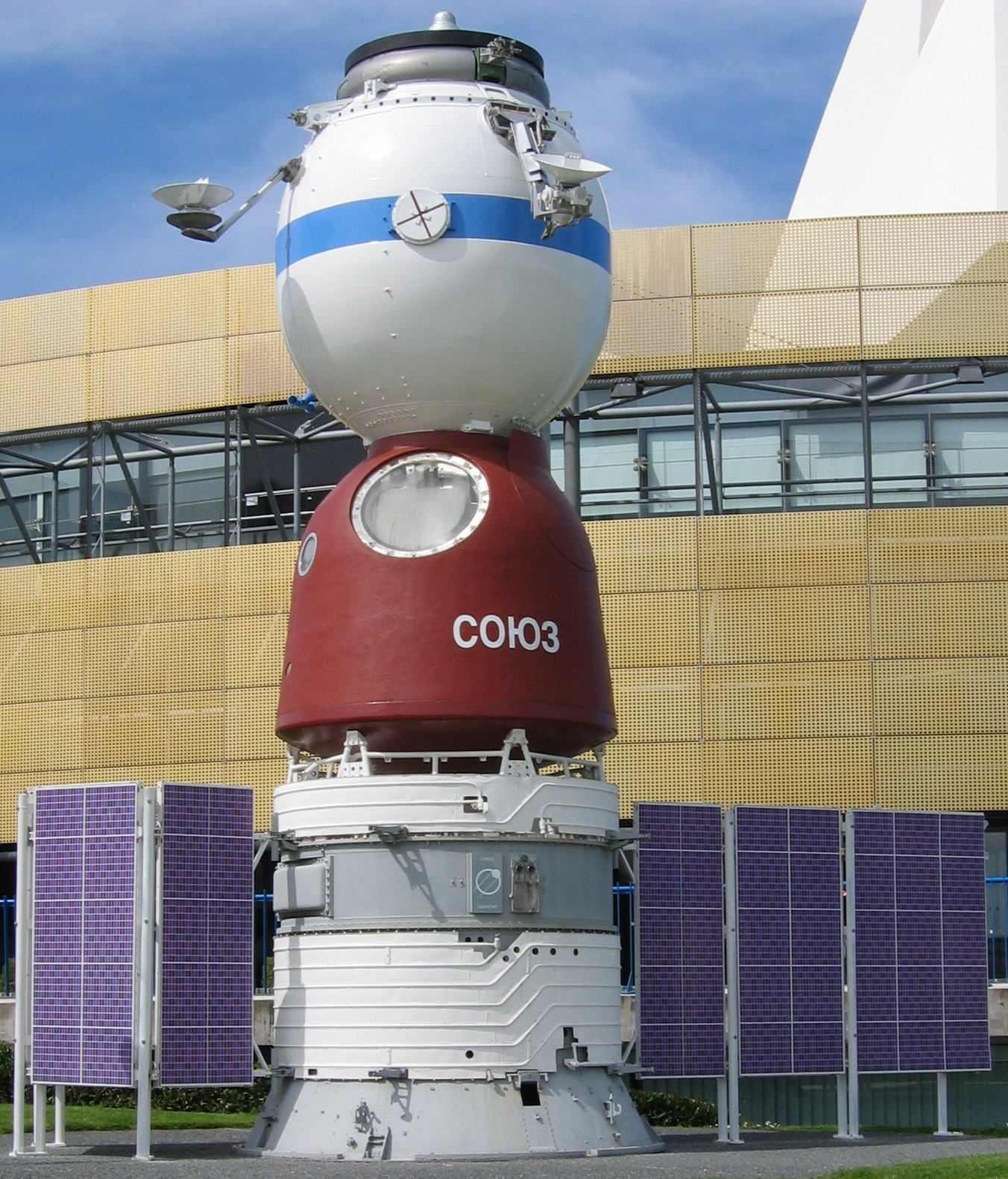
A Soyuz mock-up shows how its modules are connected

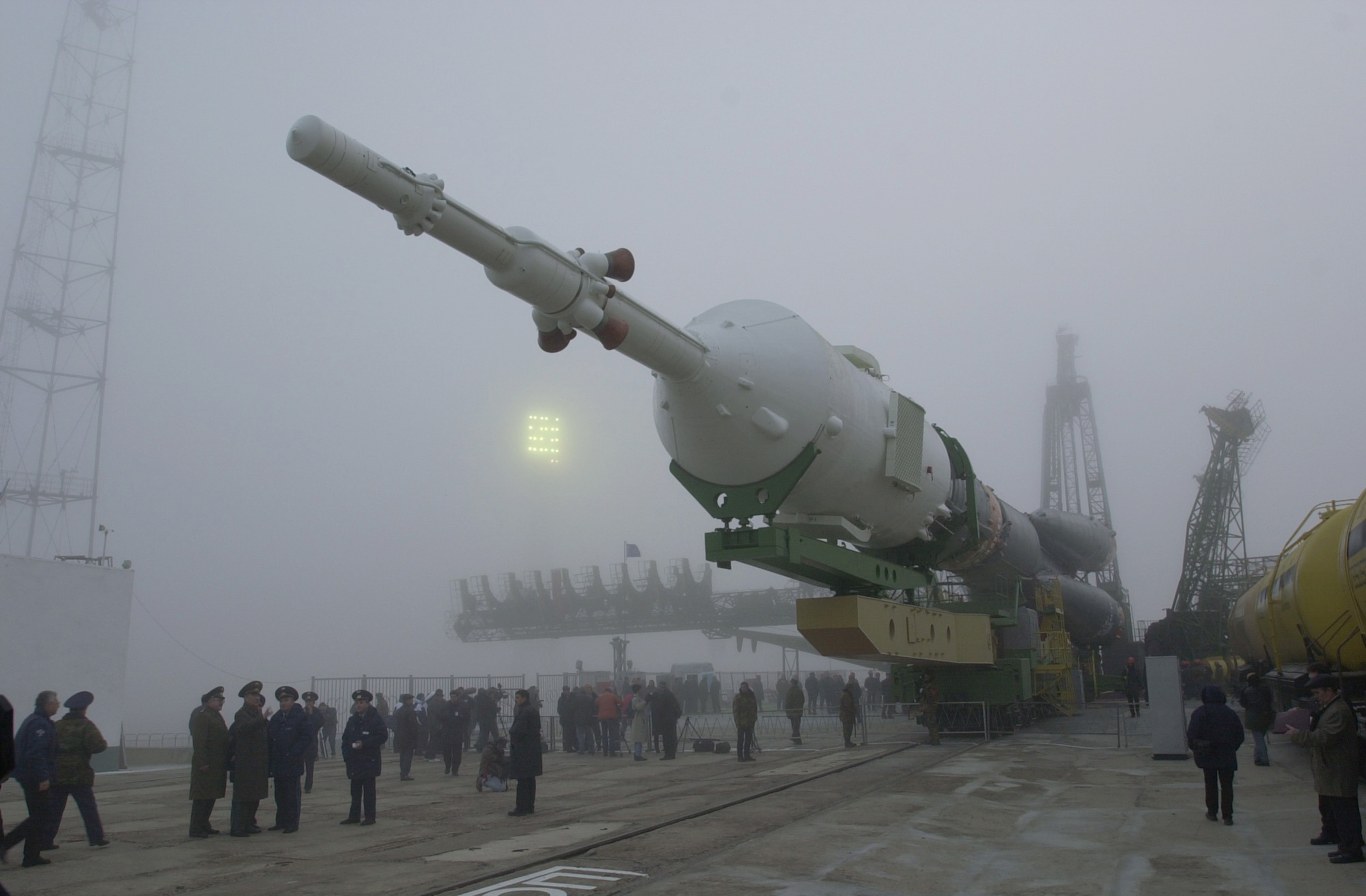
Soyuz TM-31 moves to Launch Pad on 29 October 2000

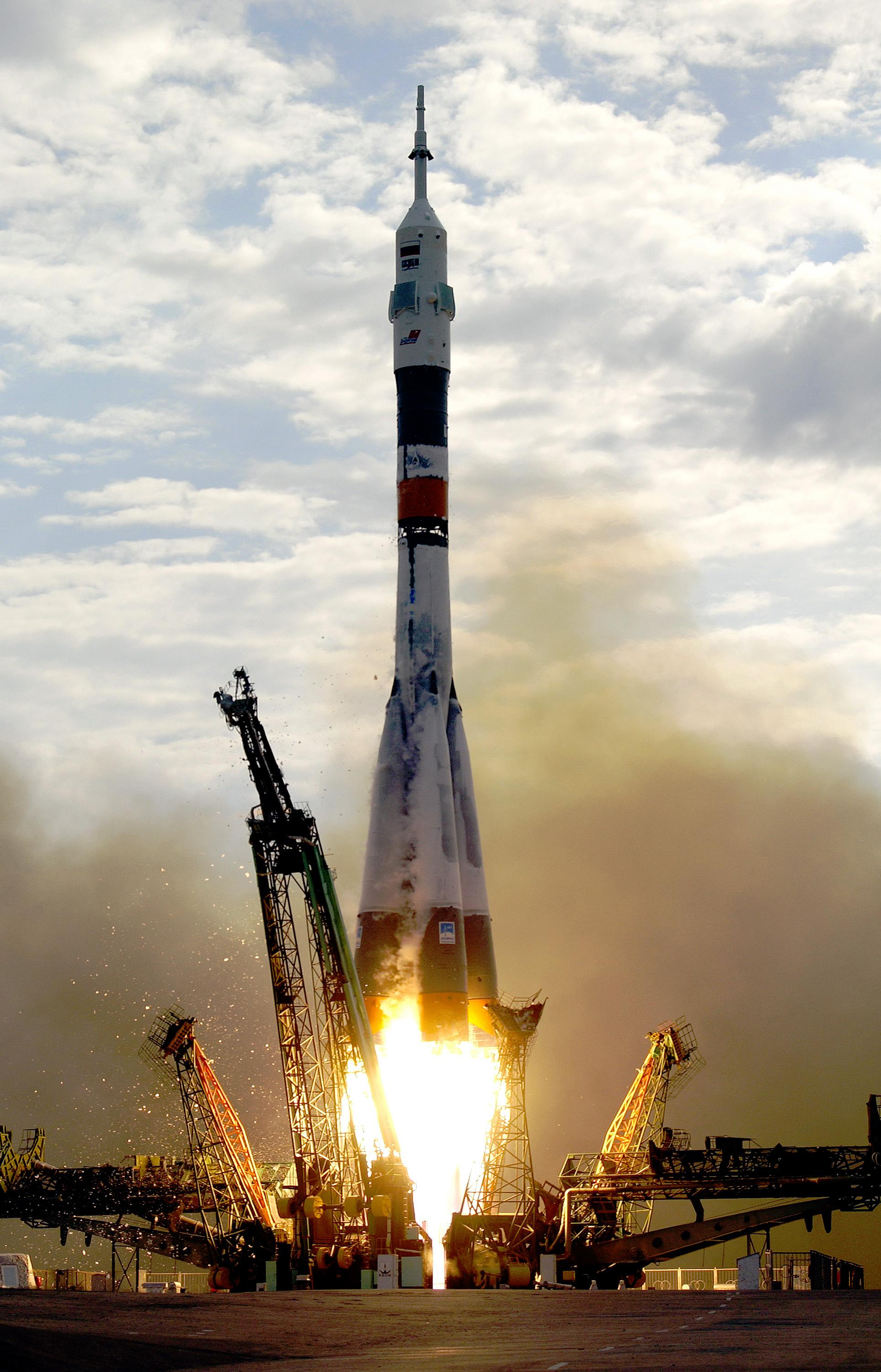
Soyuz TMA-2 launch from Baikonur on April 26, 2003

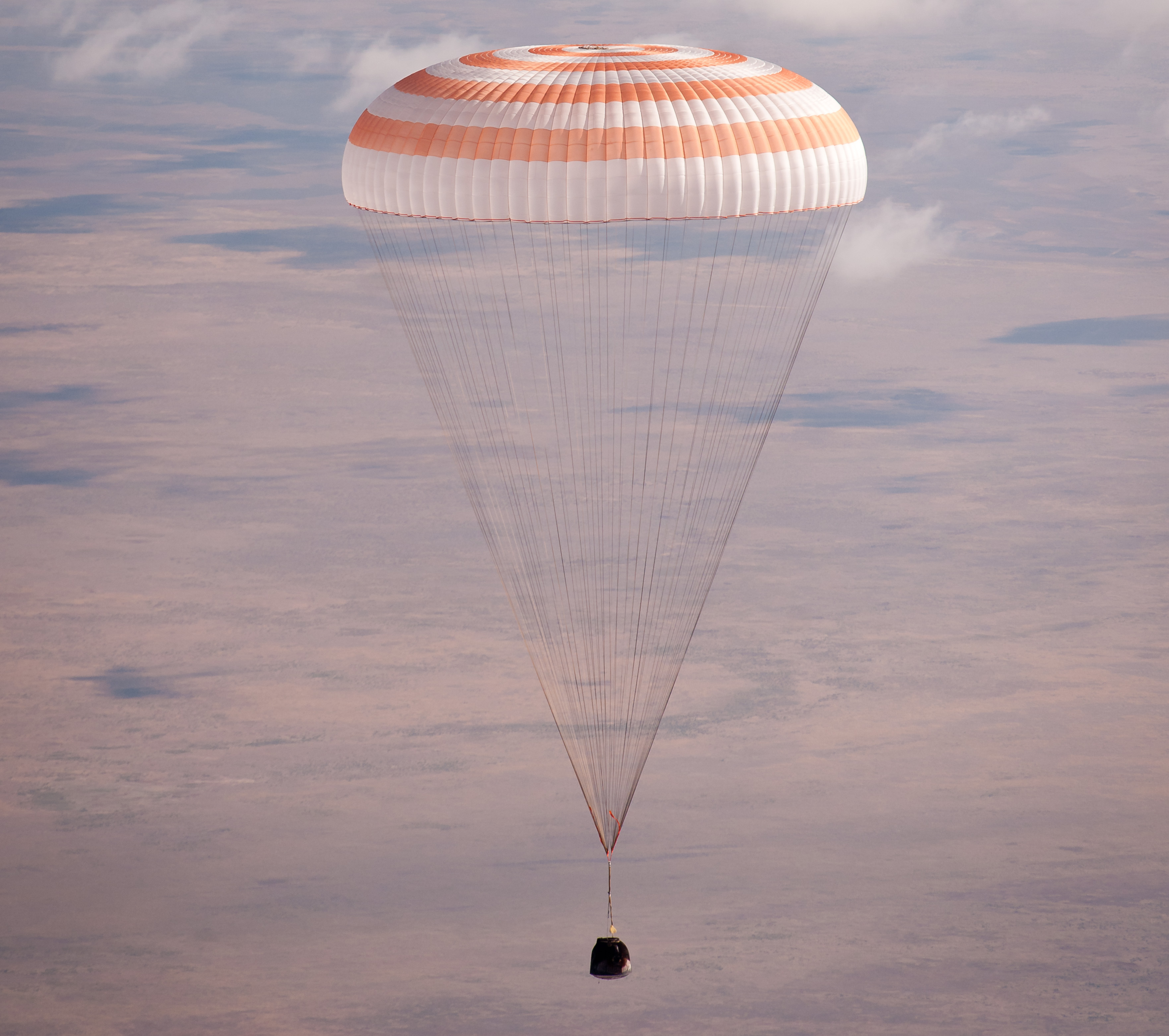
Soyuz TMA-21 with parachute deployed

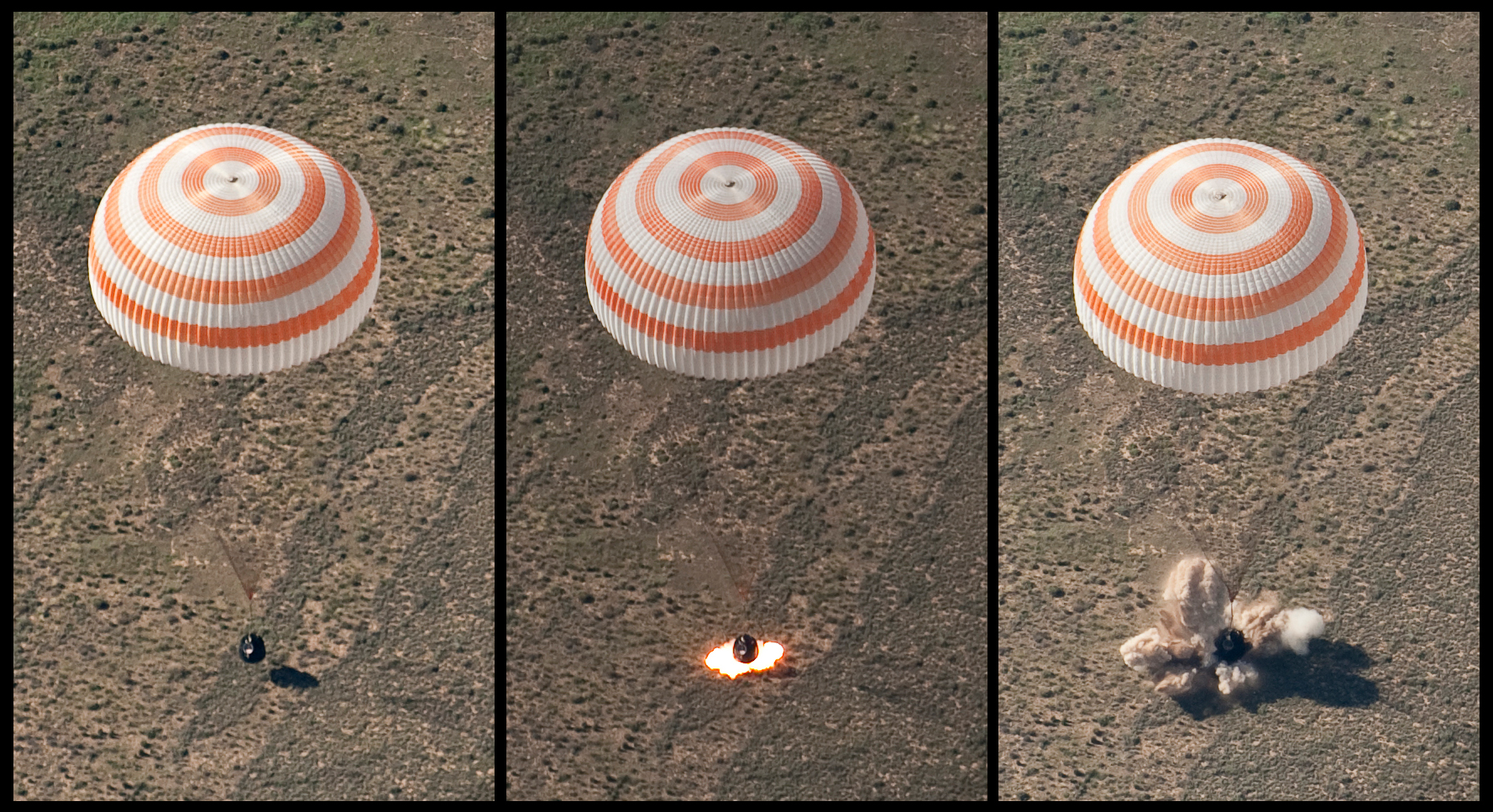
Soyuz landing sequence

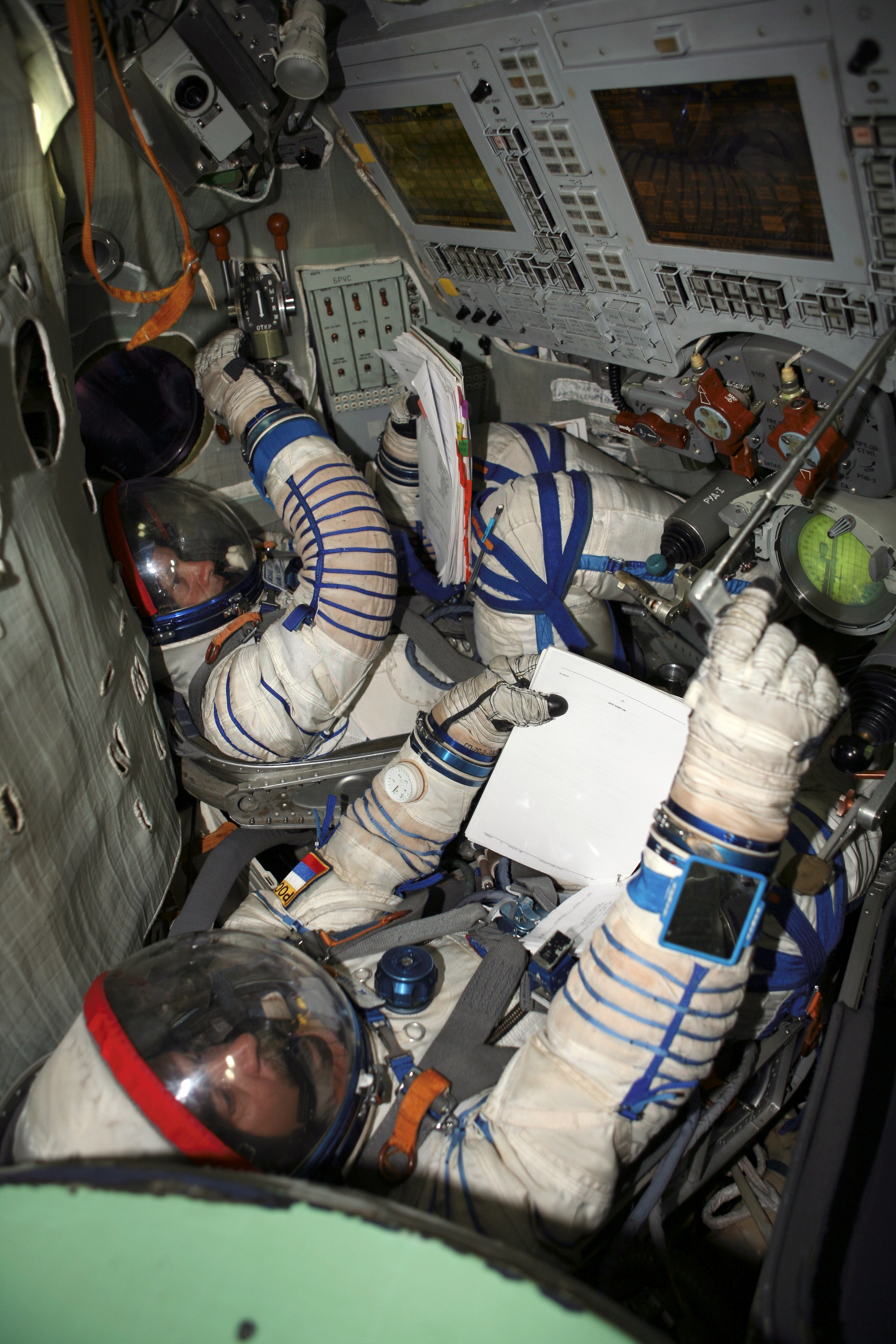
Training session in a Soyuz simulator

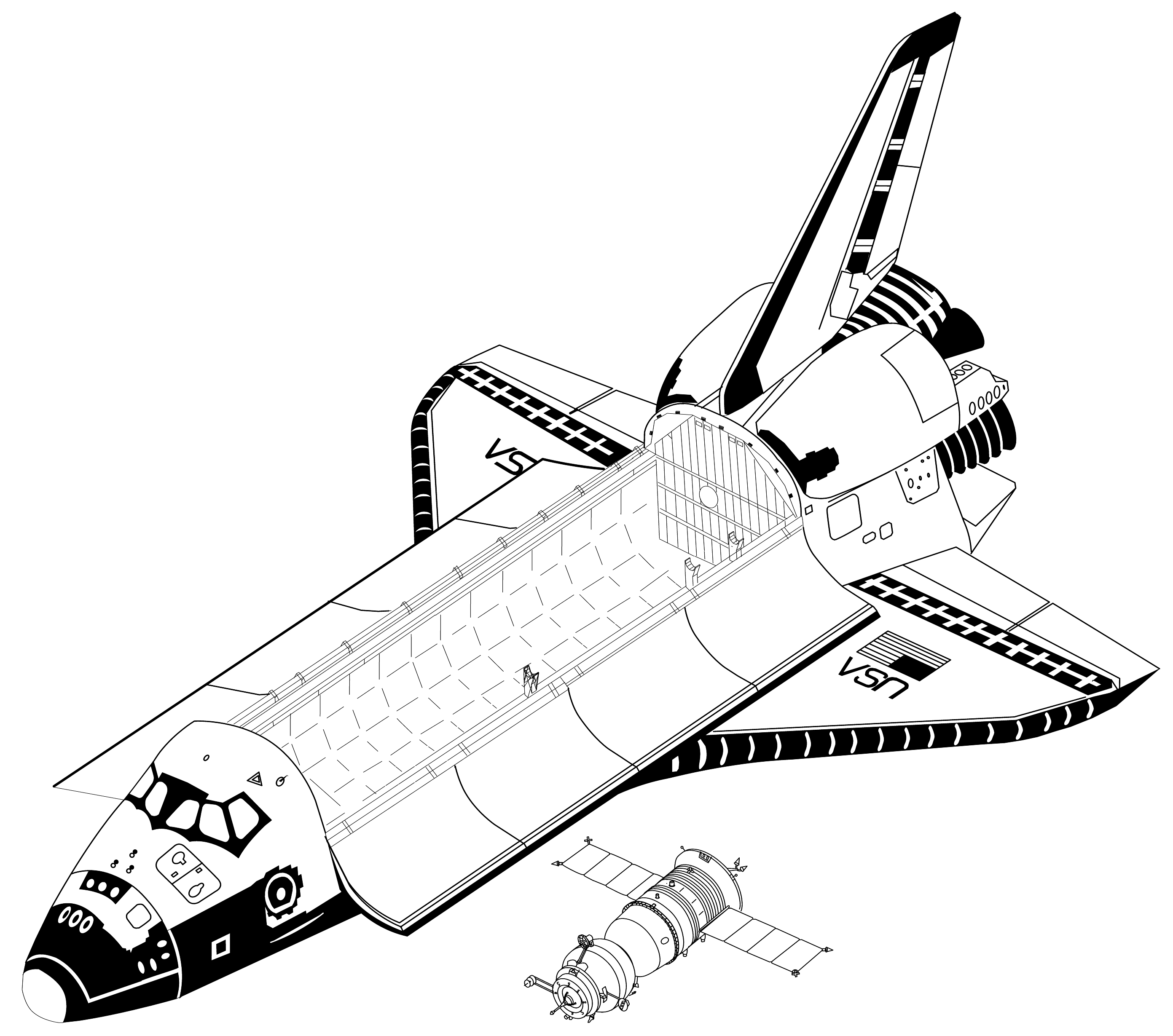
Space Shuttle and Soyuz (drawn to scale)

== See also ==
- Crew Space Transportation System (CSTS), a cancelled study to develop a European-Russian successor to Soyuz.
- Orel, a Russian replacement for the Soyuz, first crewed flight scheduled for 2025. Influenced by CSTS.
- Shenzhou, a Chinese spacecraft whose design is based on the Soyuz
- Dragon 2, American commercial human spaceflight system
- List of Soviet human spaceflight missions
- List of Russian human spaceflight missions
- Orbital Technologies Commercial Space Station
- Sokol space suit
- Space Shuttle orbiter, American re-usable spacecraft from 1981 to 2011
- Voskhod Spacecraft "Globus" IMP navigation instrument
- Zarya (spacecraft)
- List of Soyuz missions
