= Soyuz P =

Proposed Soviet combat spacecraft

- Manufacturer: Korolev
- Country of origin: Soviet Union
- Operator: Soviet space program
- Applications: Crewed satellite interceptor

Specifications
- Launch mass: 6,700 kilograms (14,800 lb)
- Regime: Low Earth Orbit

Production
- Status: Cancelled
- Built: None

Related spacecraft
- Derivatives: Soyuz PPK

Soyuz P (Russian: Союз Перехватчик meaning Union Interceptor) also known as 11F71 or 7K-P, was a proposed Soviet crewed combat spacecraft and satellite interceptor. The Soyuz P was proposed in December 1962, along with other Soyuz variants to match the United States' Manned Orbiting Laboratory program. Active development of the Soyuz P began in 1964.

The Soyuz P was intended to rendezvous with the target, and would have been followed by an EVA by a cosmonaut to inspect the satellite. Depending on the results of the inspection or the objectives of the mission, the satellite would have either re-entered with the Soyuz P to be studied on Earth, or would have been neutralized. However, this would have been risky to the cosmonaut as some satellites are fitted with automated destruction systems to prevent them from falling into enemy hands.

In January 1964, the program was put on hold due to the military's growing interest in uncrewed anti-satellite systems. In early 1965, Soyuz P was cancelled in favor of the Istrebitel Sputnikov program, which had achieved two successful space flights at the time. Another factor in the cancellation was the potential risk to the cosmonaut. A revised design of the Soyuz P was the Soyuz PPK.

== See also ==
- Soyuz programme
- Soyuz (spacecraft)
- Soyuz PPK
