= Bodeyevka =

Bodeyevka Бодеевка
- Selo
- Location within Voronezh Oblast Location within Russia
- Coordinates: 51°07′N 39°16′E
- Country: Russia
- Region: Voronezh Oblast
- District: Liskinsky District
- Time zone: UTC+3:00

Bodeyevka (Russian: Бодеевка) is a rural locality (a selo) and the administrative center of Bodeyevskoye Rural Settlement, Liskinsky District, Voronezh Oblast, Russia. The population was 603 as of 2010. There are 5 streets.

== Geography ==
Bodeyevka is located 32 km northwest of Liski (the district's administrative centre) by road. Novozadonsky is the nearest rural locality.
