= Liskinsky =

Liskinsky (masculine), Liskinskaya (feminine), or Liskinskoye (neuter) may refer to:

- Liskinsky District, a district of Voronezh Oblast, Russia
- Liskinskoye, a rural locality (a selo) in Voronezh Oblast, Russia
