= Priyar, Voronezh Oblast =

Priyar Прияр
- Khutor
- Location within Voronezh Oblast Location within Russia
- Coordinates: 50°47′N 39°51′E
- Country: Russia
- Region: Voronezh Oblast
- District: Liskinsky District
- Time zone: UTC+3:00

Priyar (Russian: Прияр) is a rural locality (a khutor) in Petropavlovskoye Rural Settlement, Liskinsky District, Voronezh Oblast, Russia. The population was 217 as of 2010. There are 3 streets.

== Geography ==
Priyar is located 54 km southeast of Liski (the district's administrative centre) by road. Vladimirovka is the nearest rural locality.
