= Divnogorye (khutor) =

Divnogorye Дивногорье
- Khutor
- Location within Voronezh Oblast Location within Russia
- Coordinates: 50°57′N 39°17′E
- Country: Russia
- Region: Voronezh Oblast
- District: Liskinsky District
- Time zone: UTC+3:00

Divnogorye (Russian: Дивногорье) is a rural locality (a khutor) in Selyavinskoye Rural Settlement, Liskinsky District, Voronezh Oblast, Russia. The population was 251 as of 2010. There are 6 streets.

== Geography ==
Divnogorye is located 44 km west of Liski (the district's administrative centre) by road. Peski-Kharkovskiye is the nearest rural locality.
