= Sredny Ikorets =

Sredny Ikorets Средний Икорец
- Selo
- Location within Voronezh Oblast Location within Russia
- Coordinates: 51°04′N 39°45′E
- Country: Russia
- Region: Voronezh Oblast
- District: Liskinsky District
- Time zone: UTC+3:00

Sredny Ikorets (Russian: Средний Икорец) is a rural locality (a selo) and the administrative center of Sredneikoretskoye Rural Settlement, Liskinsky District, Voronezh Oblast, Russia. The population was 4,411 (2021 census); and 4,946 as of 2010. There are 31 streets.

== Geography ==
Sredny Ikorets is located 24 km northeast of Liski (the district's administrative centre) by road. Peskovatka is the nearest rural locality.
