= Lugovoy, Liskinsky District, Voronezh Oblast =

Lugovoy Луговой
- Khutor
- Location within Voronezh Oblast Location within Russia
- Coordinates: 51°09′N 39°24′E
- Country: Russia
- Region: Voronezh Oblast
- District: Liskinsky District
- Time zone: UTC+3:00

Lugovoy (Russian: Луговой) is a rural locality (a khutor) in Pochepskoye Rural Settlement, Liskinsky District, Voronezh Oblast, Russia. The population was 295 as of 2010. There are 3 streets.

== Geography ==
Lugovoy is located 24 kilometres (15 mi) north of Liski (the district's administrative centre) by road. Davydovka is the nearest rural locality.
