= Mashkino =

Mashkino Машкино
- Selo
- Location within Voronezh Oblast Location within Russia
- Coordinates: 51°08′N 39°20′E
- Country: Russia
- Region: Voronezh Oblast
- District: Liskinsky District
- Time zone: UTC+3:00

Mashkino (Russian: Машкино) is a rural locality (a selo) in Bodeyevskoye Rural Settlement, Liskinsky District, Voronezh Oblast, Russia. The population was 173 as of 2010. There are 3 streets.

== Geography ==
Mashkino is located 29 km northwest of Liski (the district's administrative centre) by road. Drakino is the nearest rural locality.
