= Kolomytsevo, Voronezh Oblast =

Kolomytsevo Коломыцево
- Selo
- Location within Voronezh Oblast Location within Russia
- Coordinates: 50°52′N 39°31′E
- Country: Russia
- Region: Voronezh Oblast
- District: Liskinsky District
- Time zone: UTC+3:00

Kolomytsevo (Russian: Коломыцево) is a rural locality (a selo) and the administrative center of Kolomytsevskoye Rural Settlement, Liskinsky District, Voronezh Oblast, Russia. The population was 831 as of 2010. There are 12 streets.

== Geography ==
Kolomytsevo is located 18 km south of Liski (the district's administrative centre) by road. Popasnoye is the nearest rural locality.
