= Voznesenovka, Liskinsky District, Voronezh Oblast =

Voznesenovka Вознесеновка
- Selo
- Location within Voronezh Oblast Location within Russia
- Coordinates: 51°10′N 39°26′E
- Country: Russia
- Region: Voronezh Oblast
- District: Liskinsky District
- Time zone: UTC+3:00

Voznesenovka (Russian: Вознесеновка) is a rural locality (a selo) in Davydovskoye Urban Settlement, Liskinsky District, Voronezh Oblast, Russia. The population was 1,053 as of 2010. There are 7 streets.

== Geography ==
Voznesenovka is located 26 km north of Liski (the district's administrative centre) by road. Davydovka is the nearest rural locality.
