= Shchyuchye =

Shchyuchye Щучье
- Selo
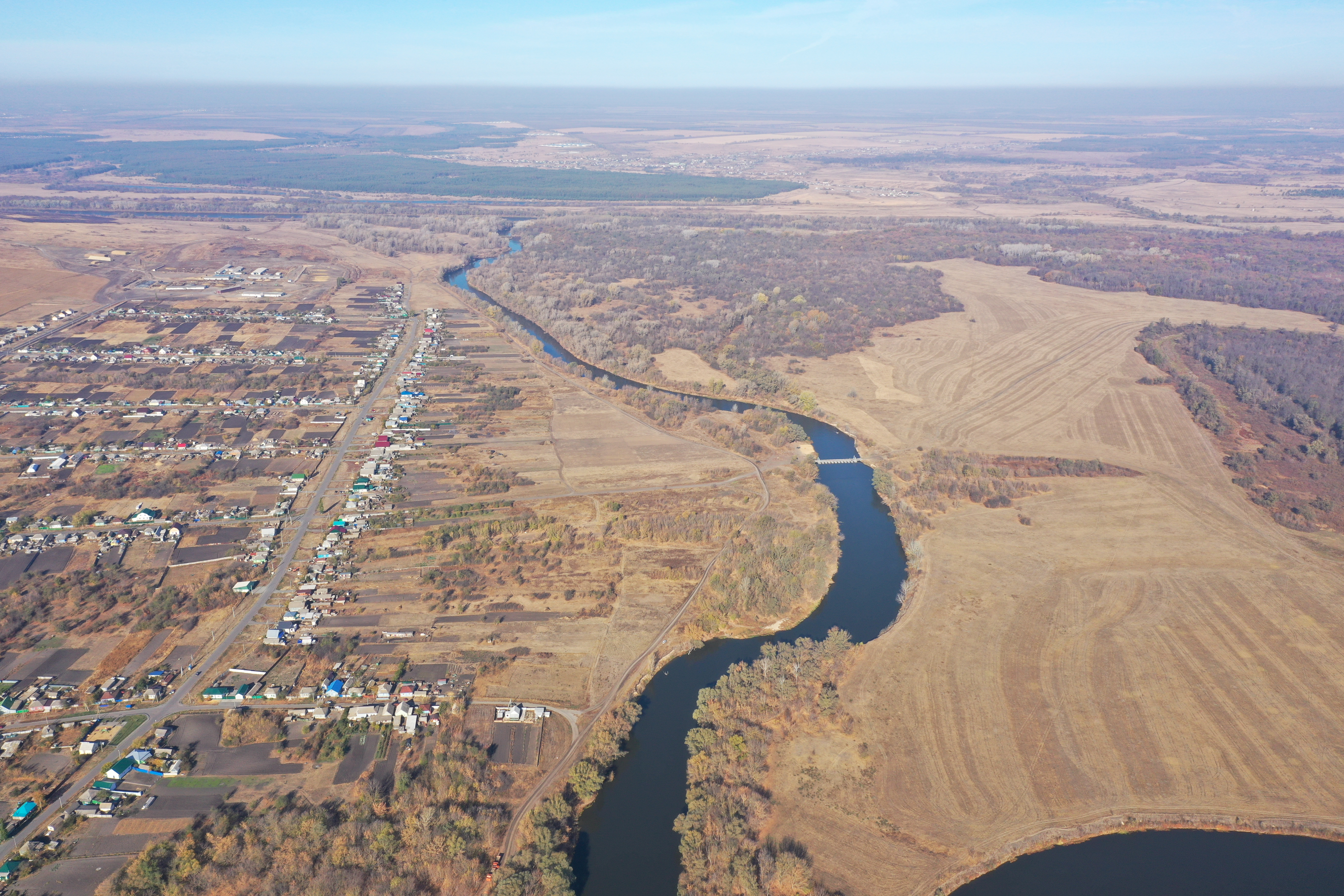

- Location within Voronezh Oblast Location within Russia
- Coordinates: 50°56′N 39°44′E
- Country: Russia
- Region: Voronezh Oblast
- District: Liskinsky District
- Time zone: UTC+3:00

Shchyuchye (Russian: Щучье) is a rural locality (a selo) and the administrative center of Shchyuchinskoye Rural Settlement, Liskinsky District, Voronezh Oblast, Russia. The population was 1,029 as of 2010. There are 11 streets.

== Geography ==
Shchyuchye is located 32 km southeast of Liski (the district's administrative centre) by road. Pereyezheye is the nearest rural locality.
