= Nizhny Ikorets =

Nizhny Ikorets Нижний Икорец
- Selo
- Location within Voronezh Oblast Location within Russia
- Coordinates: 50°58′N 39°42′E
- Country: Russia
- Region: Voronezh Oblast
- District: Liskinsky District
- Time zone: UTC+3:00

Nizhny Ikorets (Russian: Нижний Икорец) is a rural locality (a selo) and the administrative center of Nizhneikoretskoye Rural Settlement, Liskinsky District, Voronezh Oblast, Russia. The population was 1,696 as of 2010. There are 14 streets.

== Geography ==
Nizhny Ikorets is located 18 km east of Liski (the district's administrative centre) by road. Maslovka is the nearest rural locality.
