= Soyuz 7K-TM =

Variant of the 2nd-generation Soyuz spacecraft (1974–1976)

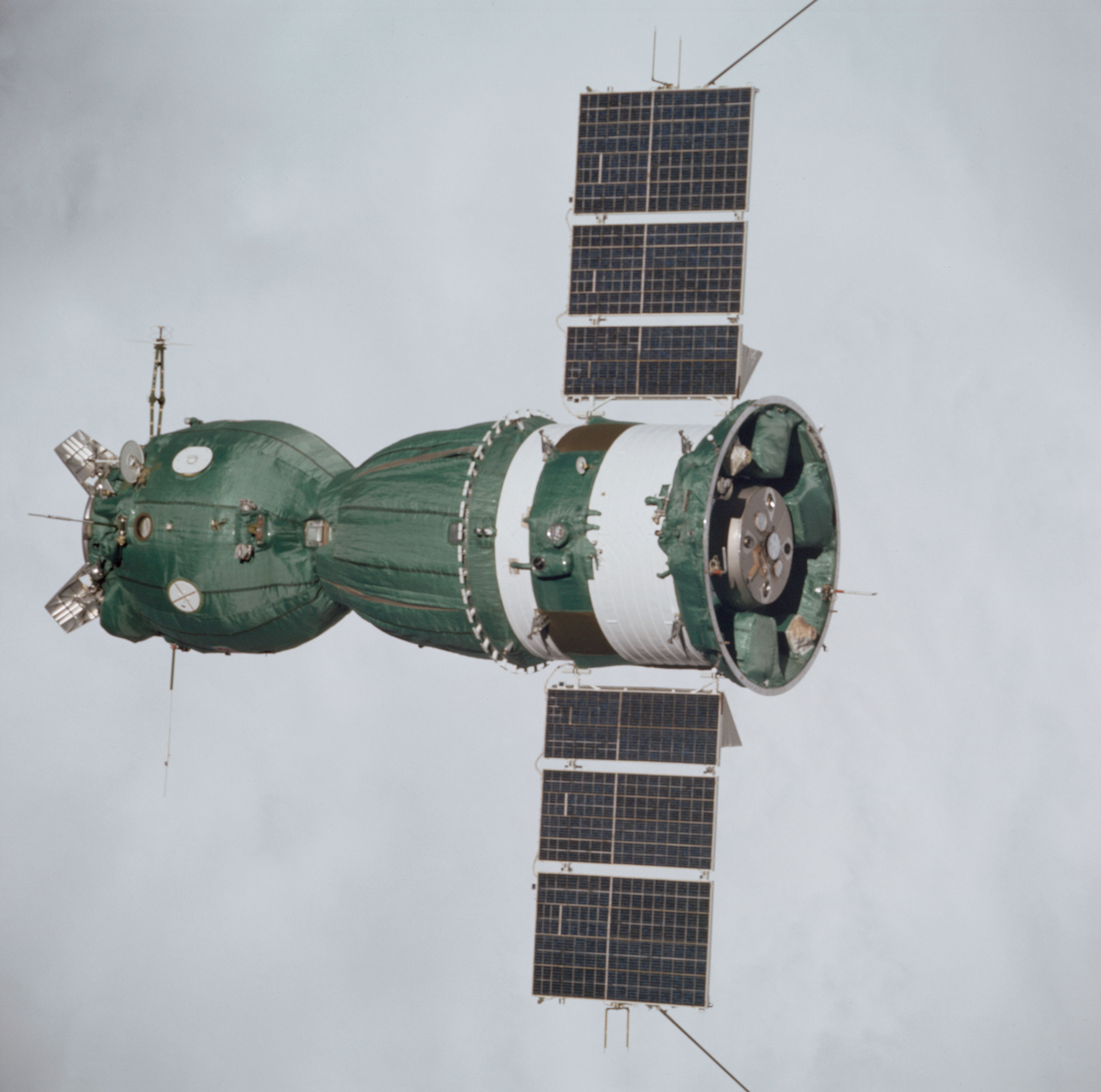
- Soyuz 19, a Soyuz 7K-TM spacecraft, during the Apollo–Soyuz Test Project (ASTP).
- Manufacturer: OKB-1
- Country of origin: Soviet Union
- Operator: Soviet space program
- Applications: Crewed spacecraft

Specifications
- Dimensions: Height 7.48 m (24.5 ft) Diameter 2.72 m (8 ft 11 in) Volume 9 m^{3} (320 cu ft)
- Regime: Low Earth

Production
- Status: Retired
- Launched: 5
- Retired: 5
- Maiden launch: 3 April 1974; Kosmos 638
- Last launch: 15 September 1976; Soyuz 22

Related spacecraft
- Derived from: Soyuz 7K-T
- Derivatives: Soyuz 7K-S; Soyuz 7K-ST; Soyuz 7K-MF6

The 1975 Apollo–Soyuz Test Project version of the Soyuz spacecraft (Soyuz 7K-TM) served as a technological bridge to the third generation Soyuz-T (T - транспортный, Transportnyi meaning transport) spacecraft (1976–1986).

The Soyuz ASTP spacecraft was designed for use during the Apollo Soyuz Test Project as Soyuz 19. It featured design changes to increase compatibility with the American craft. The Soyuz ASTP featured new solar panels for increased mission length, an APAS-75 docking mechanism instead of the standard male mechanism, and modifications to the environmental control system to lower the cabin pressure to 0.68 atmospheres (69 kPa) prior to docking with Apollo. The ASTP Soyuz backup craft flew as the Soyuz 22 mission, replacing the docking port with a camera.

== Missions ==
There are only five spaceflights of the Soyuz 7K-TM spacecraft, mostly in support for the joint US-Soviet Apollo–Soyuz mission. Excess hardware that flew on its final flight (Soyuz 22) were sometimes referred to its own unique configuration called the Soyuz 7K-MF6

Mission	Crew	Launch	Landing	Duration	Notes
Kosmos 638	None	3 Apr 1974	13 Apr 1974	10 days	First test flight of the APAS-75 docking system
Kosmos 672	None	12 Aug 1974	18 Aug 1974	6 days	Second test flight of the APAS-75 docking system
Soyuz 16	(Soviet Union) Anatoly Filipchenko (Soviet Union) Nikolai Rukavishnikov	2 Dec 1974	8 Dec 1974	6 days	Third and final dress rehearsal of testing the APAS-75 docking system for the subsequent ASTP mission
Soyuz 19	(Soviet Union) Alexei Leonov (Soviet Union) Valery Kubasov	15 Jul 1975	21 Jul 1975	6 days	Part of the Apollo–Soyuz Test Project, the first international crewed spaceflight in history
Soyuz 22	(Soviet Union) Valery Bykovsky (Soviet Union) Vladimir Aksyonov	15 Sept 1976	23 Sept 1976	8 days	Earth sciences and (possibly a) reconnaissance mission. Final crewed Soyuz spaceflight to not visit a space station

== Images ==
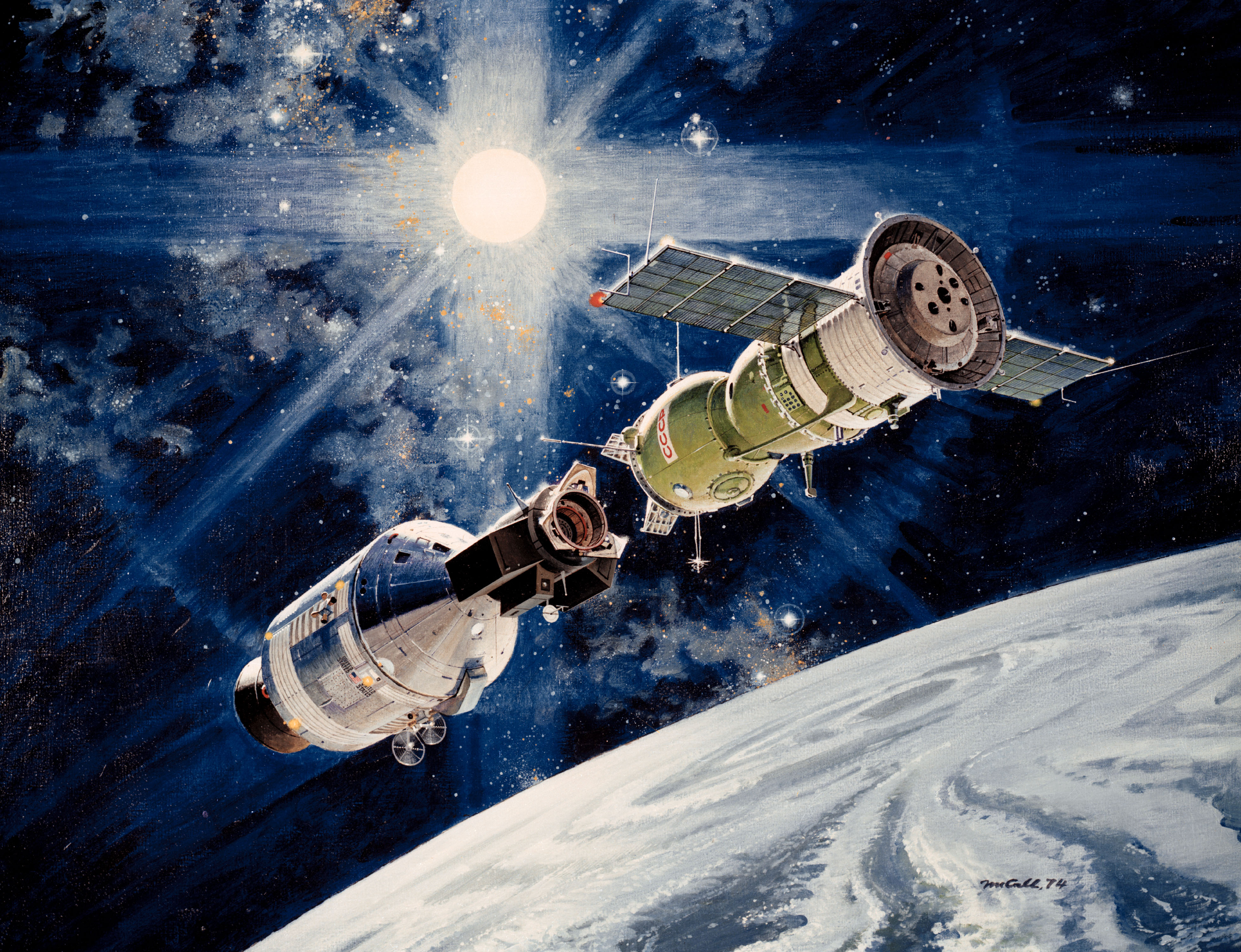

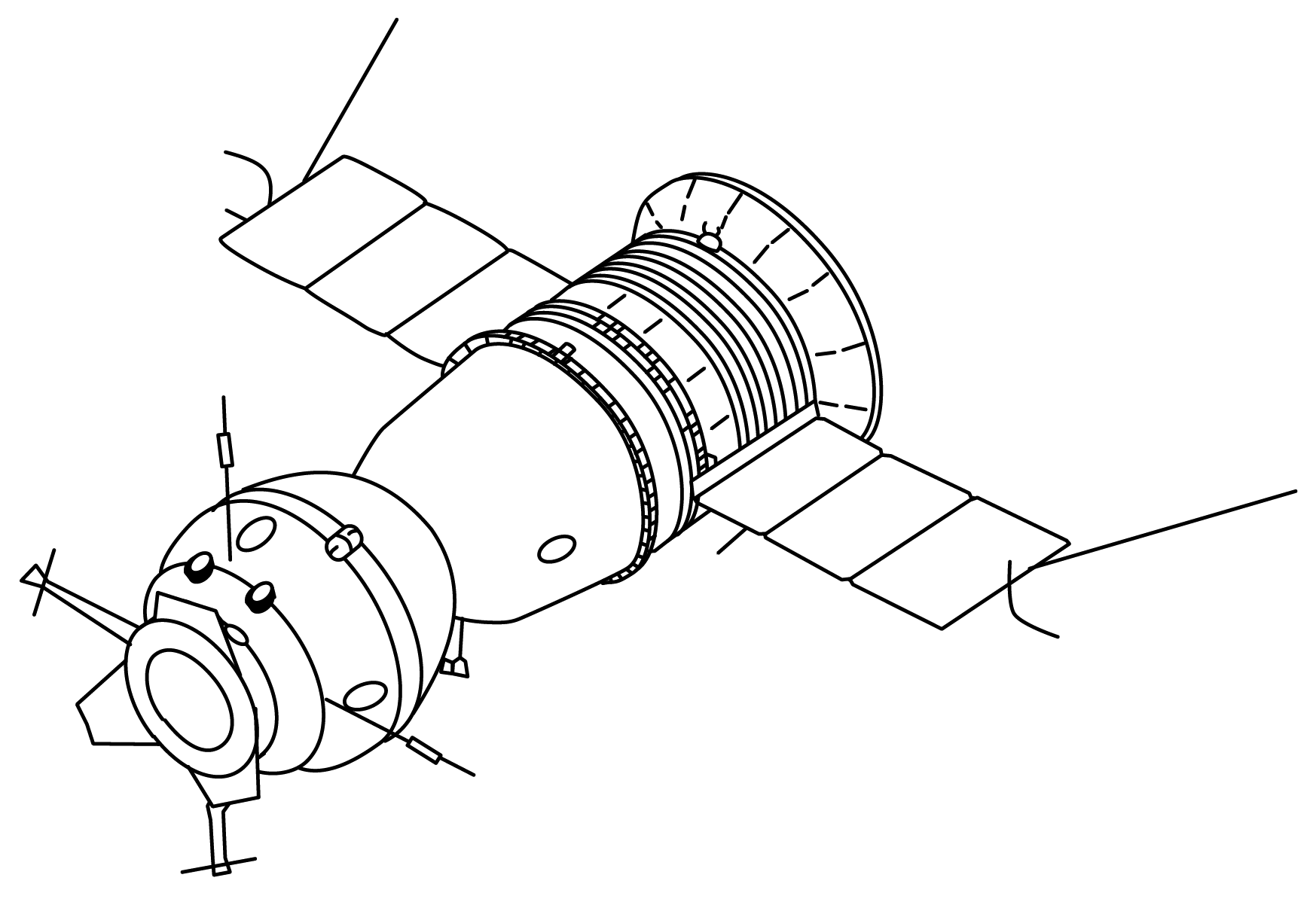

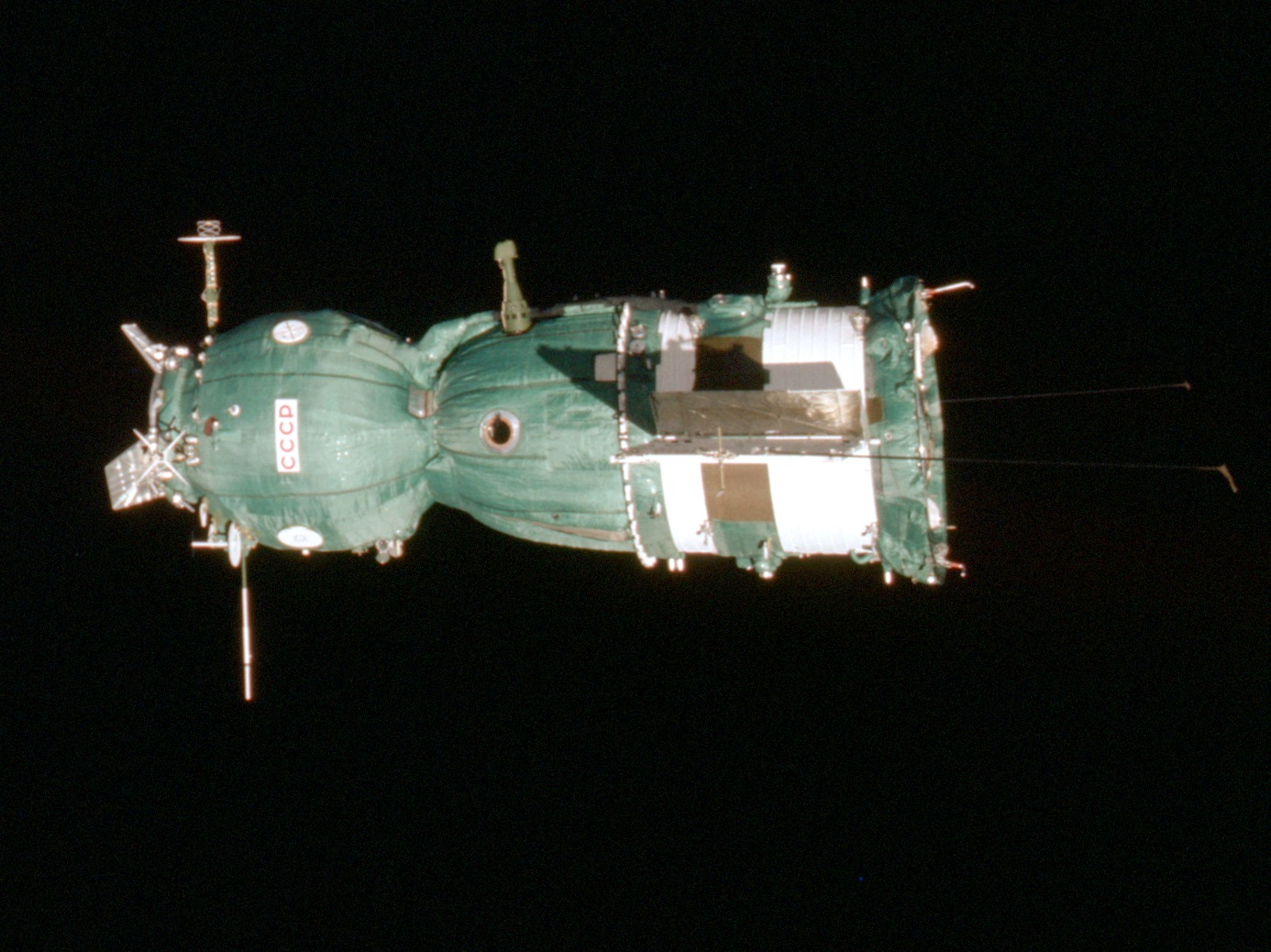

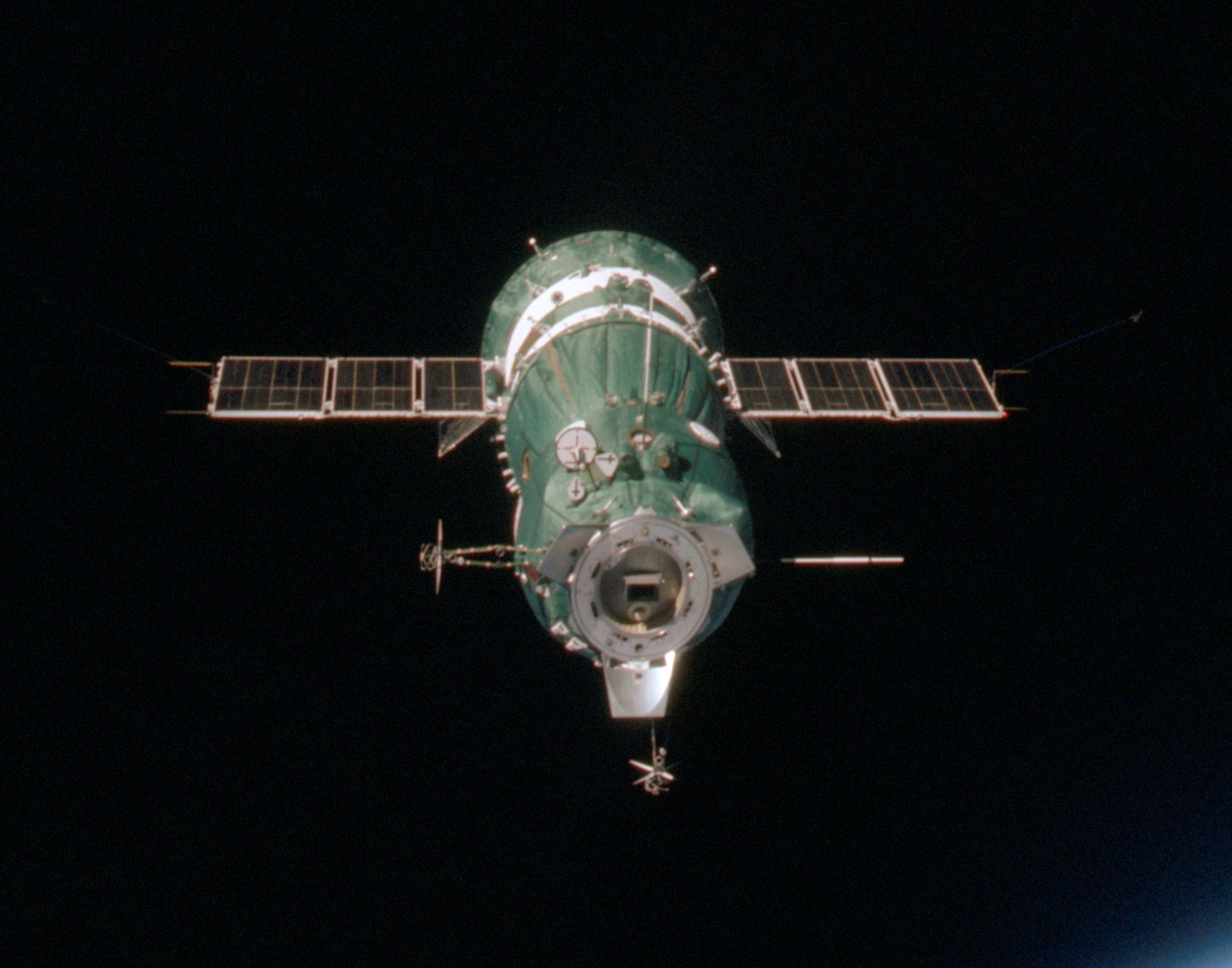

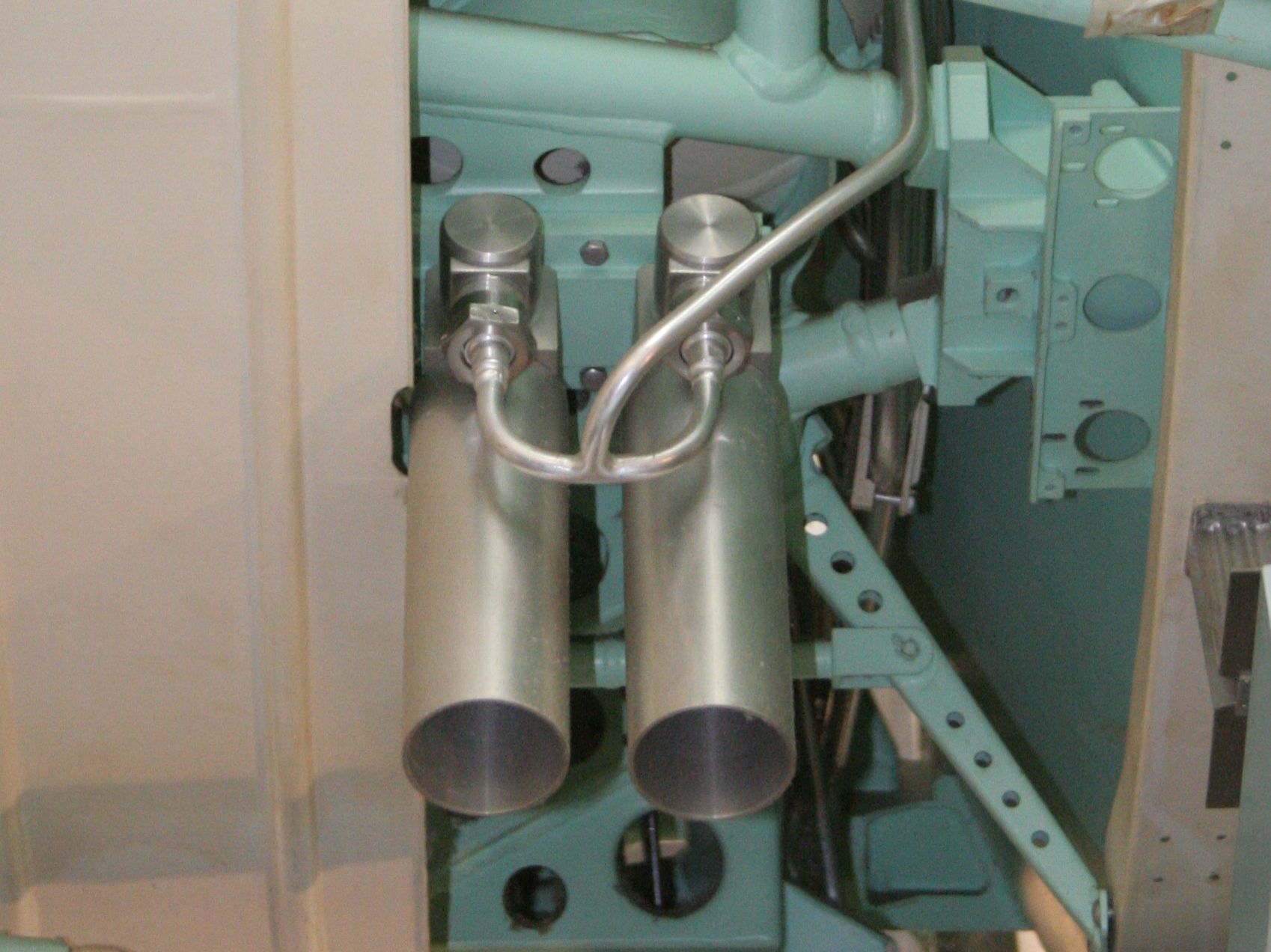

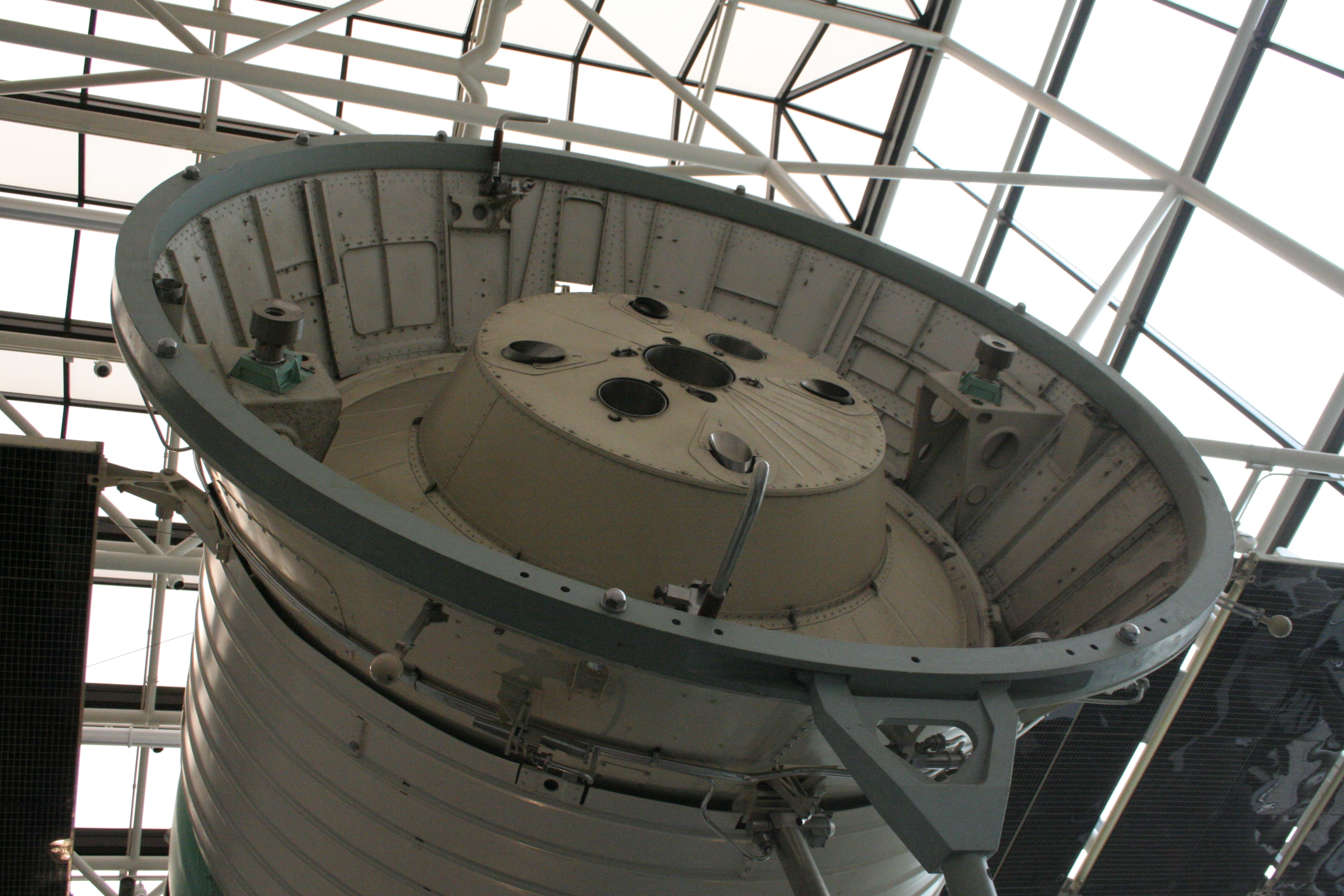

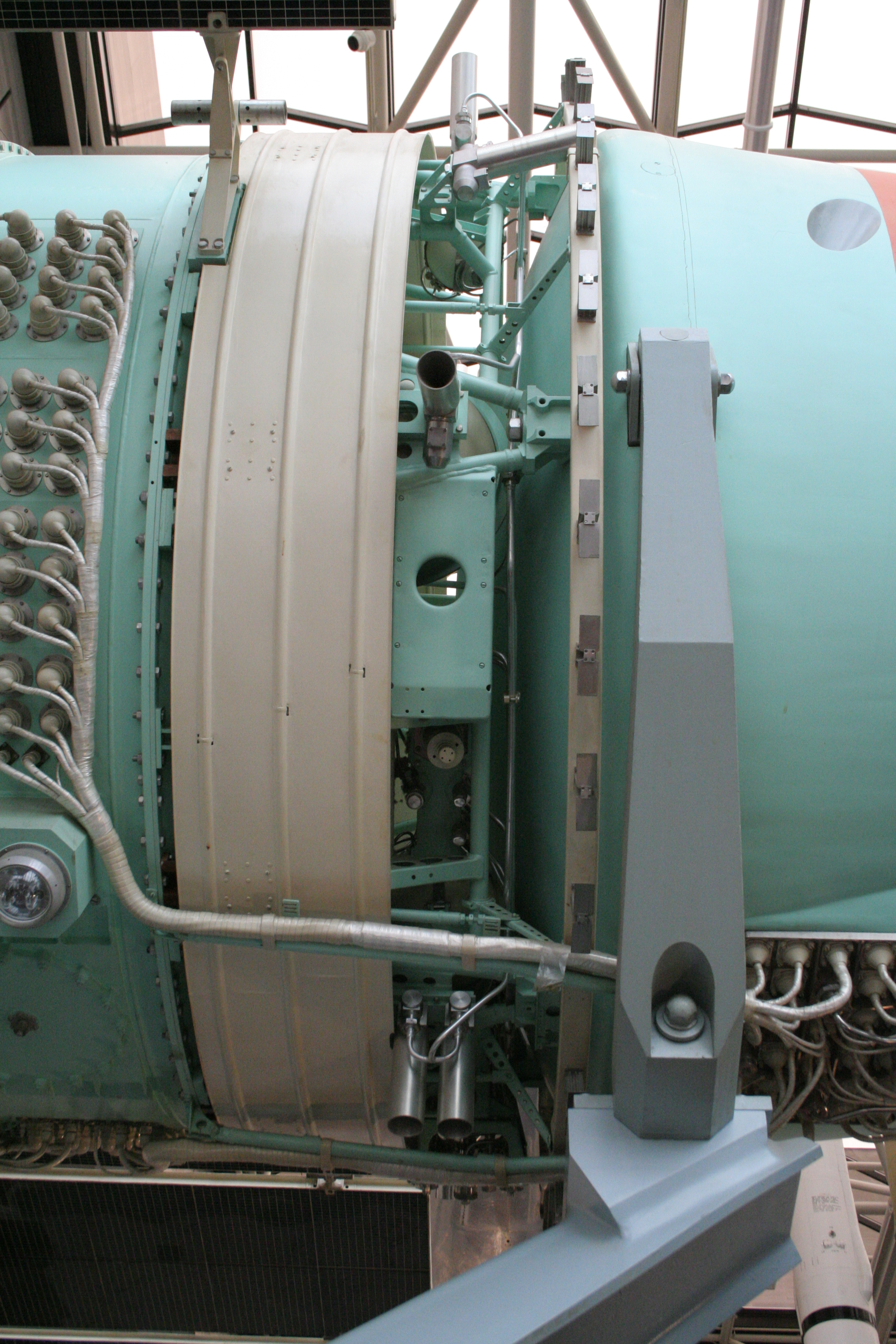

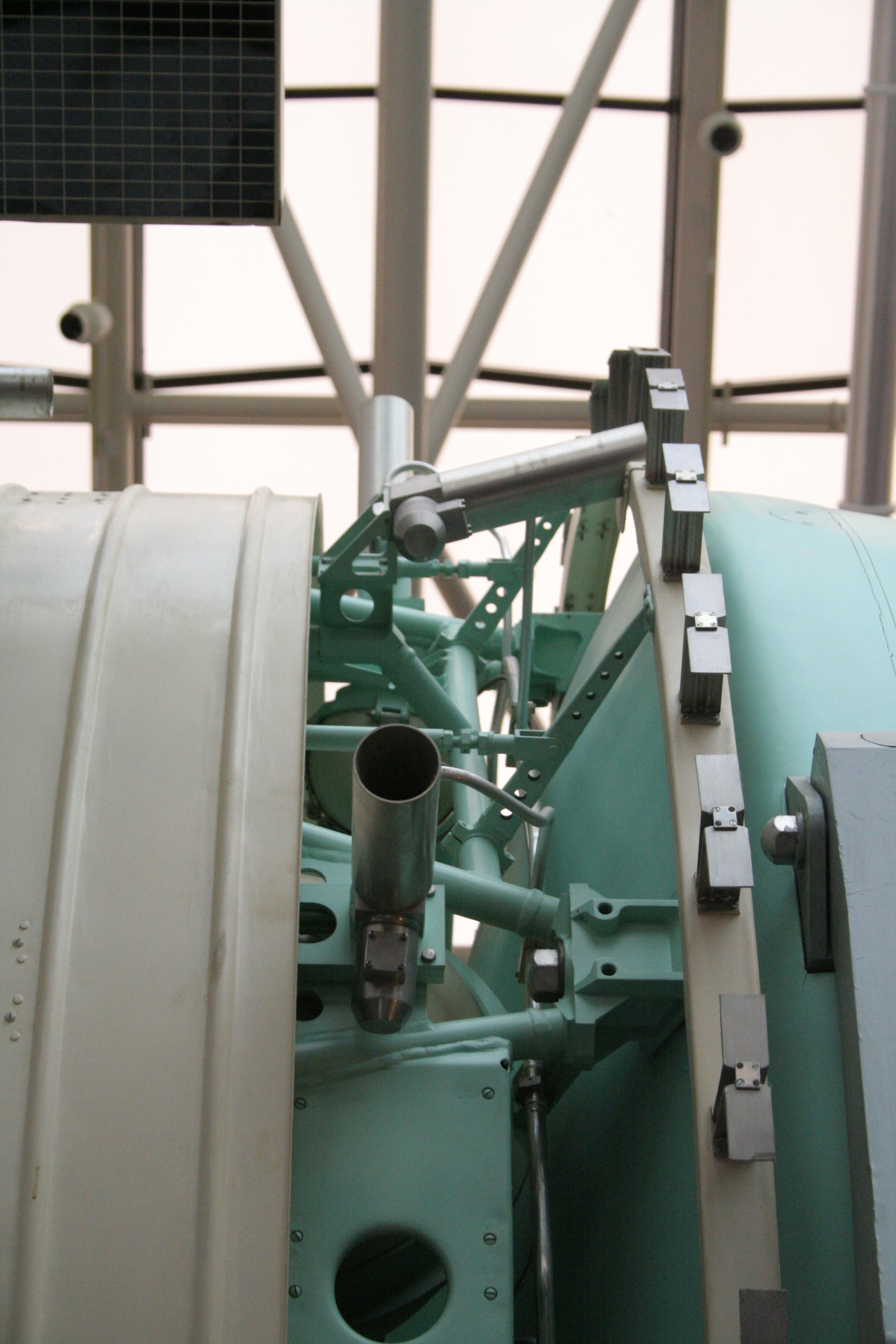

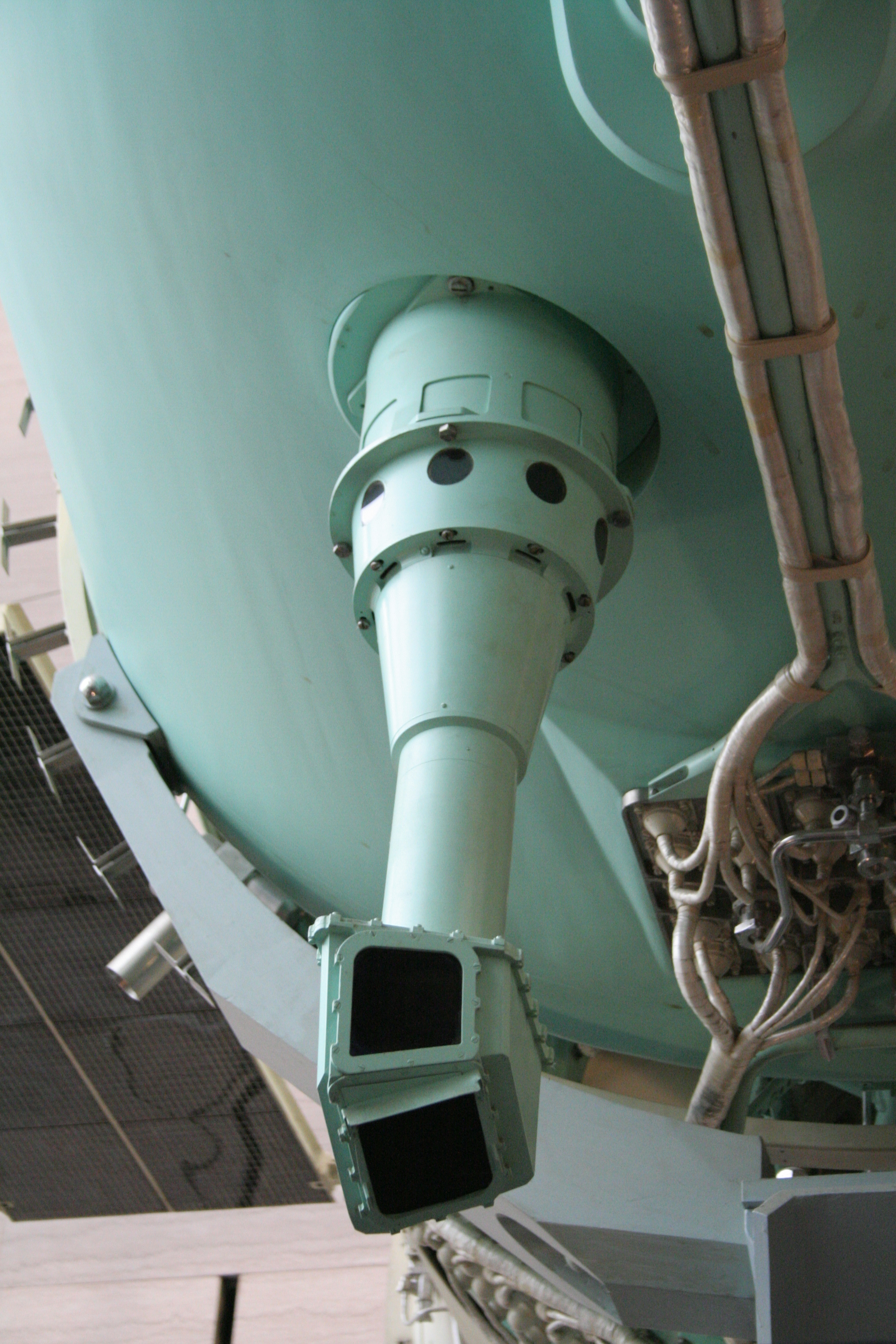
