= Kolybelka =

Kolybelka Колыбелка
- Selo
- Location within Voronezh Oblast Location within Russia
- Coordinates: 50°50′N 39°49′E
- Country: Russia
- Region: Voronezh Oblast
- District: Liskinsky District
- Time zone: UTC+3:00

Kolybelka (Russian: Колыбелка) is a rural locality (a selo) and the administrative center of Kolybelskoye Rural Settlement, Liskinsky District, Voronezh Oblast, Russia. The population was 1,309 as of 2010. There are 9 streets.

== Geography ==
Kolybelka is located 42 km southeast of Liski (the district's administrative centre) by road. Petropavlovka is the nearest rural locality.
