= Yermolovka =

Yermolovka may refer to:

- Yermolovka, Voronezh Oblast
- Yermolovka, Republic of Tatarstan, a village in the Republic of Tatarstan, Russia
- Yermolovka, name of several other rural localities in Russia
