= Liskinskoye =

Liskinskoye Лискинское
- Selo
- Location within Voronezh Oblast Location within Russia
- Coordinates: 51°01′N 39°32′E
- Country: Russia
- Region: Voronezh Oblast
- District: Liskinsky District
- Time zone: UTC+3:00

Liskinskoye (Russian: Лискинское) is a rural locality (a selo) and the administrative center of Krasnoznamenskoye Rural Settlement, Liskinsky District, Voronezh Oblast, Russia. The population was 1,505 as of 2010. There are 19 streets.

== Geography ==
Liskinskoye is located 9 km northeast of Liski (the district's administrative centre) by road. Liskinskoye 2-ye otdeleniye is the nearest rural locality.
