= Yermolovka, Voronezh Oblast =

Yermolovka Ермоловка
- Selo
- Location within Voronezh Oblast Location within Russia
- Coordinates: 51°11′N 39°26′E
- Country: Russia
- Region: Voronezh Oblast
- District: Liskinsky District
- Time zone: UTC+3:00

Yermolovka (Russian: Ермоловка) is a rural locality (a selo) in Pochepskoye Rural Settlement, Liskinsky District, Voronezh Oblast, Russia. The population was 689 as of 2010. There are 7 streets.

== Geography ==
Yermolovka is located 27 km north of Liski (the district's administrative centre) by road. Voznesenovka is the nearest rural locality.
