= Androgynous Peripheral Attach System =

Spacecraft docking mechanism

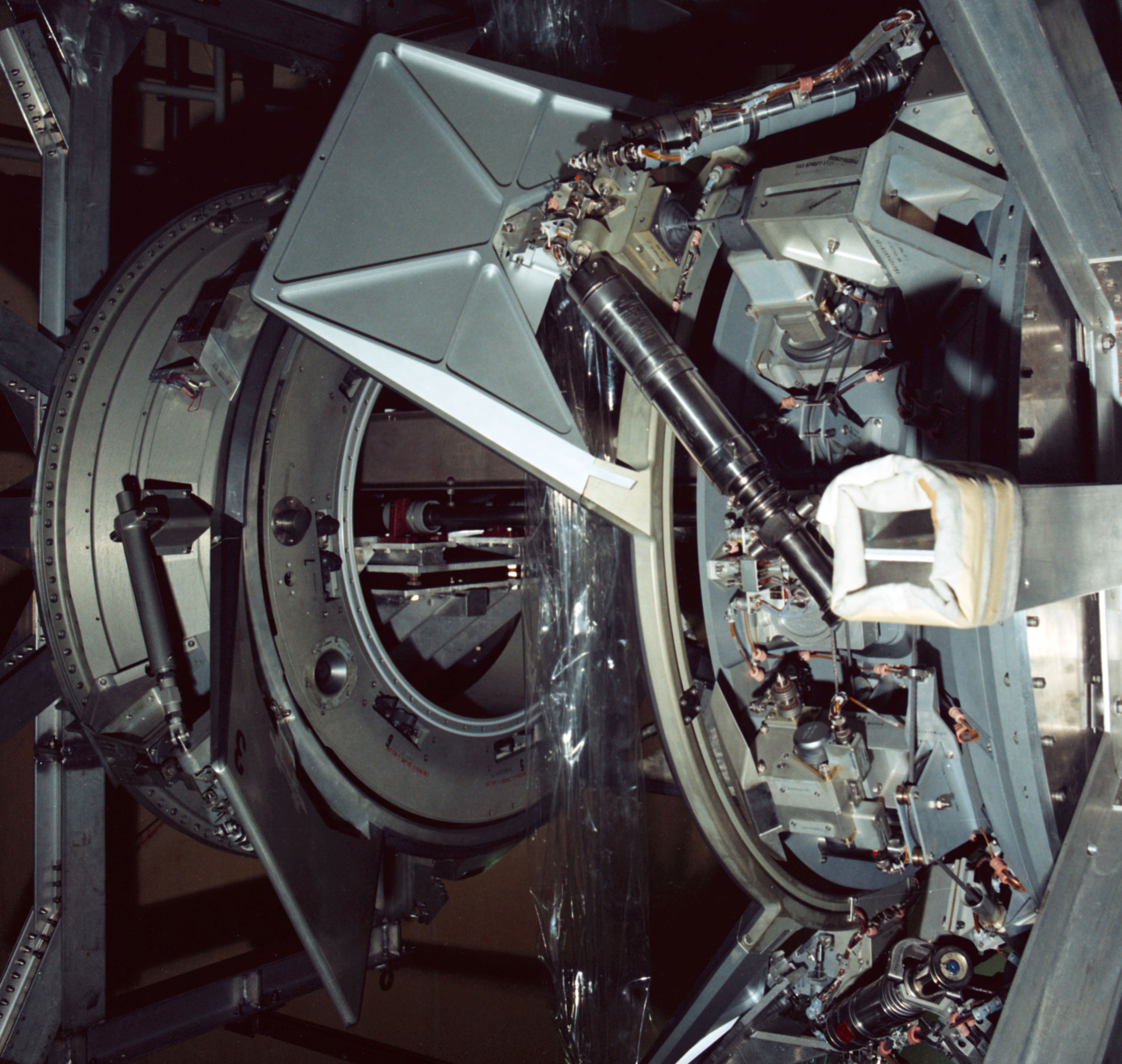
- APAS-75 (American version)
- Type: androgynous docking mechanism
- Developer: RKK Energiya
- Mass: 286 kg (631 lb)
- Host spacecraft: Soyuz; Space Shuttle; Mir; ISS
- First use: 1975
- Last use: 2011

The terms Androgynous Peripheral Attach System (APAS), Androgynous Peripheral Assembly System (APAS) and Androgynous Peripheral Docking System (APDS) are used interchangeably to describe a Russian family of spacecraft docking mechanisms, and are also sometimes used as generic names for any docking system in that family. A Chinese system similar to APAS-89/95 is used by the Shenzhou spacecraft.

== Overview ==
The name of the system is Russian in origin, and is an acronym, АПАС, in the Cyrillic alphabet, from the Russian Андрогинно-периферийный агрегат стыковки (Androginno-periferiynyy agregat stykovki). The English acronym was designed to be just the same letters but in the Latin alphabet, for which the first two words are direct counterparts of those in the original. The third word in Russian comes from the German Aggregat, meaning "complicated mechanism", and the last means "docking". The last two words in the English name were picked to begin with the same equivalent letters as in the Russian name.

The idea behind the design is that unlike with the probe-and-drogue docking system, any APAS docking ring can mate with any other APAS docking ring; both sides are androgynous. In each docking there is an active and a passive side, but both sides can fulfill either role. There are three basic variations of the APAS.

The androgynous design also had a diplomatic motivation: neither the United States nor the Soviet Union was willing to be the passive ("female") partner in the docking. When American and Soviet engineers first met in Moscow on October 24 and 26, 1970, later referred to as the "Great October Revolution in the relationship between cosmonautics and astronautics," the Americans initially proposed a conventional docking arrangement, with "an Apollo-type receiving cone to be installed into the Soviet transfer tunnel," which the American engineer Caldwell Johnson illustrated with slides of a Gemini capsule docking in which "the active part is placed on the nosecone…This is the classic conception of the male and female part." The proposal was a non-starter, with Soviet engineer Vladimir Syromiatnikov remarking, "Our goal was to have a full-fledged and equal partnership." Johnson later quipped that neither country wanted to "play a female role in space before the eyes of the world."

== APAS-75 ==
Co-developed by American and Soviet engineers through a series of in-person meetings, letters and teleconferences, APAS-75 was initially planned to be used on an American mission to a Salyut space station which instead became Apollo–Soyuz. There were differences between the American and Soviet version of the docking mechanism, but they were still mechanically compatible. Early on, the Americans called the device both the International Rendezvous and Docking Mission (IRDM) Docking Mechanism and the International Docking System. The device is called the Androgynous Peripheral Docking System (APDS) in the NASA press packet for ASTP.

=== Design ===
Unlike previous docking systems, either APAS-75 unit could assume the active or passive role as required. For docking, the spade-shaped guides of the extended active unit (right) and the retracted passive unit (left) interacted for gross alignment. The ring holding the guides shifted to align the active unit latches with the passive unit catches. After these caught, shock absorbers dissipated residual impact energy in the American unit; mechanical attenuators served the same function on the Soviet side. The active unit then retracted to bring the docking collars together. Guides and sockets in the docking collars completed alignment. Four spring push rods drove the spacecraft apart at undocking.

The Americans selected North American Rockwell to construct seven docking mechanisms (two flight, four test, and one spare).

The Soviet Union built five Soyuz spacecraft that used APAS-75. The first three flew as test systems (Cosmos 638, Cosmos 672 and Soyuz 16). The fourth one was used for the Apollo-Soyuz Test Project, Soyuz 19 the only Soyuz to actually use the docking system, while the last APAS-75 fitted to Soyuz 22 was replaced by a camera prior to flight. On the American side the Apollo–Soyuz Docking Module carried one APAS-75 docking collar and one Apollo docking collar.

=== Development ===
In April 1970 NASA Administrator Thomas O. Paine suggested, in an informal meeting with Russian academician Anatoli Blagonravov in New York, that the two nations cooperate on astronaut safety, including compatible docking equipment on space stations and spacecraft to permit rescue operations in space emergencies.

Engineer Caldwell Johnson proposed a ring and cone system during a meeting in Moscow during October 1970. Boris N. Petrov rejected the simple adaptation of Apollo and Soyuz as a "space stunt" and had proposed developing a universal docking mechanism, Johnson suggested that the Manned Spacecraft Center (MSC) draw up a "design specifically adequate to requirements of a particular CSM/Salyut mission, the design being representative only of the fundamental form and function of docking gear satisfying the requirements for compatible docking system for future spacecraft."

During a meeting in Houston during June 1971, Soviet docking specialist Valentin N. Bobkov indicated that the Soviets also favored some version of the double ring and cone. Bobkov illustrated through sketches that the overall diameter of the docking system could not exceed 1.3 meters, because any larger system would require a change in the launch shroud. When Johnson raised the question of altering the shroud, the Soviets stressed the major impact that such a modification would have. In addition to having to design a new shroud, they would have to test out the launch aerodynamics of the altered hardware. The Americans had hoped to argue for a larger tunnel, but such a change appeared to be too great for their counterparts.

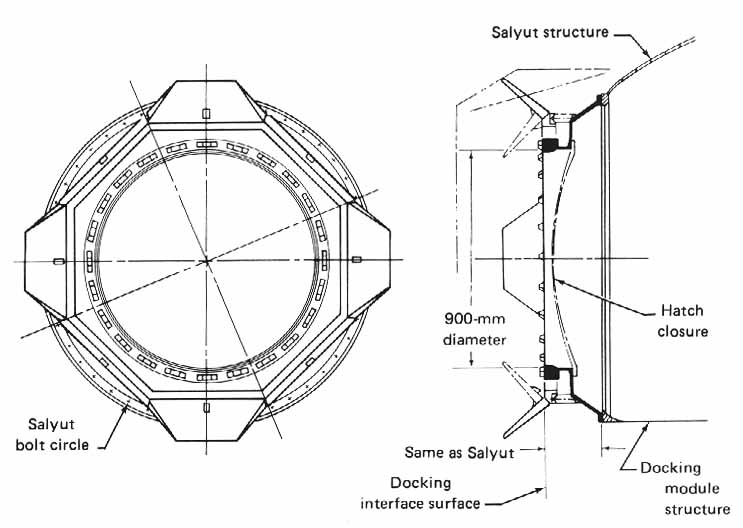
Drawing of a four-guide docking system that NASA proposed to the Soviets during a November 1971 meeting in Moscow

After the June meetings, Johnson had put Bill Creasy and his mechanical designers to work on the preliminary design of a docking mechanism. By the time the NASA delegation left for Moscow, Creasy's crew had designed and built a 1-meter double ring and cone docking system that had four guide fingers and attenuators on both rings, so either half could be active or passive during docking. The Structures and Mechanics Laboratory at MSC made 16-millimeter movies demonstrating this system in action, which Johnson took to Moscow in November, along with a booklet describing the system and a model of the capture latches. To Johnson's surprise, Vladimir Syromyatnikov had been working on a variation of NASA's ring and cone concept since the previous October. Instead of the four guide fingers in the American proposal, Syromyatnikov suggested three, and in lieu of hydraulic shock-absorbers, he proposed electromechanical attenuators. In essence, the Soviets had accepted the idea of using a set of intermeshing fingers to guide the two halves of the docking gear from the point of initial contact to capture. The concept of using shock absorbing attenuators on the active spacecraft's capture ring to buffer the impact of two spacecraft coming together was also acceptable. Both groups of engineers planned to retract the active half of the docking gear using an electrically powered winch to reel in a cable. Once retracted, structural or body latches would be engaged to lock the two ships together. Three basic issues had to be resolved — the number of guides, the type of attenuators, and the type of structural latches — before the design of a universal system could proceed.

Johnson, Creasy, and the other engineers in the Spacecraft Design Division had wanted to use four guides because they believed that it provided the best geometry when using hydraulic attenuators. As Bill Creasy subsequently explained it, the most probable failure situation using hydraulic attenuators would be a leak that would cause one shock absorber to collapse on impact. A study of various combinations had led the MSC specialists to conclude that four guides and eight shock absorbers was the optimum design. Creasy pointed out too that the most likely trouble with an electromechanical system would be a freeze-up or binding of one of the pairs of attenuators. Thus, the Soviets had sought to minimize the number of pairs in their system for the same reason that the Americans had preferred a larger number to limit the probability of something going wrong.

Since the United States had no significant engineering or hardware equity in its proposed design, and since the USSR had considerable equity in its proposed design, the Soviet design was selected as a baseline for the next phase of study.

By the end of the November–December meeting, the two teams had signed a set of minutes outlining the basic concept for a universal androgynous docking system. The formal statement read, "The design concept includes a ring equipped with guides and capture latches that were located on movable rods which serve as attenuators and retracting actuators, and a docking ring on which are located peripheral mating capture latches with a docking seal." Basic information on shapes and dimensions of the guides were also included in the minutes. They were to be solid and not rodlike; as first proposed by the Soviets, and three in number. As long as the requirement for absorbing docking forces was met, each side was free to execute the actual attenuator design as it best saw fit. The Soviets planned to use an electromechanical approach designed for the Soyuz docking probe, and the Americans proposed to stick with hydraulic shock absorbers similar to those used on the Apollo probe. This proposal also called for developing docking gear that could be used in either an active or passive mode; when one ship's system was active, the other would be passive.

Looking into the detailed design of the mechanism, the two sides had further agreed that the capture latches would follow the design developed at MSC and the structural latches and ring would follow the Soviet pattern. These paired sets of hooks had been successfully used on both Soyuz and Salyut. In addition, the group concurred on details regarding the alignment pins, spring thrusters (to assist in the separation of the spacecraft at undocking), and electrical connector locations. To evaluate the docking system concept and to ensure the establishment of compatibility at an early point in the development, the men planned to build a two-fifths-scale test model, the exact details of which would be decided at the next joint meeting.

Upon his return to Houston, Caldwell Johnson prepared a memorandum to document some of the informal understandings reached in Moscow. He indicated that this reflected "upon the manner in which the two countries will conduct and coordinate the next phase of the engineering studies of those systems ... The understandings ... were reached more often than not outside of formal meetings, and so are not likely otherwise to be reported." For example, in the area of hatch diameter, he noted that "it became apparent from the beginning ... that a hatch diameter greater than about 800 mm could not be incorporated into the Salyut spacecraft without great difficulty," but MSC had "long since reconciled itself" to a test hatch diameter of less than 1 meter. Johnson went on to comment that "the capture ring assembly had variously been called ring and cone, double ring and cone, and ring and fingers. It was agreed henceforth to call the capture ring 'ring' and the fingers 'guides.'"

Bill Creasy and several of his colleagues worked with Yevgeniy Gennadiyevich Bobrov at the drafting table to lay out these first Soviet-American engineering drawings. Larry Ratcliff drew the capture ring and guides on drafting paper, and Robert McElya supplied the details of the structural interface ring, while Bobrov prepared a similar drawing for the structural latches. T.O. Ross then took these drawings and conducted a dimensional analysis to be sure that all items were compatible. Agreement on technical specifications for the docking system cleared the way for NASA to begin discussions with Rockwell about building the docking system.

In April 1972, the Soviets informed NASA that they had chosen to use a Soyuz spacecraft in place of a Salyut space station for cost and technical reasons.

Final official approval of a joint docking mission came in Moscow on 24 May 1972. U.S. President Nixon and U.S.S.R. Premier Aleksey N. Kosygin signed the Agreement Concerning Cooperation in the Exploration and Use of Outer Space for Peaceful Purposes, including development of compatible spacecraft docking systems to improve safety of manned space flight and to make joint scientific experiments possible. The first flight to test the systems was to be in 1975, with modified Apollo and Soyuz spacecraft. Beyond this mission, future crewed spacecraft of the two nations were hoped to be able to dock with each other.

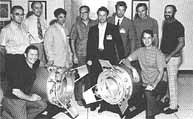
Scale prototypes were constructed to help assist in development

In July 1972, the group concentrated on spelling out more fully specifications for the docking system. Some refinements were made in the guides and other parts of the mechanism; as with the other groups, a schedule for the upcoming months was written, indicating documents to be prepared and tests to be conducted. After the team had a thorough look at the American two-fifths-scale docking system, which helped the designers discuss the operation of the mechanism and decide on refinements, they scheduled joint model tests for December. Then the engineers would be able to see just how the interfacing elements of one country's system mated with those of the other. The Soviets said they would draft the "Test Plan for Scale Models of Apollo/Soyuz Docking System" (IED 50003), while the Americans drew up the dimensions of the model and the test fixtures.

Under the direction of Syromyatnikov, the Soviet team had readied their documentation in both English and Russian and had prepared their two-fifths-scale model of the docking system for the joint meeting. Some of the Americans observed that while the U.S.S.R. mechanism was more complex mechanically than the American one, it was suitable for the mission and "sophisticated" in its execution. The two sides reviewed and signed the two-fifths-model test plan and scheduled the test for December in Moscow.

The Preliminary Systems Review (PSR) was planned to be a "formal configuration review ... initiated near the end of the conceptual phase, but prior to the start of detail design" work on the docking mechanism. As part of their presentation to the Preliminary Systems Review Board (the Board being the Technical Directors), Don Wade and Syromyatnikov included all the test data, specifications, and drawings for the docking system, as well as a design evaluation for the mechanism. After hearing their report, Lunney and Bushuyev felt three problem areas needed further study. First, the requirement for a spring thruster designed to help separate the two spacecraft had caught their attention, since the failure of this thruster to compress properly could prevent completion of docking. Second, Lunney and Bushuyev emphasized the importance of an indicator that would verify that the structural latches were properly in place. The American system provided information on the functioning of each latch but did not indicate that the interface seals were compressed, while the Soviet system gave data on compression of the seals but none for the latches. To assure the structural integrity of the transfer tunnel, it was important to know that all eight latches were closed. The third problem area was whether it was possible for the structural latches be inadvertently released. Bushuyev and Lunney called for a thorough re-evaluation of all these issues and advised the group to present their specific recommendations to them in December and January.

The group tests of the two-fifths-scale model and the second part of the Preliminary Systems Review for the docking system was the last joint activity scheduled for 1972. The Americans arrived in Moscow on December 6 and worked through December 15. Testing the scale models occurred at the Institute of Space Research in Moscow.

Tests of the full-scale Soviet and American docking systems began in Houston during October 1973.

== APAS-89 ==
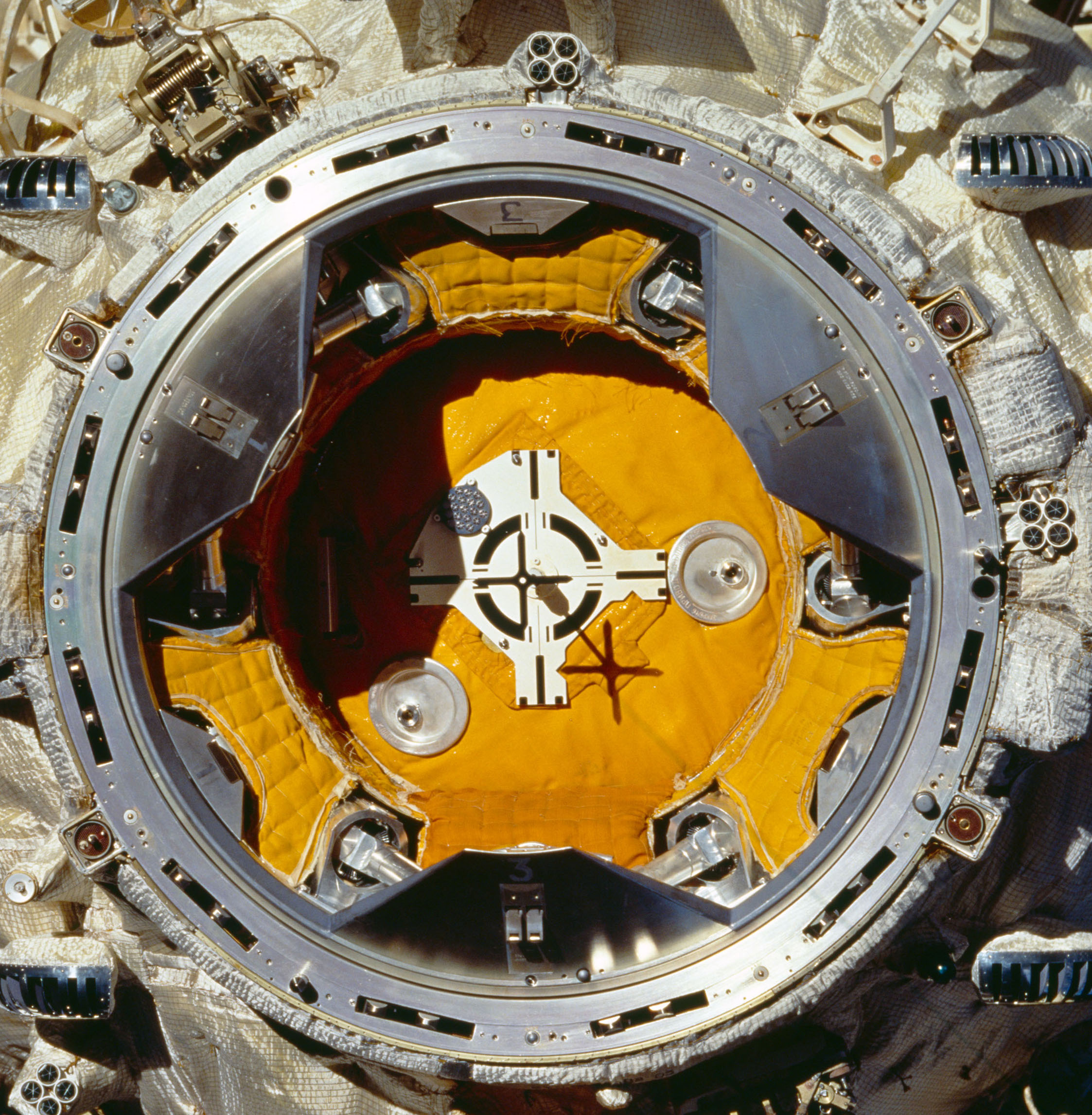
Passive

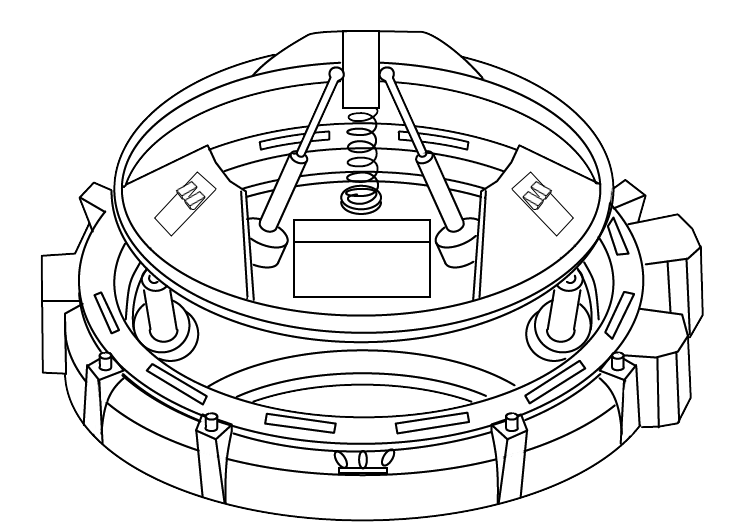
Active

When the USSR started working on Mir, they were also working on the Buran shuttle program. APAS-89 was envisioned to be the docking system for Buran with the Mir space station. The APAS-75 design was heavily modified. The outer diameter was reduced from 2030 mm to 1550 mm and the alignment petals were pointed inward instead of outward. This limited the internal passage diameter of the docking port to about 800 mm. The Buran shuttle was finally canceled in 1994 and never flew to the Mir space station, but Mir's Kristall module was outfitted with two APAS-89 docking mechanisms. The Mir Docking Module, basically a spacer module between Kristall and the Shuttle, also used APAS-89 on both sides.

== APAS-95 ==
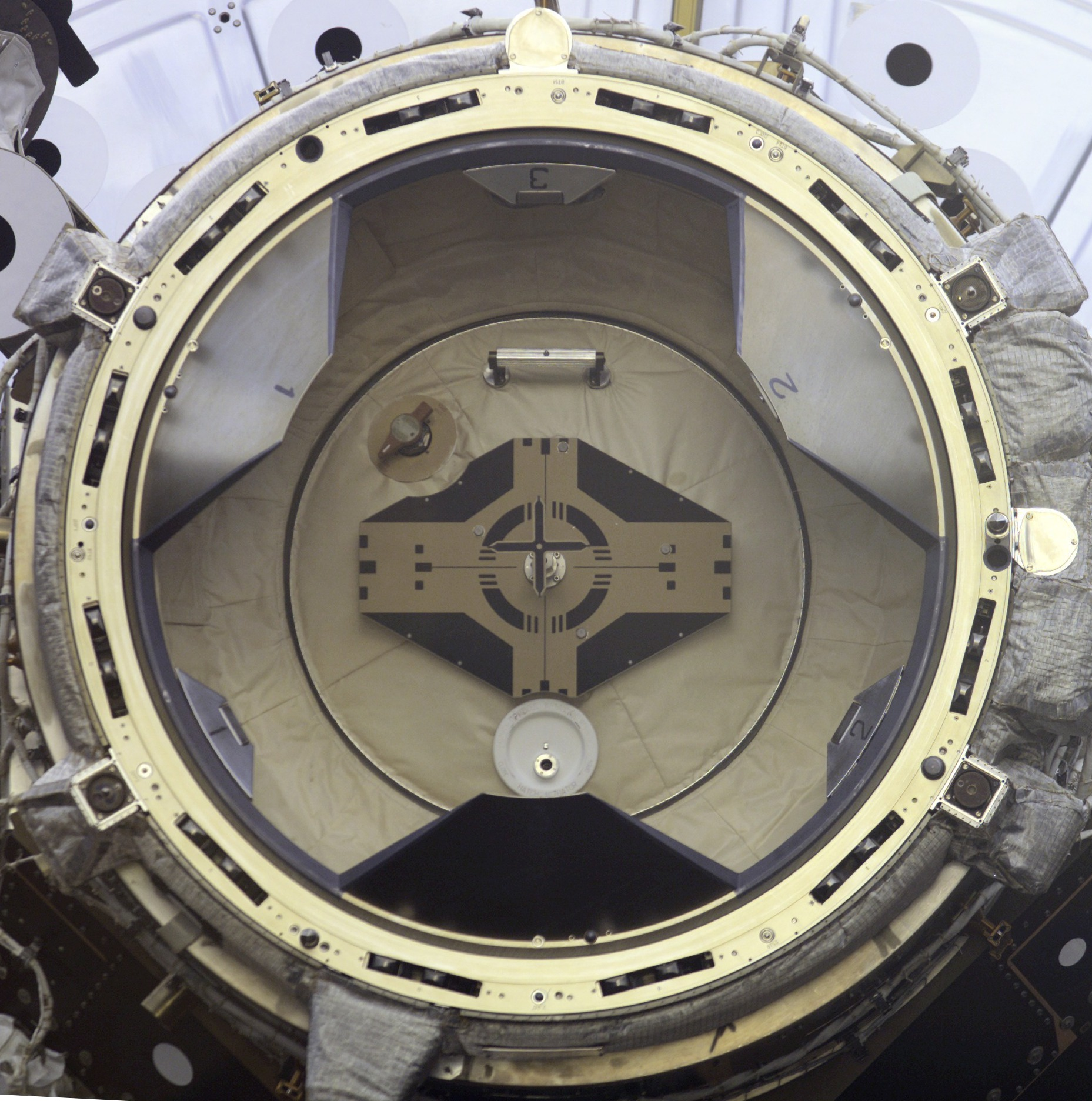
Passive (Note: The geometry of the mating and latching features are still androgynous, but this variant is intended to reduce docking impact with additional position control on one side. either side can still be used together with either side, but mating two active sides would be unnecessary.)

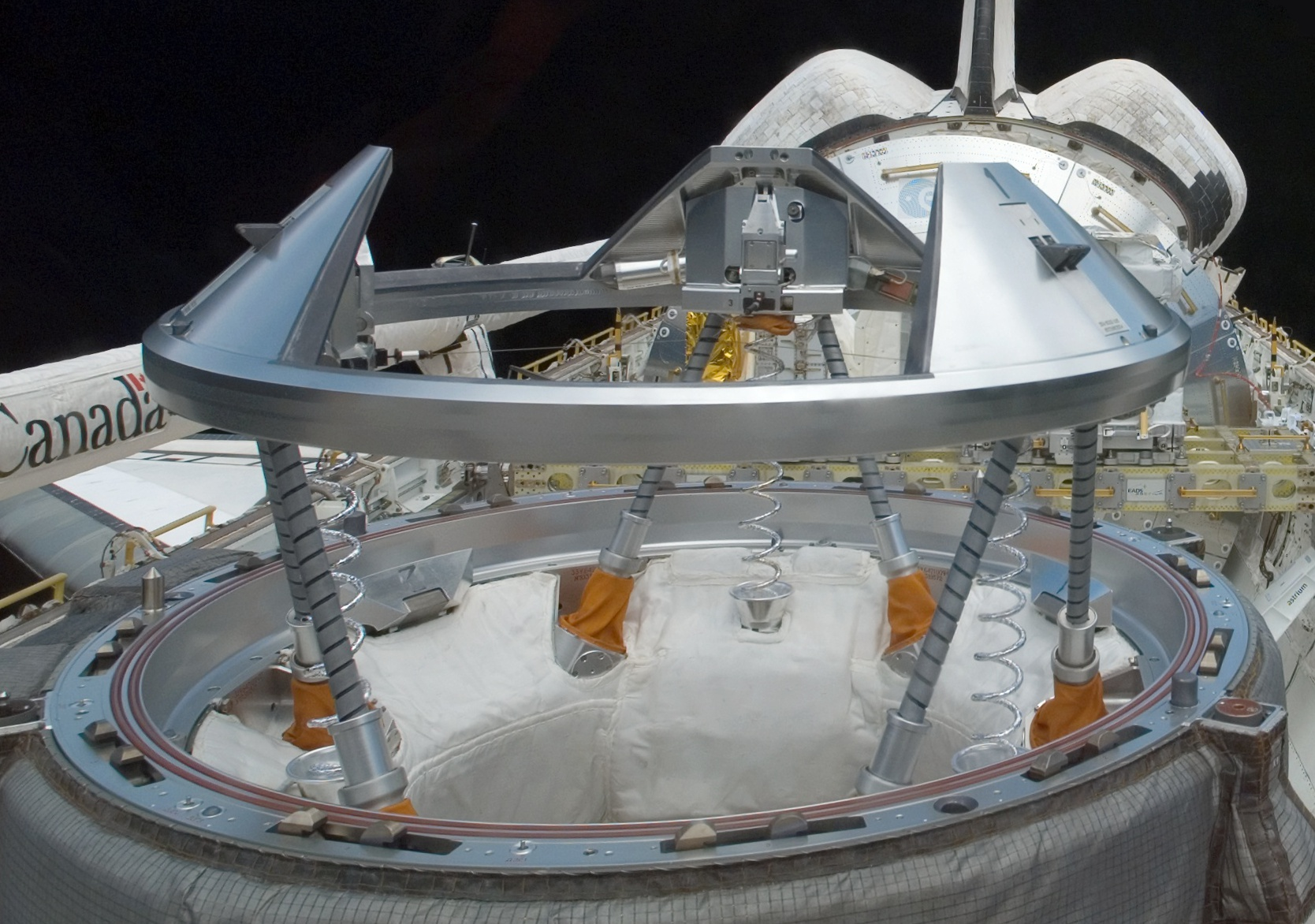
Active

APAS was selected for the Shuttle-Mir program and manufactured by Russian company RKK Energiya under an $18 million contract signed in June 1993. Rockwell International, prime contractor for the Shuttle, accepted delivery of hardware from Energiya in September 1994 and integrated it onto Space Shuttles' Orbiter Docking System, an add-on that was installed in the payload bay and was originally meant for use with Space Station Freedom.

Although Energia's code for the Shuttle APAS is APAS-95, it has been described as being basically the same as APAS-89. It had a mass of 286 kg.

APAS-95 was selected to join the American and Russian modules on the International Space Station (ISS) and to allow the Space Shuttle to dock. The Shuttle's Orbiter Docking System remained unchanged from when it was used for the Shuttle–Mir Program in 1995. The active capture ring that extends outward from the spacecraft captured the passive mating ring on the space station's APAS-95 connection on the Pressurized Mating Adapter. The capture ring aligned them, pulled them together and deployed 12 structural hooks, latching the two systems with an airtight seal. The Pressurized Mating Adapters are permanently passive.

== ASA-G/ASP-G ==
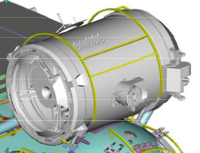
Passive (Note: The geometry of the berthing and latching features are non-androgynous.)

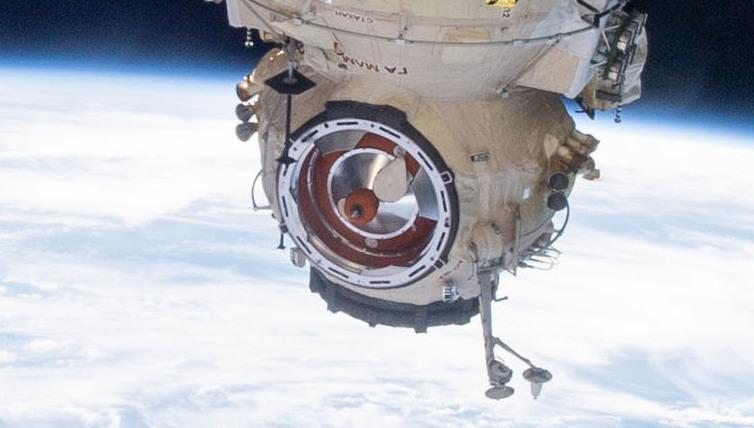
Active

The ASA-G is used only by the Nauka Science (or Experiment) Airlock to berth to the Nauka forward port on 4 May 2023, 01:00 UTC during VKD-57 spacewalk. The non-androgynous berthing mechanism is a unique hybrid derivative of the Russian APAS-89/APAS-95 system, as it has 4 petals instead of 3 along with 12 structural hooks and is a combination of an active "probe and drogue" soft-dock mechanism on port and passive target on airlock.

== Images ==
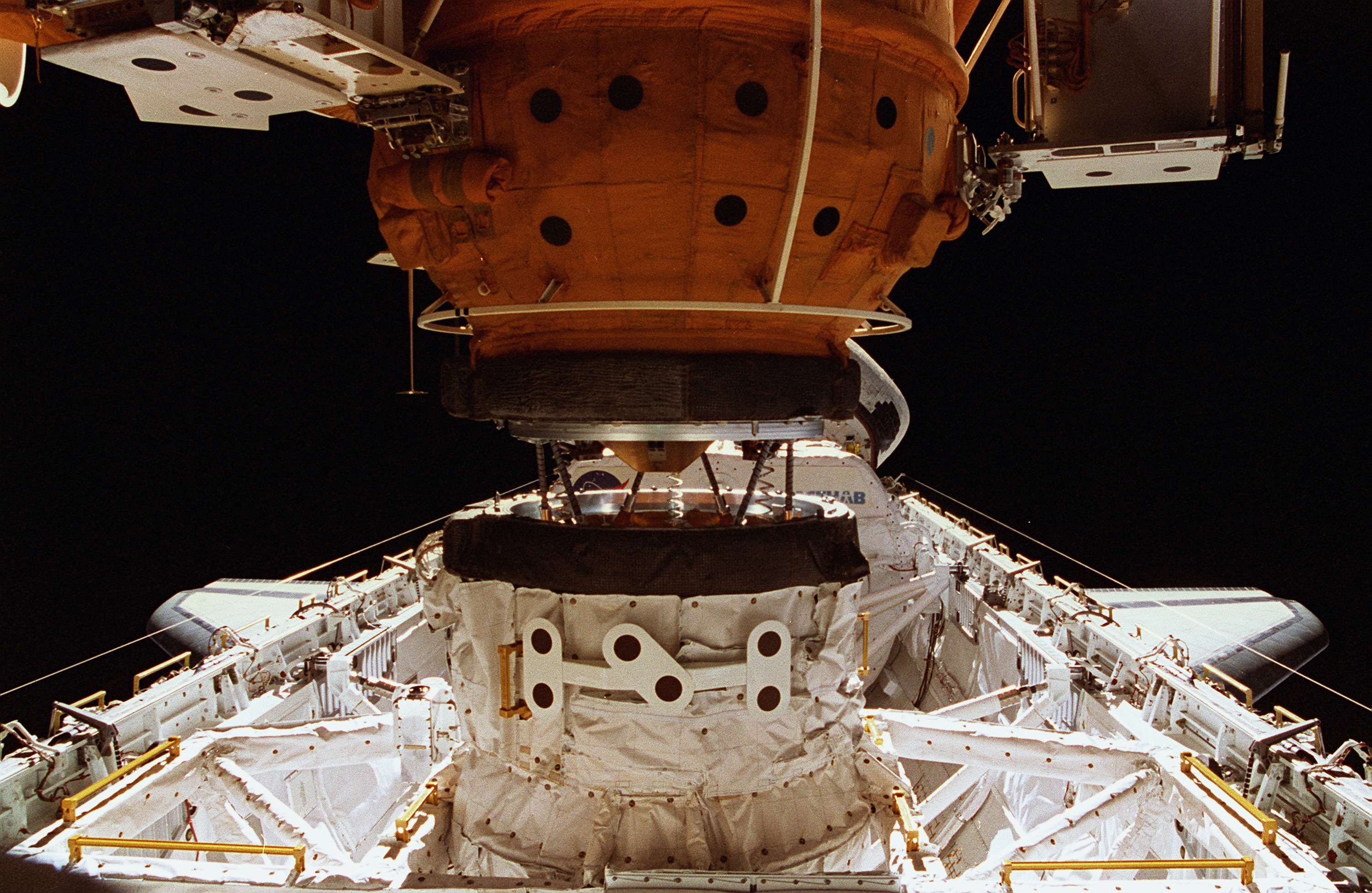
APAS in a Shuttle–Mir docking

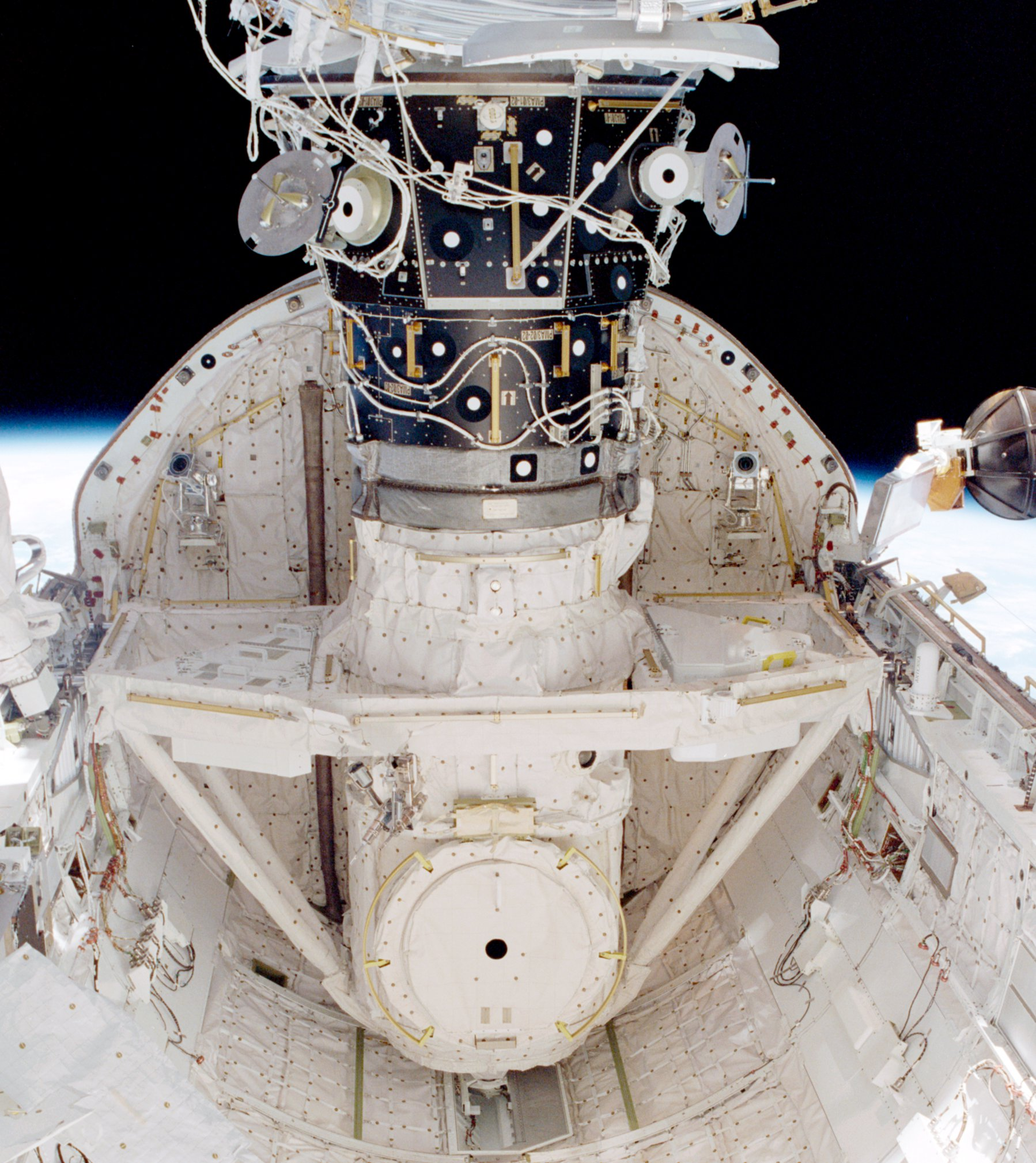
Orbiter Docking System (bottom, white), APAS-95 (middle, white/gray) and PMA-3 (top, black/grey)

== See also ==
- Space rendezvous
- International Docking System Standard
- NASA Docking System
