= Anatoly Filipchenko =

Soviet cosmonaut (1928–2022)

- Анатолій Філіпченко (Ukrainian); Анатолий Филипченко (Russian)
- Born: 26 February 1928; Davydovka, Voronezh Governorate, Russian SFSR, USSR
- Died: 7 August 2022 (aged 94)
- Occupation: Pilot
- Awards: Hero of the Soviet Union (twice)
- Space career

Cosmonaut
- Rank: Major General, Soviet Air Force
- Time in space: 10d 21h 03m
- Selection: Air Force Group 2
- Missions: Soyuz 7; Soyuz 16

Major General Anatoly Vasilyevich Filipchenko (Note: Ukrainian: Анатолій Васильович Філіпченко, Russian: Анатолий Васильевич Филипченко) (26 February 1928 – 7 August 2022) was a Soviet cosmonaut of Ukrainian descent. He flew on the Soyuz 7 and Soyuz 16 missions.

He was born in Davydovka, Voronezh Governorate, RSFSR. After leaving the space programme in 1982, Filipchenko became the deputy director of the OKB in Kharkiv. He died on 7 August 2022, at the age of 94. He was buried in the Federal Military Memorial Cemetery on 11 August 2022.

== Awards ==
- Hero of the Soviet Union
- Pilot-Cosmonaut of the USSR
- Order of Lenin
- Order of the Red Banner of Labour
- Medal "For Merit in Space Exploration"
- State Prize of the USSR
- Order of the Flag of the People's Republic of Hungary
- Order of the Banner of the Bulgarian People's Republic
- Medal "For the Strengthening Military Cooperation" (Czechoslovakia)
- Medal "Brotherhood in Arms" (GDR)
