= Kosmos 672 =

Unmanned test flight of the Soyuz 7K-TM spacecraft

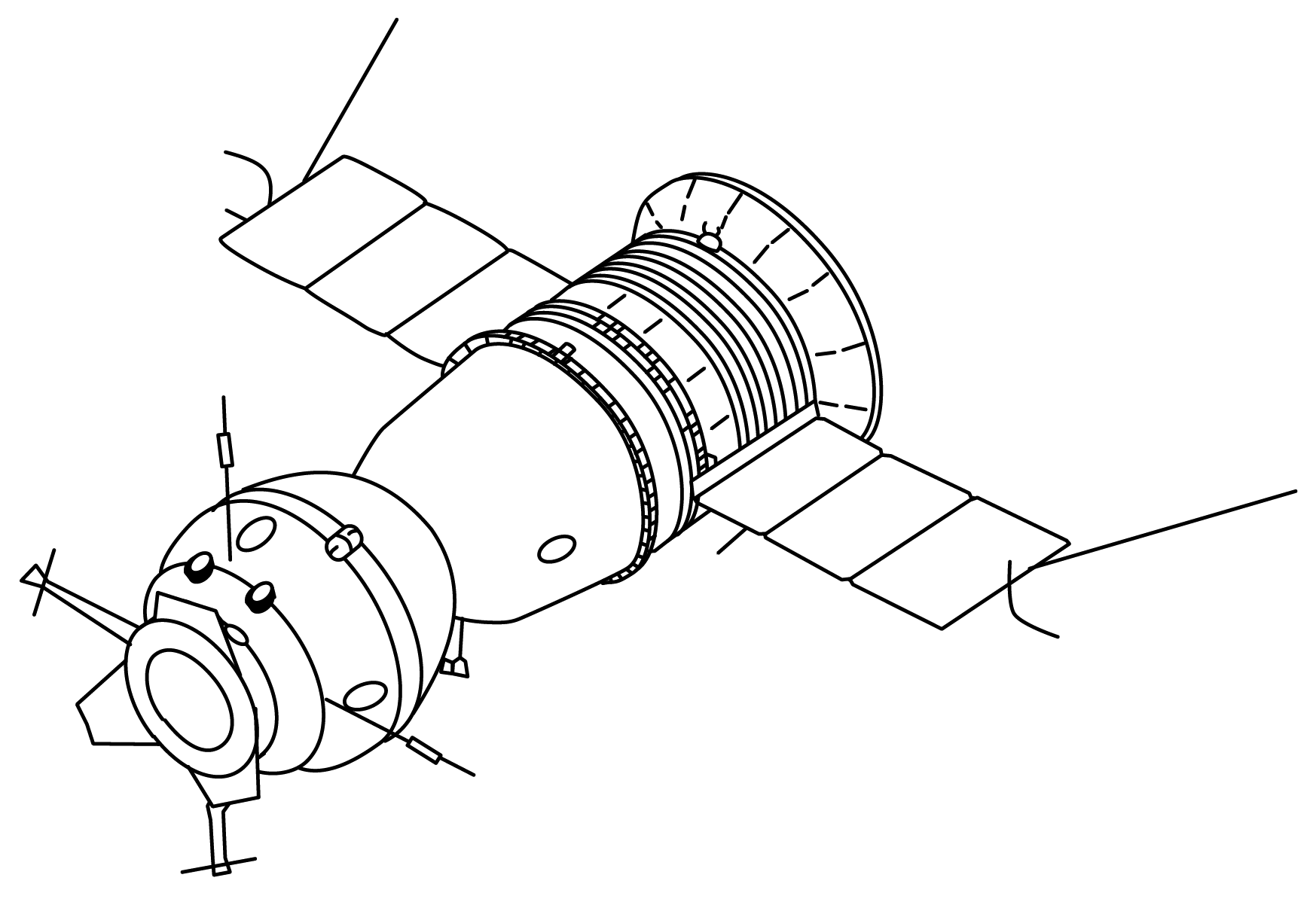
- Soyuz 7K-TM
- Mission type: Orbital test flight
- Operator: Soviet space program
- COSPAR ID: 1974-064A
- SATCAT no.: 7413
- Mission duration: 5 days, 22 hours and 37 minutes

Spacecraft properties
- Spacecraft: Soyuz 7K-TM s/n 72
- Manufacturer: NPO Energia
- Launch mass: 6,570 kg (14,480 lb)

Start of mission
- Launch date: 12 August 1974, 06:25 GMT
- Rocket: Soyuz-U
- Launch site: Baikonur 31/6

End of mission
- Disposal: Deorbited
- Landing date: 18 August 1974, 05:02 GMT

Orbital parameters
- Reference system: Geocentric
- Perigee altitude: 222 km (138 mi)
- Apogee altitude: 226 km (140 mi)
- Inclination: 51.7°
- Period: 88.9 min

Kosmos 672 (Russian: Космос 672 meaning Cosmos 672) was the second uncrewed test of the ASTP Soyuz spacecraft. Also had APAS-75 androgynous docking system.

This was preceded by another uncrewed test of this spacecraft type, Kosmos 638. It was a Soyuz 7K-TM spacecraft.

== Mission parameters ==
- Spacecraft: Soyuz 7K-TM
- Mass: 6510 to 6680 kg
- Crew: None
- Launched: August 12, 1974
- Landed: August 18, 1974

== See also ==
- Kosmos 638
- Soyuz 16
