= Davydovka =

Davydovka Давыдовка
- Urban-type settlement
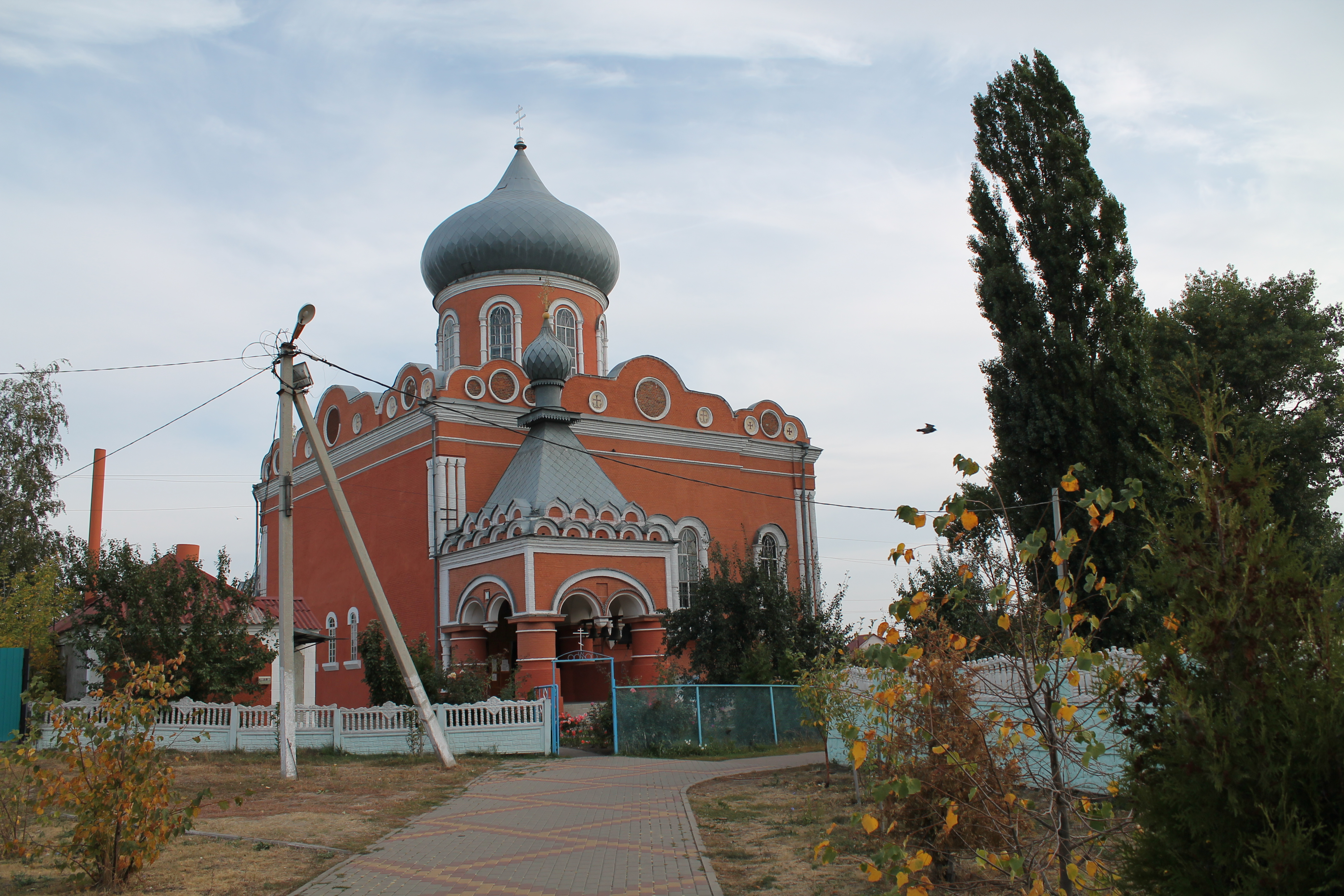
- Interactive map of Davydovka
- Location of Davydovka Davydovka (Voronezh Oblast)
- Coordinates: 51°09′28″N 39°25′45″E
- Country: Russia
- Federal subject: Voronezh Oblast
- Administrative district: Liskinsky District
- Founded: 1766

Population (2010 Census)
  - Total: 5,633
  - Estimate (2021): 5,167 (−8.3%)
- Time zone: UTC+3 (MSK)
- Postal code: 397940
- OKTMO ID: 20621160051

Davydovka (Russian: Давыдовка) is an urban locality (an urban-type settlement) in Liskinsky District of Voronezh Oblast, Russia. Population: 5,167 (2021 census); 5,633 (2010 census); 5,923 (2002 census); 6,207 (1989 Soviet census).
