= Kosmos 638 =

Unmanned test flight of the Soyuz 7K-TM spacecraft

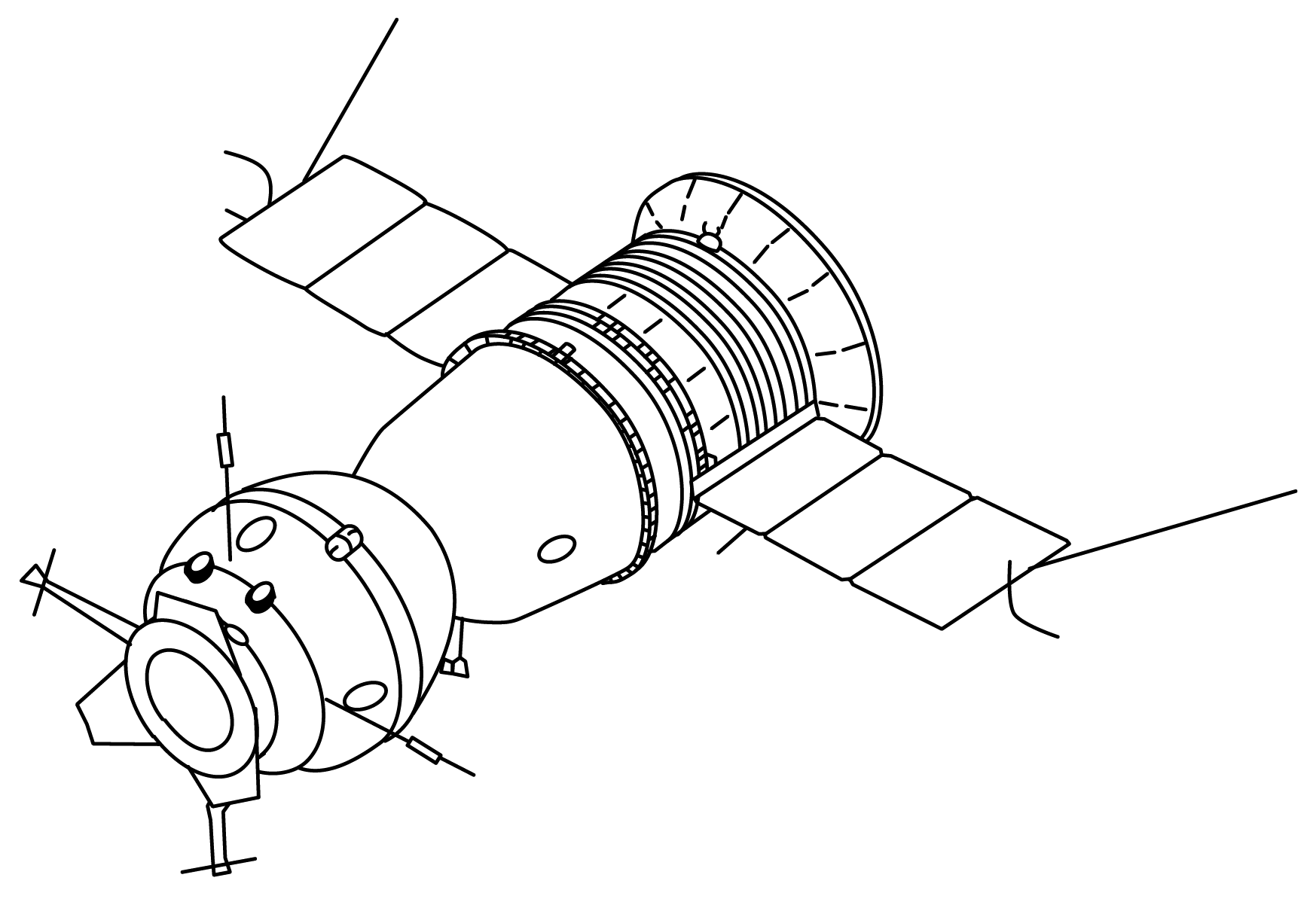
- Soyuz 7K-TM
- Mission type: Orbital test flight
- Operator: Soviet space program
- COSPAR ID: 1974-018A
- SATCAT no.: 7234
- Mission duration: 9 days, 21 hours and 35 minutes

Spacecraft properties
- Spacecraft: Soyuz 7K-TM s/n 71
- Manufacturer: NPO Energia
- Launch mass: 6,570 kg (14,480 lb)

Start of mission
- Launch date: 3 April 1974, 07:30 GMT
- Rocket: Soyuz-U
- Launch site: Baikonur 31/6

End of mission
- Disposal: Deorbited
- Landing date: 13 April 1974, 05:05 GMT

Orbital parameters
- Reference system: Geocentric
- Perigee altitude: 187 km (116 mi)
- Apogee altitude: 309 km (192 mi)
- Inclination: 51.8°
- Period: 89.4 min

Kosmos 638 (Russian: Космос 638) was an uncrewed test of the 1975 Apollo–Soyuz Test Project Soyuz. It carried an APAS-75 androgynous docking system.

This was followed by another uncrewed test of this spacecraft type, Kosmos 672. It was a Soyuz 7K-TM spacecraft.

When the air was released from the orbital module (which is ejected before re-entry of the capsule) it caused unexpected motions with the spacecraft. This led to the next test also being uncrewed.

== Mission parameters ==
- Spacecraft: Soyuz-7K-TM №71
- Mass: 6510 to 6680 kg
- Crew: None
- Launched: April 3, 1974
- Landed: April 13, 1974

== See also ==
- Kosmos 672
- Soyuz 16
