= Soyuz 16 =

Crewed flight of the Soyuz programme

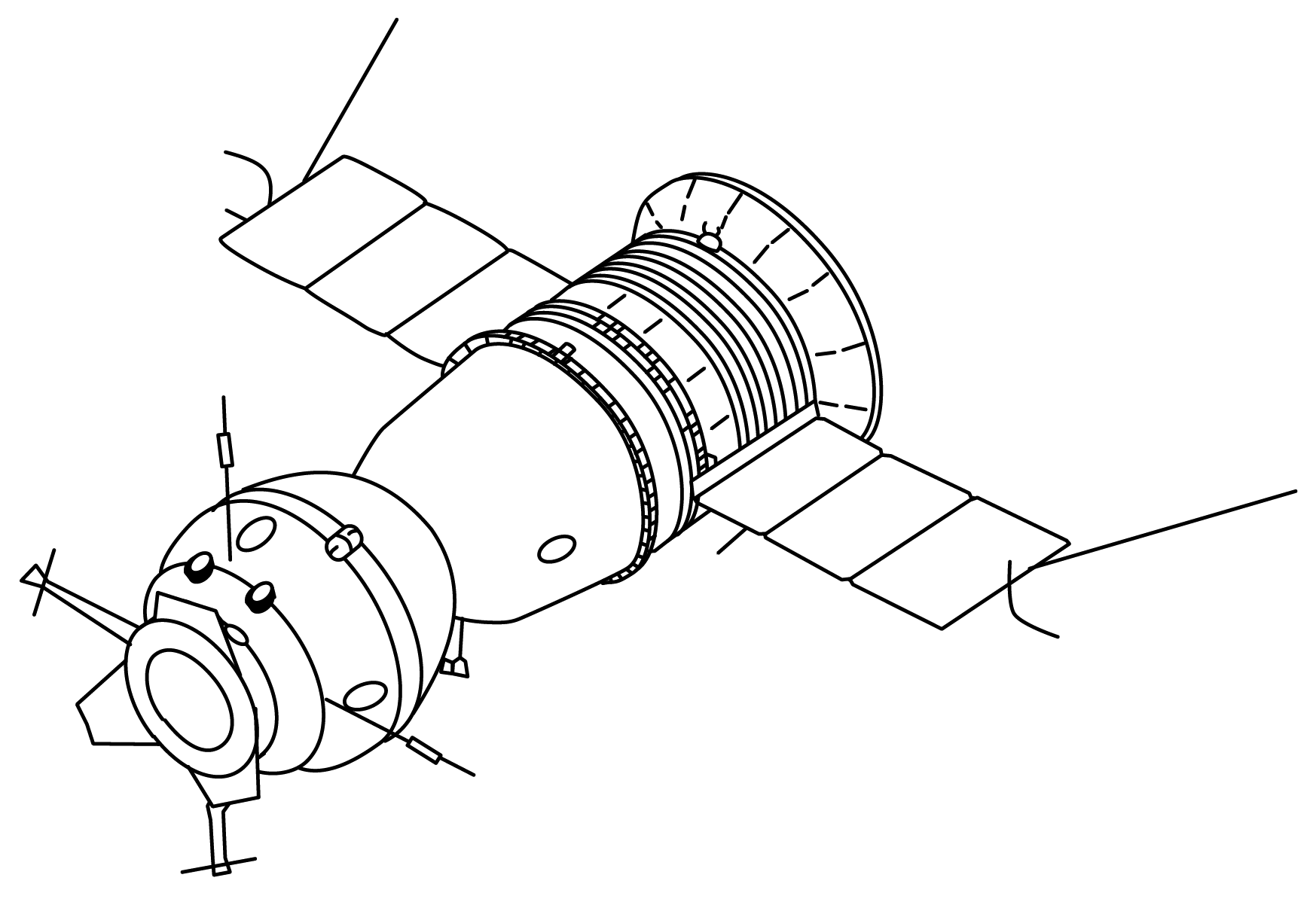
- Mission type: Orbital test flight
- Operator: Soviet space program
- COSPAR ID: 1974-096A
- SATCAT no.: 7561
- Mission duration: 5 days, 22 hours and 23 minutes
- Orbits completed: 95

Spacecraft properties
- Spacecraft: Soyuz 7K-TM No.4
- Spacecraft type: Soyuz 7K-TM
- Manufacturer: NPO Energia
- Launch mass: 6,680 kg (14,730 lb)
- Landing mass: 1,200 kg (2,600 lb)

Crew
- Crew size: 2
- Members: Anatoly Filipchenko; Nikolai Rukavishnikov
- Callsign: Буран (Buran - "Blizzard")

Start of mission
- Launch date: 2 December 1974, 09:40:00 UTC
- Rocket: Soyuz-U
- Launch site: Baikonur 1/5

End of mission
- Landing date: 8 December 1974, 08:03:35 UTC
- Landing site: 30 km (19 mi) of the northeast of Arkalyk, Kazakhstan

Orbital parameters
- Reference system: Geocentric orbit
- Regime: Low Earth orbit
- Perigee altitude: 177 km (110 mi)
- Apogee altitude: 223 km (139 mi)
- Inclination: 51.7°
- Period: 88.4 minutes
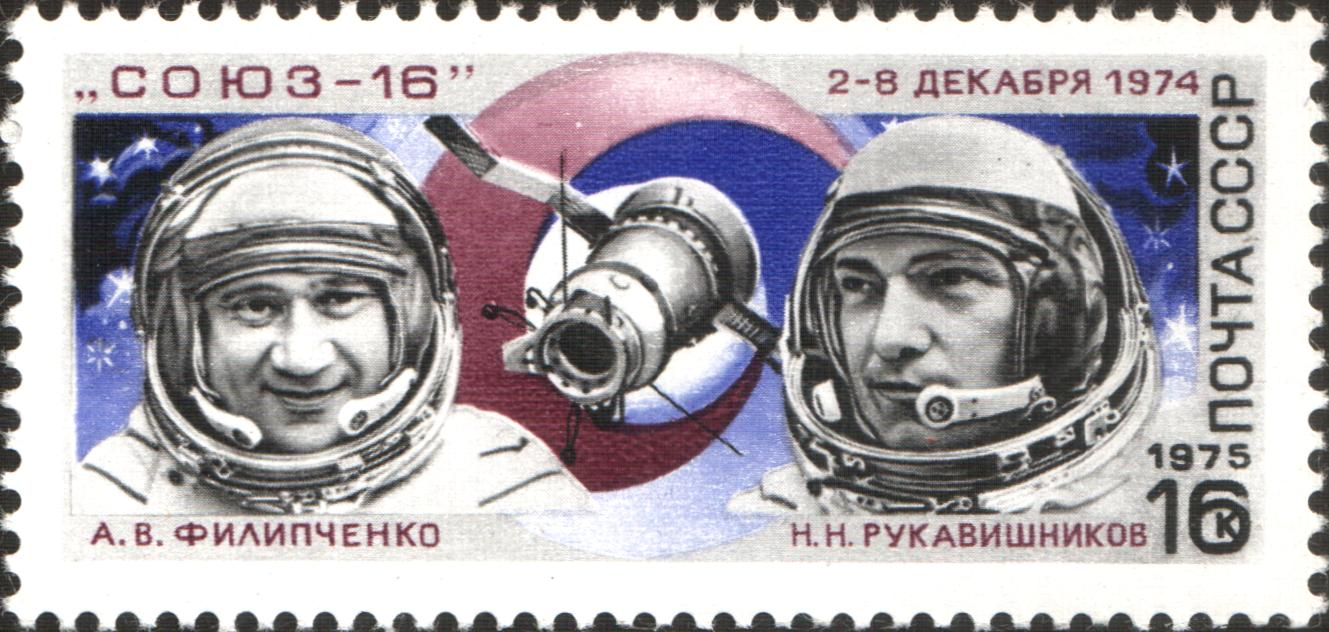
- Soviet stamp featuring Filipchenko and Rukavishnikov (1975) Soyuz programme

Soyuz 16 (Russian: Союз 16, Union 16) was a December, 1974, crewed test flight for a joint Soviet-United States space flight which culminated in the Apollo–Soyuz mission in July 1975. The two-man Soviet crew, Anatoly Filipchenko and Nikolai Rukavishnikov, tested a docking ring and other systems to be used in the joint flight.

== Crew ==
Position	Cosmonaut
Commander	Anatoly Filipchenko; Second and last spaceflight
Flight engineer	Nikolai Rukavishnikov; Second spaceflight

=== Backup crew ===
Position	Cosmonaut
Commander	Vladimir Dzhanibekov
Flight engineer	Boris Andreyev

=== Reserve crew ===
Position	Cosmonaut
Commander	Yuri Romanenko
Flight engineer	Aleksandr Ivanchenkov

== Mission parameters ==
- Mass: 6,680 kg (14,730 lb)
- Perigee: 177.0 km (110.0 mi)
- Apogee: 223.0 km (138.6 mi)
- Inclination: 51.7°
- Period: 88.4 minutes

== Background ==
The Soyuz 16 mission was the final rehearsal and first crewed mission in a program which culminated in the Apollo–Soyuz (ASTP) mission seven months later. The Soviet Union and the United States, Cold War rivals, had signed several arms control treaties in the 1960s and 1970s, and had entered into a period of detente by the early 1970s. In 1972, a treaty was signed to participate in a joint crewed space flight as a symbol of this detente.

Early concepts for a joint flight included the docking of a Soyuz craft to the American Skylab space station, or an Apollo vehicle docking with a Salyut space station. Once the Americans abandoned their Skylab station in 1974, the Apollo-Salyut concept seemed to be the logical choice, but since the Soviets had started to develop a universal docking adapter for the mission and feared having to publicly reveal details of their military-focused Salyut missions, the two powers opted to link a Soyuz spacecraft with an Apollo spacecraft.

Three test flights of an uncrewed version of the ASTP spacecraft were flown: Kosmos 638, launched 3 April 1974; Kosmos 652, launched 15 May 1974; and Kosmos 672, launched 12 August 1974. These three flights, and Soyuz 16, were all launched with an improved version of a Soyuz booster.

== Mission highlights ==
In an unprecedented move, Soviet planners offered to inform their NASA counterparts of the time of the launch, as long as they did not reveal that time to the press. NASA officials refused to agree to that condition and, accordingly, were informed of the launch an hour after it occurred, on 2 December 1974.

During the flight, Cosmonauts Anatoly Filipchenko and Nikolai Rukavishnikov tested the androgynous docking system to be used for the ASTP mission by retracting and extending a simulated 20 kg American docking ring. The crew also tested modified environmental systems, new solar panels and improved control systems, as well as a new radar docking system. Air pressure was reduced from 760 mm to 540 mm and oxygen raised from 20% to 40% to test reducing the planned transfer time to Apollo from two to one hour. On 7 December 1974, the docking ring was jettisoned with explosive bolts to test emergency measures if the capture latches got stuck during the ASTP flight.

The craft landed 8 December 1974, near Arkalyk and was hailed a complete success. The mission duration, six days, matched the ASTP mission duration to within 10 minutes.
