= Liski, Voronezh Oblast =

Town in Voronezh Oblast, Russia

Liski Лиски
- Town
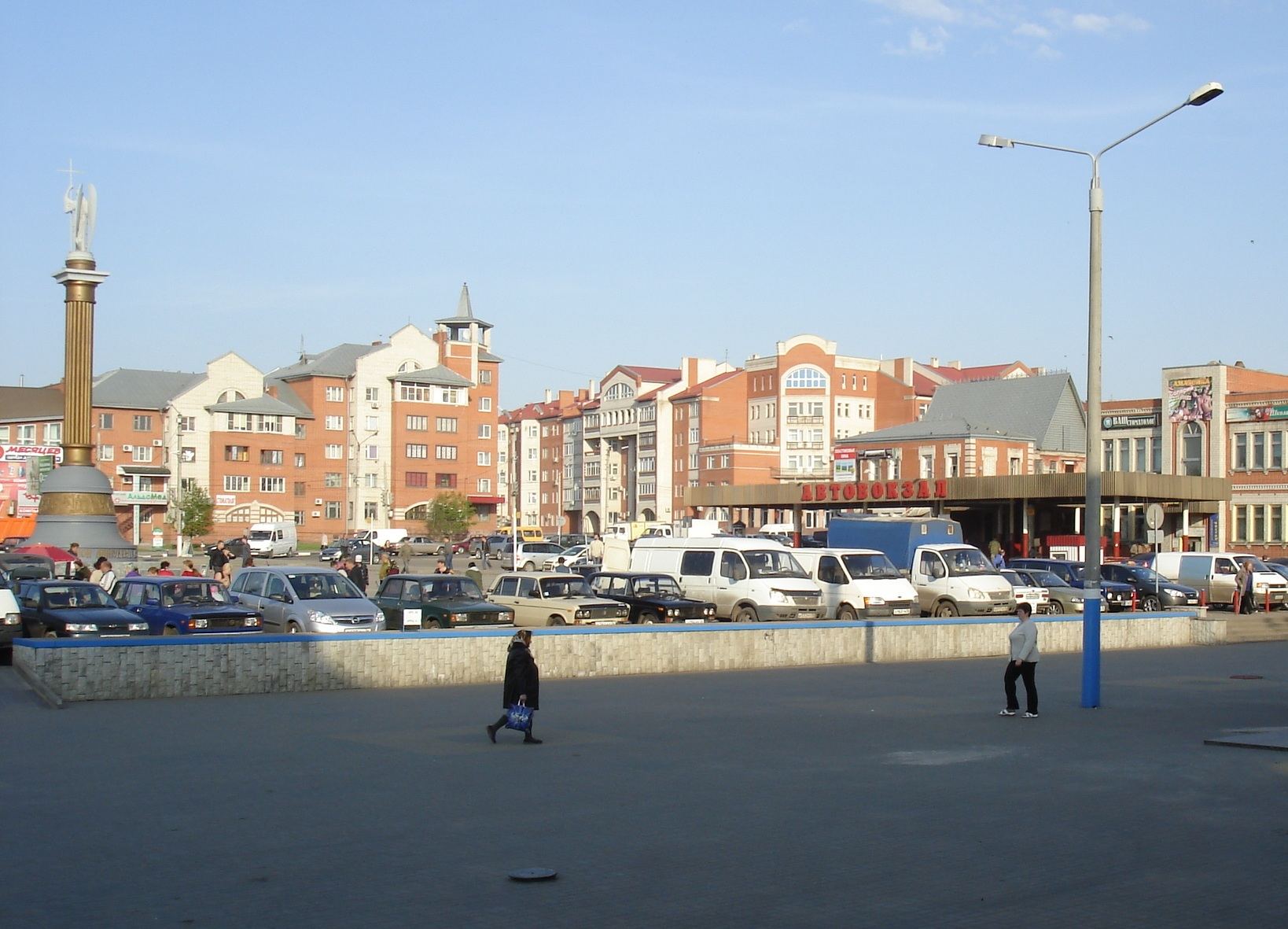
- In Liski

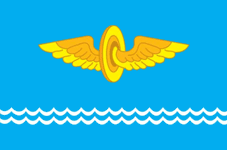
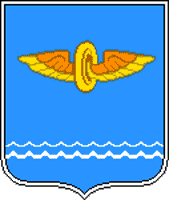
- Flag Coat of arms
- Interactive map of Liski
- Location of Liski Liski (Voronezh Oblast)
- Coordinates: 50°58′N 39°31′E
- Country: Russia
- Federal subject: Voronezh Oblast
- Administrative district: Liskinsky District
- Urban settlementSelsoviet: Liski
- Founded: 1571
- Elevation: 110 m (360 ft)

Population (2010 Census)
  - Total: 55,864
  - Estimate (2025): 51,778 (−7.3%)
  - Rank: 294th in 2010

Administrative status
  - Capital of: Liskinsky District, Liski Urban Settlement

Municipal status
  - Municipal district: Liskinsky Municipal District
  - Urban settlement: Liski Urban Settlement
  - Capital of: Liskinsky Municipal District, Liski Urban Settlement
- Time zone: UTC+3 (MSK)
- Postal codes: 397900–397904, 397906–397910, 397979
- OKTMO ID: 20621101001
- Website: adminliski.ru

Liski (Russian: Ли́ски) is a town and the administrative center of Liskinsky District in Voronezh Oblast, Russia. Population: 54,147 (2021 census); 55,864 (2010 census); 55,893 (2002 census); 54,039 (1989 Soviet census).

== History ==
Liski was founded as Novaya Pokrovka (Новая Покровка) in 1571. The town later merged with the local train station, Liski, in 1928.

It was renamed Svoboda (Свобода) in 1943, and later renamed as Liski.

It was renamed Georgiu-Dezh (Георгиу-Деж) in 1965 after the first Romanian communist leader, Gheorghe Gheorghiu-Dej, before returning to Liski again in 1990.

=== Russian invasion of Ukraine ===
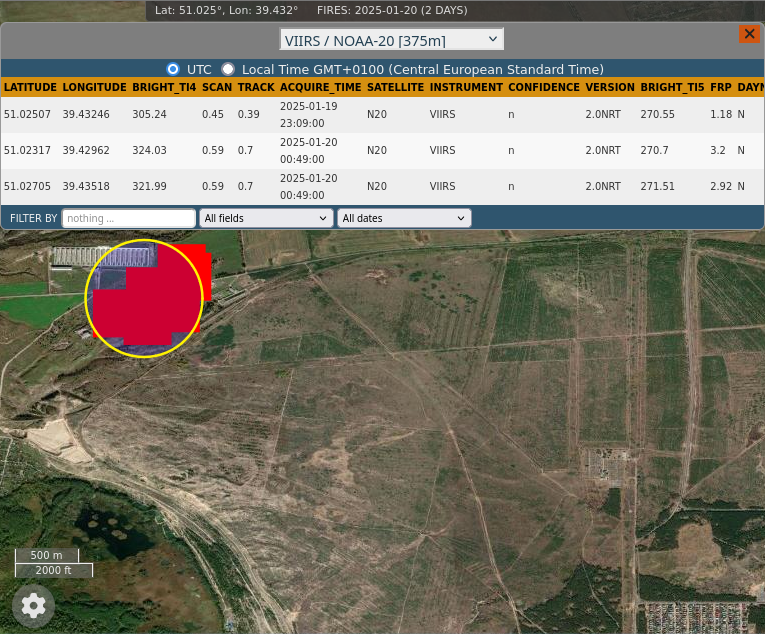
NASA's FIRMS detected extensive fire at a Liski fuel depot on 19 January 2025 23:09:00 (UTC)

On 16 January 2025, during the Russo-Ukrainian War, the General Staff of the Ukrainian Armed Forces claimed to have struck an oil depot located in the town with at least 3 drones. On January 20 the oil depot was struck by drones again, causing an extensive fire detected by NASA's FIRMS.

== Administrative and municipal status ==
Within the framework of administrative divisions, Liski serves as the administrative center of Liskinsky District. As an administrative division, it, together with the khutor of Kalach in Liskinsky District, is incorporated into Liskinsky District as the Liski Urban Settlement. As a municipal division, this administrative unit also has urban settlement status and is part of Liskinsky Municipal District.
