= Liskinsky District =

Liskinsky District Лискинский район (Russian)
- District
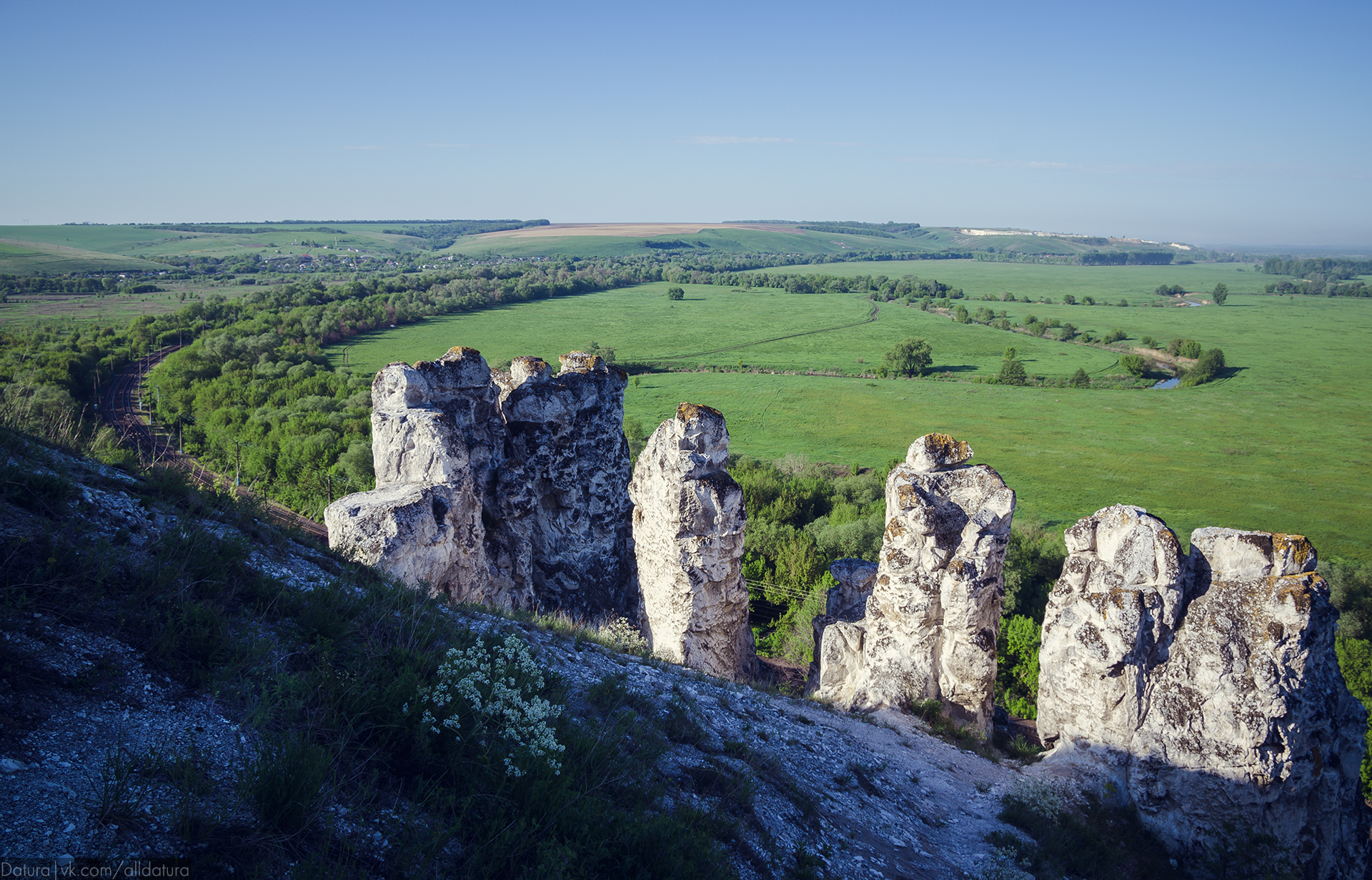
- Divnogorye Reserve, Liskinsky District

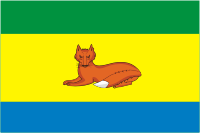
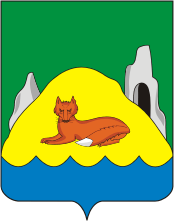
- Flag Coat of arms
- Location of Liskinsky District in Voronezh Oblast
- Coordinates: 50°59′N 39°29′E
- Country: Russia
- Federal subject: Voronezh Oblast
- Established: 30 July 1928
- Administrative center: Liski

Area
  - Total: 2,033 km^{2} (785 sq mi)

Population (2010 Census)
  - Total: 105,704
  - Density: 51.99/km^{2} (134.7/sq mi)
  - Urban: 58.2%
  - Rural: 41.8%

Administrative structure
  - Administrative divisions: 1 Urban settlements (towns), 1 Urban settlements (urban-type settlements), 21 Rural settlements
  - Inhabited localities: 1 cities/towns, 1 urban-type settlements, 74 rural localities

Municipal structure
  - Municipally incorporated as: Liskinsky Municipal District
  - Municipal divisions: 2 urban settlements, 21 rural settlements
- Time zone: UTC+3 (MSK)
- OKTMO ID: 20621000
- Website: http://liski-adm.ru/

Liskinsky District (Russian: Ли́скинский райо́н) is an administrative and municipal district (raion), one of the thirty-two in Voronezh Oblast, Russia. It is located in the western central part of the oblast. The area of the district is 2,033 square kilometers (785 sq mi). Its administrative center is the town of Liski. Population: 98,577 (2021 census); 105,704 (2010 census); 50,142 (2002 census); 50,352 (1989 Soviet census). The population of Liski accounts for 54.9% of the district's total population.
