= BA 2100 =

Space habitat conceptualized by Bigelow Aerospace

- Model of the BA 2100 space station

Station statistics
- Crew: 16
- Mission status: Proposed
- Mass: 65,000–70,000 kg (143,000–154,000 lb)
- Length: 17.8 m (58 ft)
- Diameter: 12.6 m (41 ft)
- Pressurised volume: 2,250 m^{3} (79,000 cu ft)

The BA 2100, or Olympus, was a conceptual inflatable space habitat by Bigelow Aerospace. The larger BA 2100 would extend the volume and capabilities of the B330 module, which is under development as part of the Bigelow Commercial Space Station. As with the B330 module, the number in the name refers to the number of cubic meters of space offered by the module when fully expanded in space (equivalent to 74,000 cubic feet).

The mass of the BA 2100 could be as low as 65,000 to 70,000 kg (143,000 to 154,000 lb), but would more likely be "in the range of 100 metric tons". It is substantially larger than the B330, with the docking ends of the module alone estimated at 7.6 m (25 ft) in diameter. The concept model showed the docking ports at both ends. The BA 2100 would require the use of a super heavy-lift launch vehicle with a fairing at least 8 m (26 ft) wide.

Pressurized volume of single BA 2100 module is 2,250 m^{3} (79,000 cu ft), compared to 1,005 m^{3} (35,500 cu ft) volume of the whole International Space Station as of November 2024.

== See also ==
- TransHab
- Genesis I
- Genesis II
- Bigelow Expandable Activity Module
- Galaxy (spacecraft)
- Sundancer
