= Space diplomacy =

Science diplomacy related to space exploration

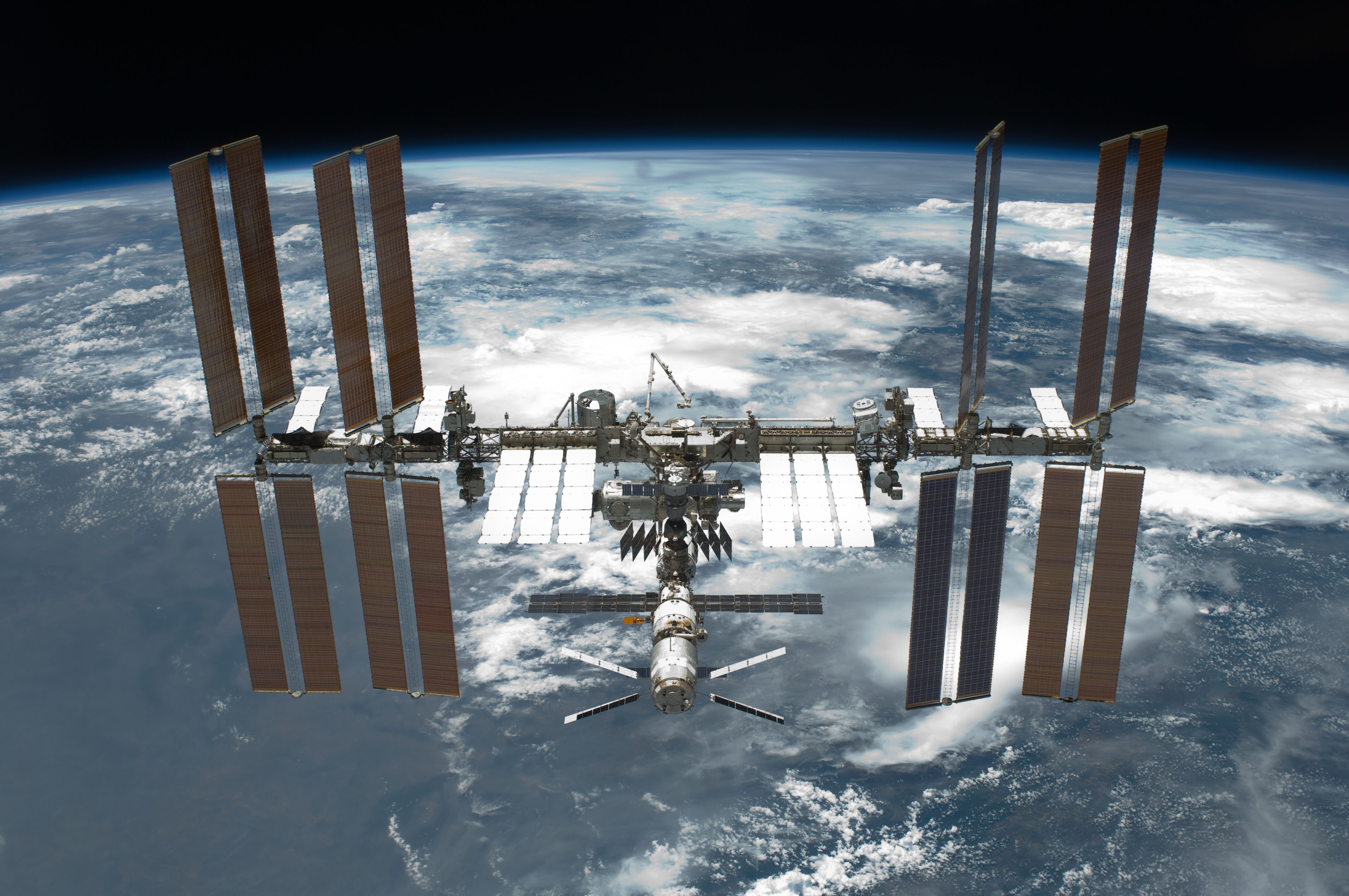
The International Space Station, representing the collaboration of multiple nations in the exploration of space.

Space diplomacy refers to the integration of the collaboration of the knowledge, technology, and legislation involved in science diplomacy as applied to the expanded exploration of space. As diplomatic relationships are integral to the mitigation of various health, scientific, natural or technological issues across nations, space diplomacy is a growing field in which various nations can come to a consensus on what is fair when it comes to the exploration and commercialization of space travel.

== Background ==
Space travel is a necessary resource for people around the world, especially when considering the use of satellites in areas like research or telecommunications. With the exploration of space, major issues are merging, such as environmental concerns and pollution or the monopolization of space travel. Space diplomacy allows for the consideration of such concerns, as officials, scientists, environmental activists, and private corporations can come together in order for both national and private space exploration to prosper. As a term, space diplomacy dates back to at least the 1960s.

Space diplomacy policy and legislation have evolved to accommodate novel space activities and challenges. Initially, from 1959 to 1980, U.S.-Soviet Cold War considerations drove the emergence of the majority of space diplomacy in the form of the slew of binding international agreements that continue to form the basis of the majority of today's space governance. Then, from 1980 to 2000, the rise in the number of both space activities actors and space actors slowed the development of next generation governance. This resulted in weaker, more voluntary diplomatic outputs. This trend continued from 2000, as actors like the European Union and Japan developed their own space diplomacy via instruments like the E.U.'s Galileo satellite navigation system, which went live in 2016, and Japan's Basic Space Law of 2008, while actors like China and the U.S. struggled to find common ground despite China's increasing capacity to reach into space. Today's picture is of increasingly complex space diplomacy, with governments and civil society keen to influence space development despite lacking strong international norms, laws, or standards that might inform such governance, a goal pursued by the United Nations Office for Outer Space Affairs.

The development of future space diplomacy for 2030 and beyond will have to accommodate these trends, which are likely to continue in terms of increasing numbers of activities and actors, for instance through greater involvement of civil society and Global South actors in the attempt to develop supportive legislative and policy solutions. Crucially, in order for space diplomacy to become effective in allowing the sustainable development of space, according to agencies like the U.N., governments must better incorporate civil society in the creation of norms and rules. An increase in the diversity of activities and actors may also result from the U.N.-facilitated Human Space Technology Initiative, launched in 2010 and instrumental in promoting access to space education, space data, and space technology and research facilities, as well as direct access to space via, for example, the U.N. facilitated launch of CubeSats.

== International space law ==
=== Established international laws and regulations ===
Outer space is one of the four identified "global commons", along with the ocean, the atmosphere, and Antarctica. Although the definition of what is a global domain is changing with time and inclusivity, these four domains representing aspects of the environment are the "common heritage of mankind," and as such they are resources that should be shared with all the countries of Earth. In other words, no nation has a sole claim, and the resources associated with these domains should be preserved for everyone. Current international regulations to protect space as a global common and for space travel have been set by the Outer Space Treaty of 1967, which governs that space exploration and the use of celestial bodies are to be used for “peaceful purposes” and for scientific research, as established in Resolution 2222 (XXI). The Treaty states that no country can achieve sovereign control over regions of space. Consequently, the Treaty requires that space should be used as a resource of all people. Space law itself is relatively new as a branch of international law, encompassing the need to designate the access to, and freedom to explore, space. Especially with the establishment of the Committee on the Peaceful Uses of Outer Space (COPUOS) in 1959, participating countries within the United Nations have worked to regulate further human expansion into space, via five main international treaties of space law. These treaties include the Rescue Agreement, the Space Liability Convention, the Registration Convention, and the Moon Treaty, which together regulate activities conducted on celestial bodies. Other agreements aside from the main five were also established in efforts to avoid the use of weapons of mass destruction in space, such as the Partial Nuclear Test Ban Treaty of 1963, which bans the testing of nuclear based weapons in domains including space.

=== Rising pressure to reform space law treaties and principles ===
As the Outer Space Treaty was signed in 1967 as a consequence of the space race between the United States and the Soviet Union, continuous updates to the international agreement to space accounts for the great expansion of space travel in the past 20 years. Despite the attempts to preserve space as a global commons, demands due to technological and science advancements in space, including space exploration and private spaceflight, like in the other global commons domains, have been threatening the guidelines set by the Outer Space Treaty. The “New Space” sector of private industry, which refers to civilian space activities funded by companies such as SpaceX, has been an increasingly competitive entity in the exploration and commercialization of space travel. Representing a contemporaneous space race, the growing network of privatized space flight requires legislation that would facilitate the union between both the public and private sectors of space travel and research across nations. Coupled with growing orbital and suborbital launches across the world, there is a growing need to reform the established legislation set by the United Nations. Another consideration for law reform is the increase in space trash and debris as a result of international orbital launches and exploration.

The Outer Space Treaty and other principles of space law ban the use or testing of weapons of mass destruction, such as nuclear warheads, including in stations in the Earth's orbit. Yet, it is still possible for a nation to participate in space military activities, such as the launching of a nuclear missile through space. Aside from private spaceflight or rover launches in the field of research, nations around the world have recognized the potential to use the domain of space for military defense. For example, the United States and Russia, two of the main actors in the current space race, have not signed the Moon Agreement and so have not agreed to the stipulations of the peaceful treatment of celestial bodies. Signed under the Trump administration in December 2019, the Space Force represents a new branch of the Defense Department and served to establish formal military jurisdiction in the Earth's orbit. The release of the 2020 Defense Space Strategy represents another effort by the United States to expand its national military and defense into space.

Other nations have also been involved in security considerations, such as the effort by the European Union to establish its own policies towards space security. This collaboration of European countries builds upon current shared policies while prioritizing the sustainability and security of space travel.

=== Prevention of the militarization of space ===
The members of the UN have been discussing the provisions of the Outer Space Treaty since the 1980s. In 1981, the Prevention of an Arms Race in Outer Space was presented by the UN General Assembly and has been discussed during the Conference on Disarmament as a resolution that reestablishes the principles of peace outlined in the original Outer Space Treaty. However, due to the clash between the priorities of the UN members, discussions for a Prevention of an Arms Race in Outer Space initiative have never come to full fruition. In favour of such hard legislation, in 2008, both China and Russia drafted and proposed the Prevention of an Arms Race in Space Treaty, which would serve to reaffirm the principles of the Outer Space Treaty while also preventing the militarization of space. Working on a softer policy-driven path, in 2019, the U.N. Committee on the Peaceful Uses of Outer Space Working Group on the Long-term Sustainability of Outer Space Activities finally reached consensus among its 84 member states on 21 'Guidelines for the Long-term Sustainability of Outer Space Activities.' The following year, to specifically counter an arms race in outer space, the U.N. General Assembly adopted Resolution 75/36, Reducing Space Threats through Norms, Rules and Principles of Responsible Behaviours. Issues like dual-use technology and the efficacy of an agreed set of principles versus the long time a formal U.N. treaty might take to be signed and ratified, and especially policed and verified, continue to pose problems.

== Space privatization ==
Over the past few decades, the space environment has dramatically changed as private companies entered the space exploration domain, meaning the sector is no longer the sole preserve of governments and their space agencies, such as NASA and the European Space Agency (ESA). Unlike the space race that occurred between the United States and Russia, this new era of the space race is accelerated by the competition of customers. Private companies in many nations have been involved in the satellite market for many years, and their efforts have paved the way for entrepreneurs to develop their own vision and contribution to space exploration.

=== Privatization in the United States ===
The U.S. space industry is composed of four sectors: (1) defense (2) intelligence, (3) commercial, and (4) civil space sectors. Space privatization is associated with the commercial space sector. For the most part, the U.S. national launch infrastructure has been privatized or leased to companies such as SpaceX, Blue Origin, Virgin Galactic, Bigelow Aerospace, and the Sierra Nevada Corporation. These competitors are focused on reducing the cost of access to space, for example through the reuse of launchers and spacecraft, making space accessible to people and not just trained astronauts.

==== SpaceX ====
SpaceX was created in 2002 by entrepreneur, engineer, and inventor Elon Musk with the mission of taking humans to Mars and revolutionizing space technology. Over the past two decades, the company specialized in the manufacture and launch of rockets that directly competed with the United Launch Alliance, the contract holder for the launch of NASA and Department of Defense rocket launches. SpaceX was the first private company to dock a ship at the International Space Station (ISS), with the development of the Falcon 9 launch and Dragon spacecraft. SpaceX designed the Falcon Heavy to not only launch future satellites into space and carry cargo, but to launch people to destinations like the Moon, or even Mars. SpaceX's ability to design a successful orbital transport system and Falcon 9 launch success at one-third the price of a traditional NASA-contracted launch demonstrates the private-sector capability to fulfill many current NASA functions at a fraction of the cost. Such achievement frees up NASA to concentrate on its core research and exploration missions in space and allows the private sector to invest in a self-sustaining space-based industry.

==== Blue Origin ====
Blue Origin was founded by Amazon's CEO, Jeff Bezos, in September 2000, with the goal of making space travel more accessible and cheaper through reusable launch systems. Unlike SpaceX, Blue Origin aims to target the space tourism industry. The company development a vertical launch vehicle, the New Shepard, that could reach an altitude of 100 km and descend back to Earth by landing vertically. Blue Origin has also created the New Glenn rocket, a reusable heavy-lift launch vehicle that can carry a payload to orbit. Both innovations demonstrate the competition that is occurring in the private sector. Similar to Elon Musk's intention with SpaceX, Bezos aims to make innovations that will allow future generations to inhabit space. Specifically, Blue Origin's goal is to promote future generations to construct a space station in orbit around Earth, perpetually in motion to produce artificial gravity, where humans would re-create cities, national parks, and even famous sites.

==== Virgin Galactic ====
Founded by technology and retail entrepreneur Richard Branson in 2004, Virgin Galactic is a private space company that describes itself as “the world's first commercial space line.” Virgin Galactic has been planned to carry six passengers at a time into sub-orbital space and provide them six minutes of weightlessness in the course of a two and a half our flight. The technology differs from SpaceX and Blue Origin because the launch into space was not from the ground, but from a jet airplane. This ship flies to an altitude of about 18 km and releases a smaller, rocket powered spacecraft called SpaceShip Two, which is propelled to an altitude of about 100 km. Like SpaceX and Blue Origin, Virgin Galactic aims to transform the space sector by making space exploration easier for people.

==== Bigelow Aerospace ====
Bigelow Aerospace was founded by hotel magnate Robert Bigelow in 1999. The company wanted to provide a low-cost, low Earth orbit space station that is accessible to the commercial sectors. To accomplish this, the company started to create habitats that can expand after being deployed in space. The places would provide some protection from solar and cosmic radiation, space debris, and other elements. Biglelow first licensed an expandable module technology from NASA after the agency canceled a project called TransHab, which had developed it. The company then launched two spacecraft, Genesis 1 in 2006 and Genesis 2 in 2007, on Dnepr rockets from Russia, to demonstrate that expandable module technology. The spacecraft demonstrated that the modules were stable and maintained air pressure. In 2013, the company signed a contract with NASA to build a similar expandable module, called the Bigelow Expandable Activity Module (BEAM), and install it on the ISS. In April 2016, this module was successfully deployed outside the International Space Station. The company is currently developing another module, the B330, in the hope of creating outposts in Earth orbit, lunar orbit, and on surface of the Moon, which could be visited by paying customers. In March 2020, however, Bigelow Aerospace laid off its workforce, and the company's future ambitions are unknown.

==== Sierra Nevada Corporation ====
Founded in 1963 by John Chisholm, the Sierra Nevada Corporation (SNC) is a privately held electronic systems provider and systems integrator specializing in microsatellites, telemedicine, and commercial orbital transportation services. SNC is notable for its Dream Chaser, a planned commercial crew spacecraft, which will ferry up to seven astronauts and cargo to and from the International Space Station. SNC was able to transition from small satellites to crewed spacecraft by partnering with companies such as Draper Laboratory, NASA's Langley Research Center, Boeing, and United Launch Alliance. Nevertheless, SNC hopes to use this mini shuttle, the Dream Chaser, to take a lead in space tourism and commerce real estate. In 2021, SNC will use the United Launch Alliance's Vulcan Centaur rocket as the launch vehicle for Dream Chaser's cargo configuration. Furthermore, other products created by SNC includes spacecraft actuators that power the Mars rovers and hybrid rocket technologies that powered the first commercial astronaut to space.

=== International space privatization ===
Space privatization is not only becoming prominent in the U.S.: competition amongst space programs in Russia, Europe, Japan, India, and China has been growing significantly. The European Space Agency was established before the alliance between Russia and the U.S. in 1975, following many years of independent aeronautical engineering research by individual nations. Similarly, Chinese, Japanese and Indian space agencies began in the 1960s. A number of smaller countries, including the United Arab Emirates, also are participating in the space competition.

China became the third nation to independently launch a human into orbit, in 2003, and its capabilities have since grown. China's visions include sending people to the Moon and building a space station as well as creating its own robotic explorer. Meanwhile, India launched its first unmanned mission to Mars in late 2013, and its probe entered Mars's orbit in September 2014. Since then, the Indian Space Research Organization has reached an agreement with NASA on subsequent explorations of Mars. China and the United Arab Emirates successfully sent spacecraft to orbit Mars in February 2021, which was when NASA landed its rover there.

The advancements of transportation infrastructure by both national and international private players have created an environment conducive to developing space-based industries that use commerce to greatly increase the quality of life and decrease the cost of living. Examples of space-based activities that have commercial potential include, but are not limited to, tapping space-based clean energy sources, mining asteroids for useful raw materials, developing safe venues for scientific experiments, upcycling/sequestering hazardous but valuable debris currently in space, tapping sources of water already in space, to decouple into oxygen and hydrogen for space fuels and oxidizers and to provide radiation shielding mass, and so forth. Collaboration between both public and private space companies in which the private sector develops the space industry and government parties and agencies, like NASA, buy transport and other key services, such as on-orbit facilities, as customers of the private providers. NASA, as an example, has already begun buying some space transportation in this manner. Such actions are leading to a comprehensive advancement in space.

== Environmental consequences ==
Due to the lack of sufficient established international space laws able to create boundaries and define the regulation of space, space exploration and private ownership of space incur negative consequences for Earth's environment and for space itself. Rocket and space launches have been steady since the space race, starting from 1955. However, the recent space race between billionaires Elon Musk, Jeff Bezos and Richard Branson have significantly increased the number of space launches: in 2019 alone, there were 443 launches. Space launches provide in-depth knowledge of space, create new markets, and spur space diplomacy; however, such a high increase in launches has several negative effects for Earth.

=== Carbon dioxide emissions ===
Space launches pose a problem for the environment because it can emit a very high quantity of carbon dioxide, depending on the size of the spacecraft or rocket, into the environment. Carbon dioxide occurs naturally in the atmosphere; however, a significantly increased amount of CO_{2} pollutes the air and traps radiation and heat from the sun. The build up of carbon dioxide prevents the Earth from cooling at night and causes climate change. The Falcon 9 launched by SpaceX in 2018, burned 112,184 kilograms of kerosene, which released 336,552 kg of carbon dioxide into the Earth's atmosphere. In 2020 alone, there were a total of 104 successful space launches, with each launch adding significantly to the CO_{2} buildup. Furthermore, because no strict space regulations exist for environmental maintenance, the amount of carbon dioxide emitted is left unregulated, causing environmental issues such as greenhouse gas emissions. Recently, there has been a surge in space companies professing awareness of the issues, and some are actively innovating ways to combat these large emissions. For example, Virgin Galactic announced it will burn fuel for only 60 seconds to limit the environmental effect.

=== Black carbon accumulation ===
Launching kerosene-fueled rockets and spaceships adds black carbon, also known as soot, to the upper layer of the atmosphere. Black carbon is a particle that absorbs solar energy, and in comparison to carbon dioxide in the atmosphere, it absorbs more than one million times of energy than CO_{2}. The accumulation of black carbon that absorbs solar energy in the atmosphere can warm the atmosphere and so can significantly increase the rate of global warming. In addition, black carbon not only stays in the atmosphere but precipitates back onto the Earth while lowering the reflecting power of surfaces, important to maintaining a cool temperature. With the accumulation of black carbon, absorption replaces reflection. The increased absorption targets snow covered regions such as the Arctic ice caps. Because of the absorbance of solar energy in the ice, the Arctic ice cap is melting at an alarming rate. Sea levels are rising as a consequence, which threatens many cities and even countries. In response, some space companies, such as Orbex, planned on reducing black carbon in order to be more space conscious.

=== Space junk ===
Space junk is human made debris in the form of the remnants of rockets and spaceships; there exists no international agreement on the best way to remove it. This is problematic as four thousand active and inactive satellites in space are in danger of being struck by space debris. Space equipment affected in this way, as well as space junk itself, can plummet towards Earth and harm its environment and people. Removing such space junk is problematic because with the increasing amount of space equipment deployed by increasingly numerous countries, it is difficult to know if one piece of space junk targeted for removal is actually another country's active space property. Although the United Nations Office for Outer Space Affairs has developed space debris mitigation guidelines where space launches should have a plan to remove the junk produced within 25 years, it is voluntary and is followed by only 40% of all space missions.

== The Space2030 Agenda ==
Rooted in the realization that space is a frontier transcending national boundaries and interests, with benefits that should be accessible to all countries, The Space2030 Agenda underscores the importance of international cooperation and the peaceful use of outer space. The Space2030 Agenda, created by the United Nations Office for Outer Space Affairs (UNOOSA) in partnership with UN Member States, aims to harness the potential of space science, technology, applications, and infrastructure for the benefit of humanity. It is designed as a key instrument for global sustainable development, fostering peaceful cooperation among the UN's Member States. The agenda encompasses space usage by government, intergovernmental, and non-governmental organizations, including private enterprises and industries from each UN Member State.

By integrating space technologies within the broader framework of the United Nations' Sustainable Development Goals (SDGs), the agenda aims to leverage space technology and exploration to support sustainable development worldwide. It aims to address critical issues such as climate change, global health, disaster risk reduction, and socioeconomic development. A joint study titled 'Space4SDGs' between UNOOSA and the European Global Navigation Satellite System (GNSS) Agency discovered that space technology benefits all 17 SDGs.

This agenda aims to make the benefits of space exploration and technology accessible to all countries, contributing to humanity's betterment. Its objectives and implementation plan are structured around the four overarching pillars of space economy, space society, space accessibility, and space diplomacy, highlighting the multifaceted role of space in modern society. However, the implementation of the Space2030 Agenda may face various challenges, necessitating the creation of a more comprehensive space sustainability framework and regulatory structure. This is essential for establishing a circular space economy that operates within Earth's safe and just boundaries while simultaneously unlocking space's potential for everyone.

=== Four Overarching Pillars ===
There are four overarching pillars which under-gird The Space2030 Agenda and inform the strategic objectives within the document. These are:

Space Diplomacy: Fostering space diplomacy through partnerships and strengthening global collaboration in the peaceful utilization of outer space.

Space Economy: Boosting the economic advantages derived from space and reinforcing the space sector's impact as a key contributor to a sustainable economy.

Space Society: Promoting the societal advantages of space-related endeavors and maximizing the application of space technologies and services to enhance the quality of life on Earth.

Space Accessibility: Enhancing the availability of space for everyone, guaranteeing that nations worldwide can gain socioeconomic advantages from the use of space science, technology, and space-derived data and products.

=== Objectives ===
The primary objectives of the Space2030 Agenda are organized around the four pillars, and these are:

Objective 1: Boost the economic advantages gained from space and reinforce the space sector's role as a key catalyst for sustainable development.

Objective 2: Utilize the capabilities of space to address daily challenges and capitalize on space-related advancements to enhance the quality of life.

Objective 3: Improve the accessibility of space for everyone and guarantee that all nations can reap socioeconomic advantages from the applications of space science and technology, as well as from space-derived data, information, and products, thus aiding in the fulfillment of the Sustainable Development Goals (SDGs).

Objective 4: Forge alliances and bolster global collaboration for the peaceful exploration of outer space, as well as in the international management of activities in outer space.

=== Implementation ===
UNOOSA will play a central role in facilitating the implementation of the Space2030 Agenda. This will be carried out in collaboration with Member States, international organizations, the private sector, academia, and civil society.

==== Key Initiatives ====
The Space2030 Agenda drives several key implementation initiatives to realize its goals, including a global partnership that includes international cooperation on space exploration, data sharing, and joint research. It also emphasizes the role of space tools in supporting the Sustainable Development Goals (SDGs) through applications in environmental monitoring, agriculture, health, and disaster management. Additionally, the development of policy and legal frameworks is critical for fostering the peaceful use of outer space and promoting responsible conduct among nations and private entities engaged in space activities.

==== Progress Reviews ====
The Committee on the Peaceful Uses of Outer Space (COPUOS) is tasked with monitoring the progress of The Space2030 Agenda. It includes regular agenda items for Member States and permanent observers to exchange experiences and best practices. A midterm review is scheduled for 2025, followed by a final review in 2030, where the committee will report to the United Nations General Assembly on the implementation outcomes.

==== Challenges ====
The implementation of the Space2030 Agenda faces significant hurdles, including geopolitical tensions, resource limitations, and the complexities of space exploration. A major issue is ensuring equitable access to space, as disparities in technological advancement among nations persist. The growth of the space sector, driven by private enterprise, has led to increased space data usage for societal benefits but also exacerbated challenges like space debris, orbital congestion and increasing greenhouse gas emissions. This situation creates a 'space sustainability paradox,' where efforts to achieve Sustainable Development Goals (SDGs) through space could become counterproductive due to environmental impacts on Earth and in space. Current regulations are insufficient, risking a 'tragedy of the commons' in space, where unregulated exploitation leads to resource depletion. Sustainable space development must consider three pillars: 1) addressing global challenges through space; 2) preserving space as a resource; and 3) protecting Earth from the impacts of space activities. Without comprehensive international policies and regulation, the long-term accessibility and safety of space are jeopardized, underlining the need for immediate action to ensure space's sustainable use.

=== Future Direction ===
In the future the Space2030 Agenda imagines a world in which space exploration and technology play a key role in driving progress on the SDGs and promoting peaceful relationships between nations. The agenda encourages ongoing innovation, adaptation to emerging space challenges, and sustained commitment from the global community to realize the full potential of space for humanity.

== See also ==
- Politics of Outer Space
- Private spaceflight
- Space debris
- United Nations Committee on the Peaceful Uses of Outer Space
