= Galaxy (spacecraft) =

- Logo for the Galaxy module program

Station statistics
- Crew: Unmanned
- Mission status: Canceled
- Length: 4.0 m (13.1 ft)
- Diameter: 3.3 m (10.8 ft)
- Pressurised volume: 16.7 m^{3} (589.8 cu ft)

Galaxy (previously Guardian) was a canceled prototype space habitat designed by the American firm Bigelow Aerospace, and was intended to be the third spacecraft launched by the company in their efforts to create a commercial space station. Like other modules made by Bigelow Aerospace, Galaxy was based on the inflatable TransHab design by NASA, and was to be used for advanced systems testing before the company launched human-rated vehicles.

== Spacecraft history ==
Galaxy started life as twin spacecraft named Guardian which would have acted as 45% scale intermediates between the one-third size Genesis I & Genesis II pathfinders and the full size BA 330 man-rated module. Sometime after 2004, the two Guardian flights were split into the Galaxy module and larger Sundancer module, each testing progressively advanced systems. This Galaxy had twice the interior volume of the Genesis craft: 23.0 cubic meters (812.2 cu ft). In 2007, the parameters for Galaxy were again modified, with final specifications being for a spacecraft 4.0 meters (13.1 ft) in length, 3.3 meters (10.8 ft) in diameter and with 16.7 cubic meters (589.8 cu ft) of interior volume—45% greater than the Genesis modules. It was intended for launch in late 2008.

In August 2007, however, Bigelow Aerospace announced that due to rising launch costs (stated as three times more expensive than for previous launches) and the successful Genesis missions, the Galaxy spacecraft would not be launched. Instead, many of the module's systems—possibly the entire craft—would be constructed and ground tested, allowing Bigelow employees to gain further experience and potentially advance Sundancer's schedule.

== Systems ==
A number of advanced and experimental systems were to be flight tested aboard Galaxy. Among the most notable upgrades were improved avionics and attitude control systems, a more damage-resistant interior air barrier and expanded communications bandwidth capabilities. Also on the manifest were larger, more efficient, articulated solar arrays and supporting battery systems, and flight qualifications would be performed on elements of the Environmental Control and Life Support System (ECLSS). Galaxy would have included more efficient structural components, lending to easier upscaling to larger spacecraft, and was to carry a view port and access hatch, though no docking port would be included on this flight.

== See also ==
- BA 2100
- Bigelow Expandable Activity Module
