= Kosmos 1300 =

Soviet intelligence satellite

- Mission type: ELINT
- COSPAR ID: 1981-082A
- SATCAT no.: 12785

Spacecraft properties
- Spacecraft: no. 30
- Spacecraft type: Tselina-D
- Launch mass: 2,000 kilograms (4,400 lb)

Start of mission
- Launch date: 24 August 1981
- Rocket: Tsyklon-3
- Launch site: Plesetsk Cosmodrome Site 32/1

End of mission
- Disposal: Decommissioned

Orbital parameters
- Reference system: Geocentric

Kosmos 1300 also known as Tselina-D #30 was an electronic signals intelligence satellite launched by the Soviet Union on 8 August 1981 from Plesetsk Cosmodrome Site 32/1 on a Tsyklon-3 rocket.

It is estimated to weigh two tons and have a lifetime of two months. Since it stopped functioning, Kosmos 1300 has become space debris.

== Potential collision ==
On 18 September 2019 at 8:05:55 UTC it was projected to have a 5.6% chance of colliding with the Genesis II commercial space debris at a velocity of 14.6 km/s. The collision would take place over Awasa, Ethiopia. Bigelow Aerospace, the company that made Genesis II, reported afterward that the US Air Force had notified them that there was no collision.
