= Inflatable space habitat =

Structure that can support life whose volume can be increased in outer space

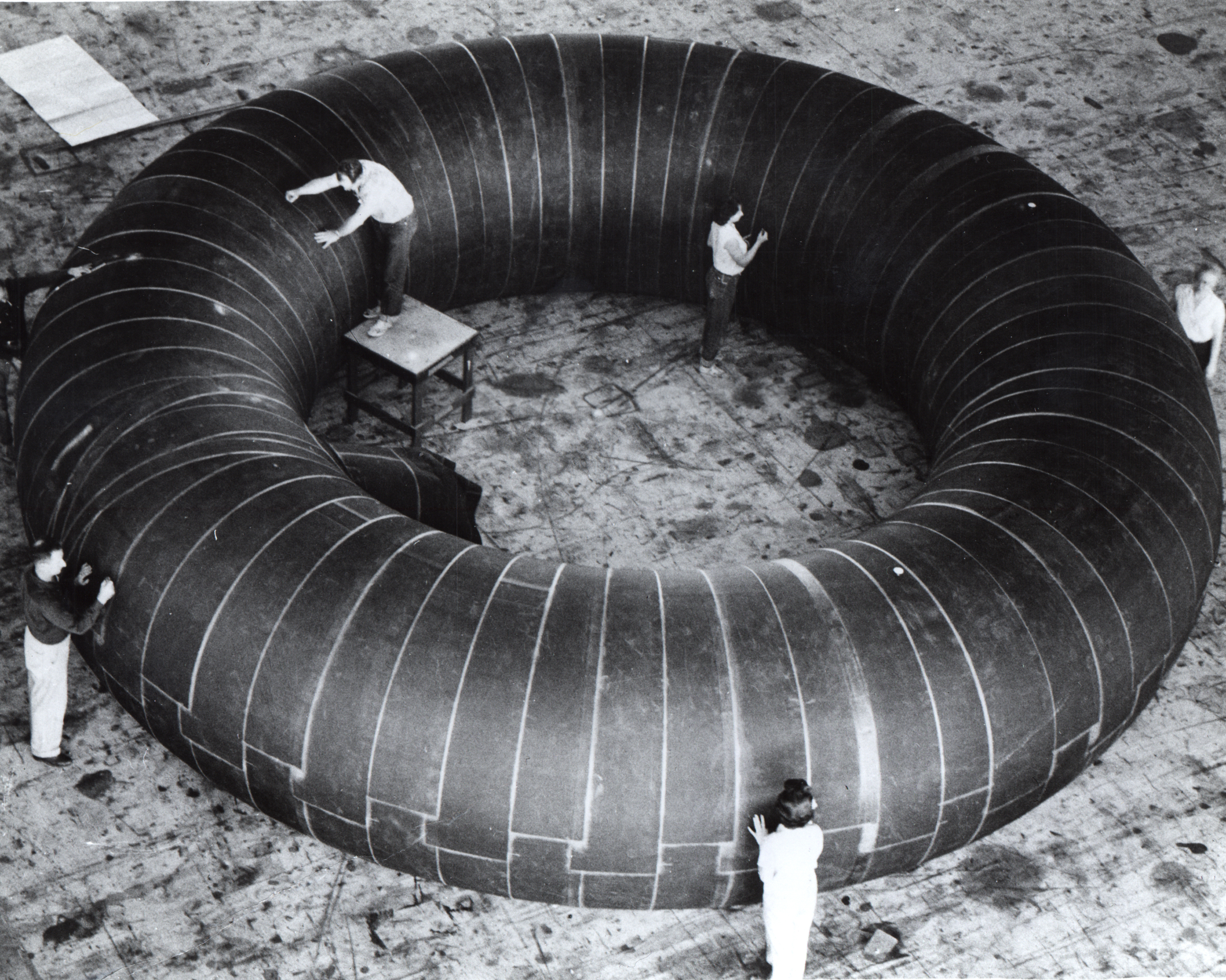
Toroid inflatable station concept during testing (NASA 1961)

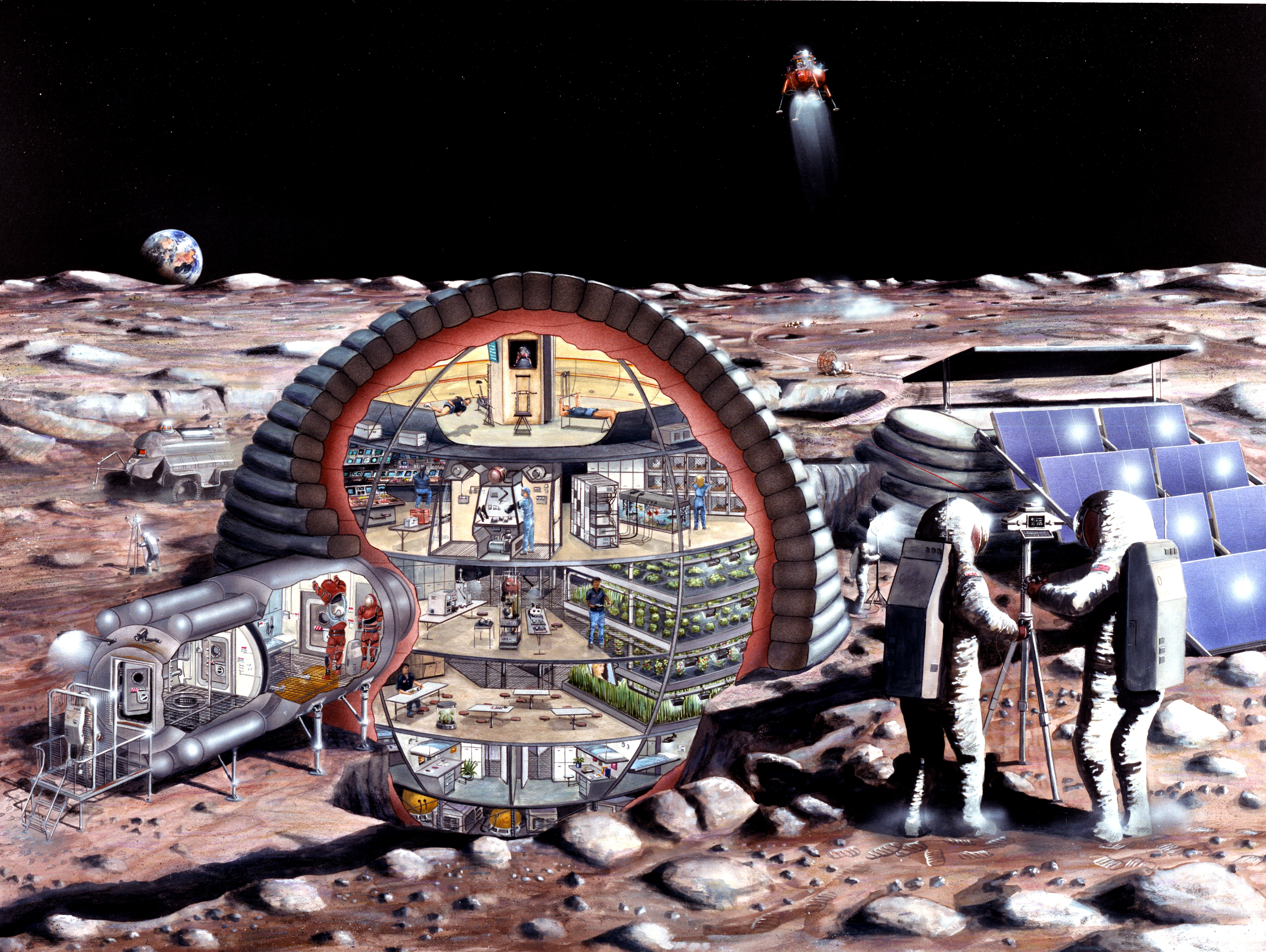
Inflatable lunar habitat proposal (NASA 1989)

Inflatable habitats or expandable habitats are pressurized tent-like structures capable of supporting life in outer space whose internal volume increases after launch. They have frequently been proposed for use in space applications to provide a greater volume of living space for a given mass.

The first formal design and manufacture of an inflatable space habitat was in 1961 with a space station design produced by Goodyear (although this design was never flown). A proposal released in 1989 by Johnson Space Center's Man Systems Division outlined a 16 metres (52 ft) diameter spherical habitat lunar outpost which was partially buried in the lunar surface.

An inflatable module called TransHab (a portmanteau of Transit Habitat) was proposed for the International Space Station, and later the private company Bigelow Aerospace revived the design for use in a number of potential civil and commercial applications.

== Construction ==
The construction of an inflatable space habitat is determined by its design objectives. However common elements include interwoven layers of highly durable materials such as Kevlar and mylar around a flexible air bladder which is used to retain an atmosphere. The shape of the module is maintained by the pressure difference between the internal atmosphere and the outside vacuum. The inflatable Bigelow Aerospace modules have an internal core which provides structural support during its launch into orbit.

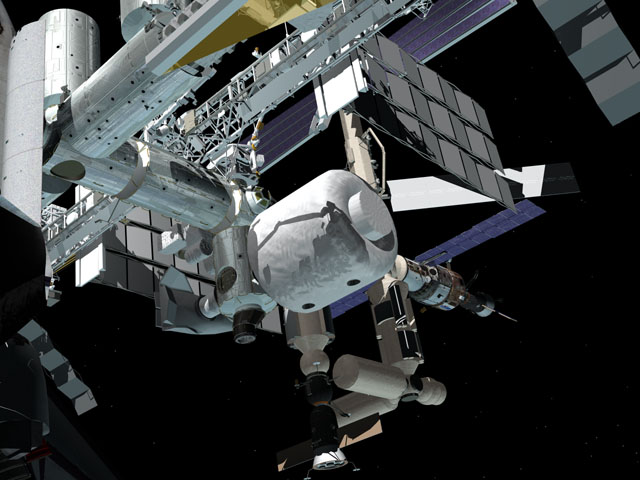
An artist's rendering of the TransHab inflatable module berthed to the ISS.

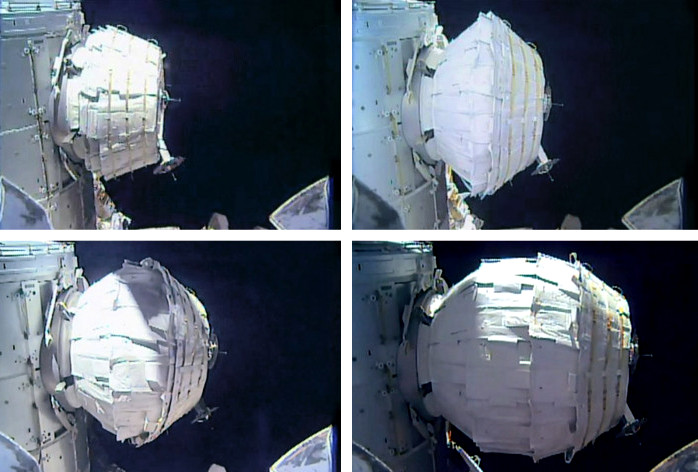
The Bigelow Expandable Activity Module (BEAM), attached to the ISS, being inflated on May 28, 2016

== Ongoing research ==
Currently the main areas of research are being undertaken by Sierra Space and NASA. NASA is currently studying inflatable lunar bases with the planetary surface habitat and airlock unit which is in an early prototype phase, and has conceptual proposals for utilizing expandable-technology space structures in cislunar and interplanetary crewed exploration spacecraft.

=== Bigelow Aerospace development work ===
From its founding in 1998 until its closing in 2020, Bigelow Aerospace performed pioneering research and development work in coordination with NASA on inflatable space habitats. In 2021 Sierra Space was founded, which continued the development of inflatable space habitats in partnership with NASA.

==== Bigelow- Expandable Activity Module ====
The Bigelow Expandable Activity Module (BEAM) was an experimental expandable space station module developed by the now defunct Bigelow Aerospace, under contract to NASA, for testing as a temporary module on the International Space Station (ISS) from 2016 to at least 2020. It arrived at the ISS on April 10, 2016, was berthed to the station on April 16, and was expanded and pressurized on May 28, 2016.

==== Bigelow- Commercial Space Station ====
The Bigelow Next-Generation Commercial Space Station, composed of two types of expandable space habitat modules, was announced in mid-2010. The initial build-out of the station was announced for 2014/2015, and would have consisted of two Sundancer modules and one B330 module. Bigelow has publicly shown space station design configurations with up to nine B330 modules containing 100,000 cu ft (2,800 m^{3}) of habitable space In 2011 the B330 was in final design with construction getting underway. Bigelow began to publicly refer to the initial configuration—two Sundancer modules and one B330 module—as "Space Complex Alpha" in October 2010.

In March 2020, Bigelow laid off all 88 of its employees. As of January 2024 the company remains dormant and is currently considered defunct. In April 2021 Sierra Space was founded, which continued to develop inflatable space habitats as its predecessor Bigelow Aerospace had done previously.

=== NASA Multi-Mission Space Exploration Vehicle ===
In early 2011, NASA put forward a conceptual proposal for a long-duration crewed space transport vehicle which includes an artificial gravity space habitat intended to promote crew-health for a crew of up to six persons on missions of up to two years duration. Called the Multi-Mission Space Exploration Vehicle (MMSEV), the partial-G torus-ring centrifuge would utilize both standard metal-frame and inflatable spacecraft structures and would provide 0.11 to 0.69 G (1.1–6.8 m/s^{2} or 3.6–22.3 ft/s^{2}).

Related to MMSEV is the ISS Centrifuge Demo, proposed in 2011 as a demonstration project preparatory to the final design of the larger torus centrifuge space habitat for the Multi-Mission Space Exploration Vehicle. The structure would have an outside diameter of 30 feet (9.1 m) with a 30-inch (760 mm) ring interior cross-section diameter and would provide 0.08 to 0.51 G (0.8–5 m/s^{2} or 2.6–16.4 ft/s^{2}). This test and evaluation centrifuge would have the capability to become a sleep module for ISS crew.

=== Sierra Space- LIFE Habitat ===
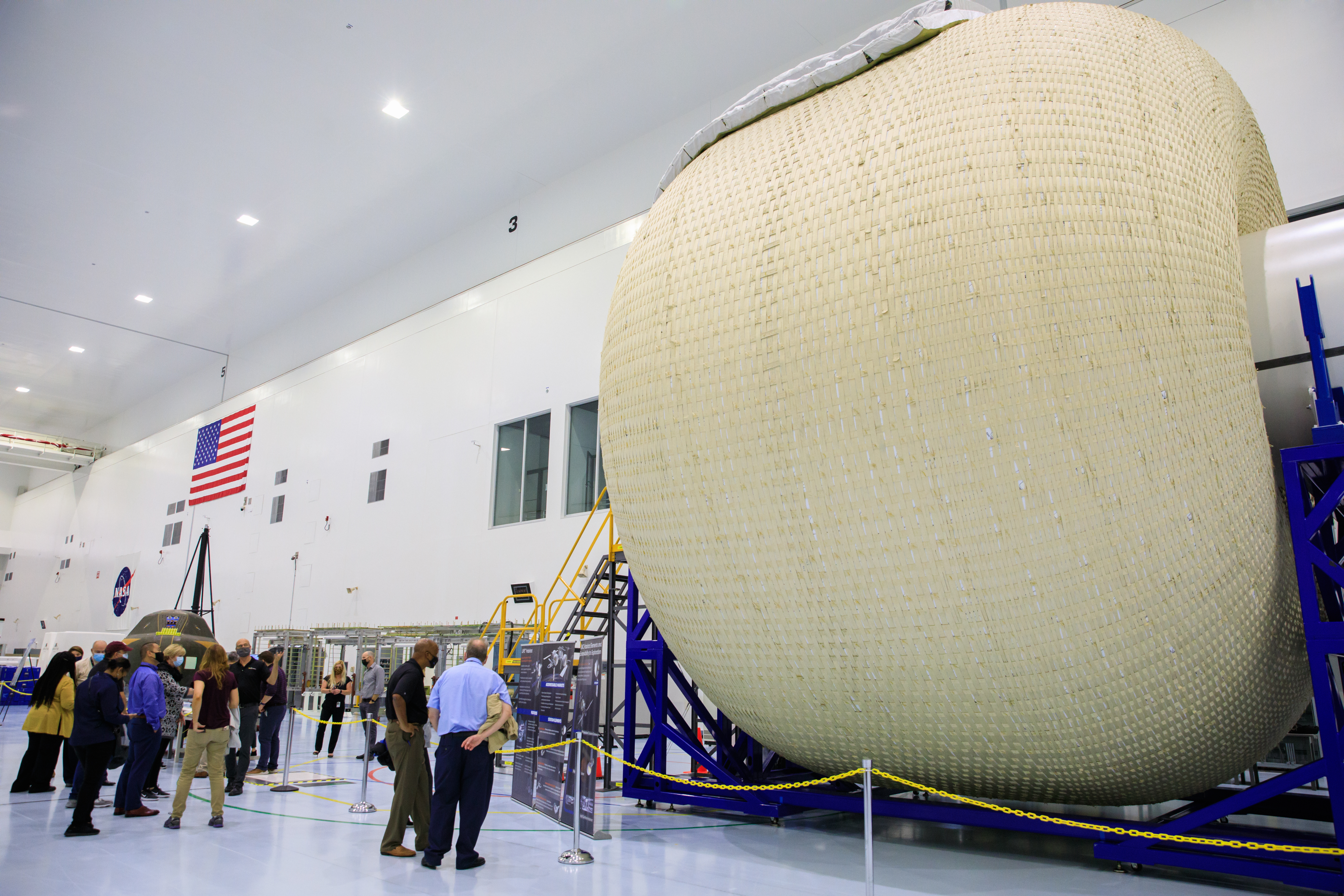
Sierra Space's prototype Large Inflatable Fabric Environment (LIFE) habitat inside the Space Station Processing Facility high bay on April 19, 2021

LIFE (Large Integrated Flexible Environment or Large Inflatable Fabric Environment) is an inflatable space habitat currently being developed by Sierra Space. The proposed Orbital Reef commercial space station includes multiple LIFE habitats in its design.

=== Lunar Surface Habitat ===
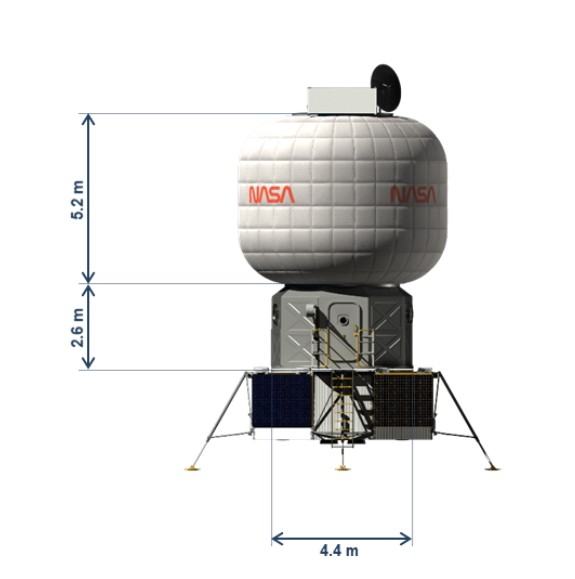
Lunar Surface Habitat

Lunar Surface Habitat is an inflatable habitat proposed by NASA for Artemis program.

=== Lockheed Martin inflatable habitat ===
Lockheed Martin is developing an inflatable habitat, the first intended use of which was the main module of the Starlab space station. However, this module was cancelled and replaced by a rigid module developed by Airbus.

=== Max Space inflatable habitat ===
Max Space, a startup, is developing an inflatable habitat.

=== Chinese module ===
China is developing an inflatable module. A small module was launched with Shijian 19 on 27 September 2024.

== Advantages ==
- All other factors being equal, the aerodynamic load any vehicle is subjected to as it travels through an atmosphere increases with the square of its diameter. Therefore, a launch vehicle's diameter must be kept to a minimum to ensure a reasonably safe and fuel-efficient ascent through the lower atmosphere. In contrast, a vehicle designed to travel in a vacuum can be engineered without regard for aerodynamics. Because the diameter of the habitat is not strictly constrained by the diameter of the launch (and, if desired, re-entry) vehicle(s), inflatables can have a greater volume of living space for a given mass.
- Some designs offer higher resistance to space debris. For example, the B330 provides ballistic protection superior to traditional aluminum shell designs.
- Some designs provide higher levels of shielding against radiation. For example, the B330 provides radiation protection equivalent to or better than the International Space Station, "and substantially reduces the dangerous impact of secondary radiation."

== Flight experience ==
The 1965 Voskhod 2 mission employed an inflatable airlock for the first ever EVA.

As of 2019, the only designs that have flown in space have been the Genesis I, Genesis II, and Bigelow Expandable Activity Module from Bigelow Aerospace.

== See also ==
- Planetary surface construction
- Austere Human Missions to Mars
- Colonization of the Moon
- Category:Human habitats
- Human outpost (artificially created controlled human habitat)
- Inflatable Antenna Experiment
