= Genesis I (space habitat) =

Experimental uncrewed space habitat

- Image from one of the seven exterior cameras on Genesis I
- Mission type: Experimental uncrewed space station
- Operator: Bigelow Aerospace
- COSPAR ID: 2006-029A
- SATCAT no.: 29252
- Mission duration: 6 months (planned); 2.5 years (achieved); 19 years, 8 months and 28 days (in orbit)

Spacecraft properties
- Spacecraft: Space station
- Spacecraft type: Genesis
- Manufacturer: Bigelow Aerospace
- Launch mass: 1,360 kg (3,000 lb)
- Dimensions: 4.40 m (14.4 ft) in length 2.54 m (8 ft 4 in) in diameter 11.50 m^{3} (406 cu ft) of volume 51.70 kPa (7.498 psi) interior pressure

Start of mission
- Launch date: 12 July 2006, 14:53:36 UTC
- Rocket: Dnepr
- Launch site: Dombarovsky, Russia
- Contractor: Yuzhmash

End of mission
- Disposal: Reentry
- Destroyed: July 2, 2025

Orbital parameters
- Reference system: Geocentric orbit
- Regime: Low Earth orbit
- Perigee altitude: 470 km (290 mi)
- Apogee altitude: 480 km (300 mi)
- Inclination: 64.52°
- Period: 94.84 minutes

Genesis I was an experimental space habitat designed and built by the private American firm Bigelow Aerospace and launched in 2006. It was the first module to be sent into orbit by the company, and tested various systems, materials and techniques related to determining the viability of long-term inflatable space structures through 2008. Such structures, including this module and others built by Bigelow Aerospace, were similar to the 1990s NASA expandable TransHab design, which aimed to provide increased interior volume at a reduced launch diameter and potentially reduced mass compared to traditional rigid structures.

The on-board systems transmitted data for 2.5 years.

== Spacecraft history ==
Genesis I was launched on 12 July 2006 at 14:53:36 UTC aboard an ISC Kosmotras Dnepr launch vehicle, launched from Dombarovsky missile base near Yasny, Orenburg Oblast, Russia. Spacecraft control was transferred to Bigelow Aerospace at 15:08 UTC after a successful orbital insertion. Designed as a one-third scale model of the full size BA 330, when in orbit the main body of the craft measures 4.40 m (14.4 ft) long and 2.54 m (8 ft 4 in) in diameter, with an interior habitable volume of 11.5 m^{3} (410 cu ft). As part of the expandable design, however, the module launched with a diameter of only 1.60 m (5 ft 3 in), inflating to its full size after entering orbit. The expansion process took approximately ten minutes.

Genesis I suffered a major radiation event in December 2006 as a result of a "solar storm". Mission controllers were able to restart the system in time, though the situation was described as being "one fault away from the spacecraft being dead". Despite this, no lasting damage occurred and the spacecraft was continuing to operate in "excellent shape" in March 2007.

The spacecraft completed its 10,000th orbit on 8 May 2008, some 660 days after launch. By that time, Genesis I had traveled more than 430 million kilometers (270 million miles), the equivalent of going to the Moon and back 1,154 times, and had taken more than 14,000 images, including images of all seven continents. Its electrical equipment had been continuously powered since it first became operational.

Although the design life of the spacecraft avionics was only six months, the avionics systems worked flawlessly for "over two and a half years" before failure. The data received after the first six months was a re-verification of the validation test suite that was accomplished during the design life period.

In February 2011, Bigelow reported that the vehicle had "performed flawlessly in terms of pressure maintenance and thermal control-environmental containment".

The orbital life was originally estimated to be 12 years, with a gradually decaying orbit resulting in re-entry into the atmosphere of Earth and burn-up expected. Its operations lasted approximately 2.5 years, significantly longer than its expected 6-month mission duration.

After 18 years, Genesis I re-entered Earth's atmosphere July 2, 2025.

== Systems ==
Genesis I was outfitted with eight GaAs solar panel arrays, four on each end of the craft, which produced 1000 watts total power and maintained a 26 volt battery charge. It carried thirteen cameras, seven externally to monitor the physical condition of the spacecraft, such as the outer shell and solar arrays, and six internally to photograph the various objects and experiments. Internal systems established an atmospheric pressure of 51.7 kPa (7.50 psi) and used passive thermal control to keep temperatures at an average of 26 °C (79 °F), with observed limits of approximately 4.5 °C (40.1 °F) and 32 °C (90 °F). Genesis I used a single gas tank for its inflation system, and guidance/stabilization control was performed using a network of torque rods, Sun sensors, GPS and a magnetometer.

== Payload ==
Aside from the various systems and monitoring equipment, Genesis I was orbiting with a wide variety of cargo. Bigelow employees contributed numerous photographs, toys, cards and other items, which were seen in still images floating around the cabin. Bigelow also placed a life sciences experiment on board, which contained four Madagascar hissing cockroaches (Gromphadorhina portentosa) and approximately 20 so-called Mexican jumping beans, which are seeds containing the live larva of the moth Cydia saltitans. In addition, the company allowed NASA to include a prototype for the GeneSat series of nanosatellites. This device, called GeneBox, tested the systems and procedures that will be used on future GeneSat missions. While GeneBox carried no living organisms, future flights will use sensors and optics to measure how weightlessness affects genes and the genetic activity of cells and microscopic life.

== See also ==
- Galaxy (spacecraft), a space habitat concept by Bigelow
- Genesis II
- Inflatable space habitat
- Sundancer, a space habitat concept by Bigelow
- Timeline of private spaceflight
