= Prevention of an Arms Race in Outer Space =

1981 United Nations resolution

The Prevention of an Arms Race in Outer Space document is a 1981 UN resolution that reaffirms the fundamental principles of the 1967 Outer Space Treaty and advocates for a ban on the weaponization of space."

The Ad Hoc PAROS Committee (Cttee) is a subsidiary body to the Conference on Disarmament (CD). In 1985 after much diplomatic discussion, agreement was reached on the Cttee mandate at the CD. For many years, the mandate of Cttee was renewed annually instead of it having a permanent mandate, owing to diplomatic disagreement. The Cttee mandate wording limited it, and it was not a proper "negotiating forum". The Cttee mandate was to examine:

- Issues related to the prevention of an arms race in outer space;
- Existing agreements governing space activities;
- Existing proposals and future initiatives on the Prevention of an Arms Race in Outer Space.

On 28 October 2009, the CD "adopted draft resolution A/C.1/64/L.25 entitled Prevention of an Arms Race in Outer Space. The draft resolution was adopted by a vote of 176 in favor, none against, and two abstentions (the United States and Israel)."

On December 4, 2014, the General Assembly of the UN passed two resolutions on preventing an arms race in outer space:

- The first resolution, Prevention of an Arms Race in Outer Space, "call[s] on all States, in particular those with major space capabilities, to contribute actively to the peaceful use of outer space, prevent an arms race there, and refrain from actions contrary to that objective." There were 178 countries that voted in favour to none against, with 2 abstentions (Israel, United States).
- The second resolution, No first placement of weapons in outer space, emphasises the prevention of an arms race in space and states that "other measures could contribute to ensuring that weapons were not placed in outer space." 126 countries voted in favour to 4 against (Georgia, Israel, Ukraine, United States), with 46 abstentions including EU member States.
