= Bigelow Commercial Space Station =

Private space station designed by Bigelow Aerospace

The Bigelow Next-Generation Commercial Space Station was a private orbital space station under conceptual development by Bigelow Aerospace in the 2000s and 2010s. Previous concepts of the space station had included multiple modules, such as two B330 expandable spacecraft modules as well as a central docking node, propulsion, solar arrays, and attached crew capsules. However it was also suggested that each B330 can operate as an independent space station. Attaching a B330 to the International Space Station or flying a B330 alone have been suggested by Robert Bigelow.

On 8 April 2016, NASA launched a Bigelow inflatable module and attached it to the ISS, where it has been tested for over four years.

== History ==
Early work at Bigelow Aerospace on expandable space habitats, with plans to eventually assemble them into on-orbit space stations, began in the early years after the company was formed in 1999. By 2004, plans made public included assembly of multiple modules "into a manned space facility in low Earth orbit for both privately- and publicly-funded research and for space tourism."

Two more formal concepts have since been made public. By 2005, Bigelow space station plans had been further conceptualized into Commercial Space Station Skywalker, or CSS Skywalker. In mid-2010, Bigelow announced their Next-Generation Commercial Space Station—later named "Space Complex Alpha".

The initial dates for the Alpha complex were not achieved. In January 2013, the Alpha complex was specified to be an in-space assemblage of only two B330 modules, with the first module to be launched no earlier than 2016.

=== CSS Skywalker ===
CSS Skywalker
Station statistics
- Crew: 5–7
- Mass: 100,000 kg (220,000 lb)
- Height: 30.0 m (98.4 ft)
- Diameter: 6.7 m (22 ft)
- Pressurised volume: 1,500 m^{3} (53,000 cu ft)

The CSS Skywalker (Commercial Space Station Skywalker) was a 2005 concept for the first "space hotel" by Bigelow Aerospace. The Skywalker was designed to be composed of multiple Nautilus (B330) habitat modules, which would be inflated and connected upon reaching orbit. An MDPM (Multi-Directional Propulsion Module) would allow the Skywalker to be moved into interplanetary or lunar trajectories.

In short, CSS Skywalker was "an effort to build the planet's first orbiting space hotel, [with a projected] room rate of USD$1 million per night", and a hoped-for launch date for the first Nautilus module of 2010.

=== Company challenges ===
Early assessments of the probability of success of the technology development and challenges of a commercial space station pointed to the importance of factors largely beyond Bigelow's control. For example, in 2005, John M. Logsdon, director of George Washington University's Space Policy Institute, said, "I have little doubt that the basic technology is likely to work ... The issue is whether there's a transportation system that can get people, things, or both, up there."

In practice, orbital launch plans were significantly delayed. First, after the Space Shuttle Columbia disaster in 2003, Bigelow had to compete with NASA for rides on the Russian Soyuz three-person rocket — "a distinctly untenable position." In mid-2009, Bigelow announced they were continuing to develop a variety of space habitat architectures.

=== Space transport ===
In 2008, Bigelow initially began talks with Lockheed Martin to potentially contract launch services on its Atlas V-401 vehicle for both crew and cargo launches.

By mid-2010, Bigelow was actively pursuing launch options for its space station modules and crew capsules from two launch systems: the Boeing CST-100 capsule on a ULA Atlas V launcher and also the SpaceX Dragon / Falcon 9 capsule/launcher combination. "Bigelow offers Boeing, SpaceX, and other vehicle developers ... the promise of a sustained, large market for space transportation services." With the initial Space Complex Alpha, Bigelow "would need six flights a year; with the launch of a second, larger station, that number would grow to 24, or two a month." After 2010, no further concrete plans have been announced for transport with Atlas V launch vehicles.

In May 2012, almost simultaneously with the successful mission of SpaceX's Dragon capsule, launched by SpaceX's Falcon 9 vehicle, to the International Space Station, Bigelow and SpaceX jointly announced that they were teaming to offer private crewed missions to space, promoting the Bigelow space station and SpaceX transport systems.

In 2014, plans called for transport of humans and resupply cargo to the station to be via a SpaceX Dragon V2, with a round-trip seat priced at US$26.5 million. Lease of the on-orbit stations was priced at US$25 million to rent one-third of a B330 module for 60 days. The B330 modules and any of several tugs were planned for launch aboard a Falcon Heavy launch vehicle.

== Space Complex Alpha ==
Space Complex Alpha

Station statistics
- Crew: Up to 12
- Pressurised volume: 690 m^{3} (24,000 cu ft)

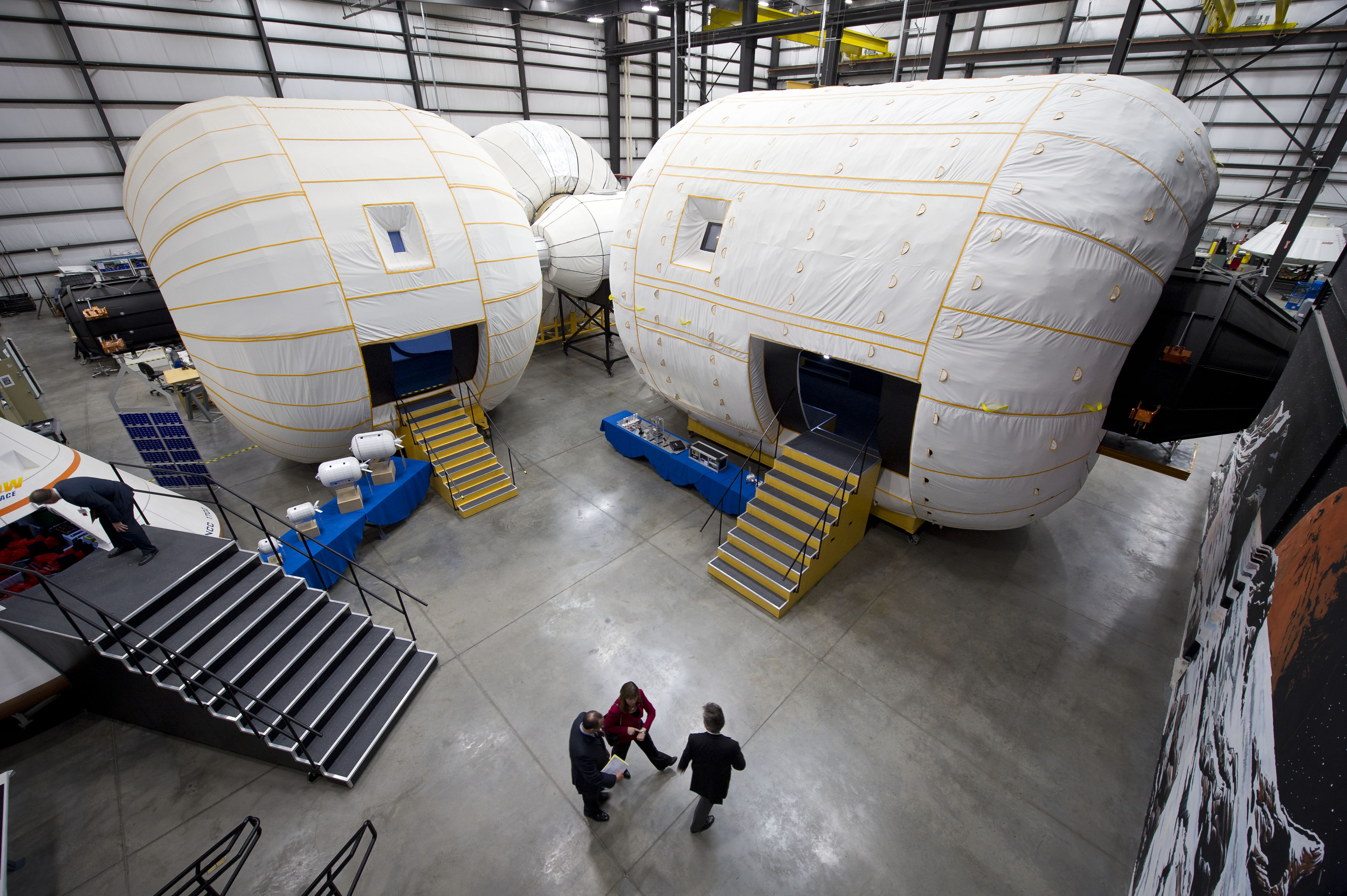
A full-scale mockup of Bigelow Aerospace's Space Station Alpha inside their Nevada facility

The Bigelow Next-Generation Commercial Space Station was announced in mid-2010. The initial configuration for the 2014/2015 space assembly was two Sundancer modules and one B330 module, named Space Complex Alpha after October 2010.

Bigelow began to publicly refer to the initial configuration—two Sundancer modules and one B330 module— of the first Bigelow station as Space Complex Alpha in October 2010. If the entire station is leased out, it could mean up to 25 Launches per year for crew and cargo. In early 2013, Bigelow Aerospace started referring to Alpha as consisting of two B330 modules instead of two Sundancer and one B330.

In October 2010, Bigelow announced that it has memorandum of understanding with six sovereign nations to utilize the on-orbit facilities of the commercial space station: United Kingdom, Netherlands, Australia, Singapore, Japan and Sweden. A seventh country signed on in February 2011: the United Arab Emirates

In August 2015, Michael Gold stated that the timetable for the first B330 deployment is uncertain at the moment since it is tied to the development of private astronaut taxis that can get people to orbit. With this projected to be 2017 or later Bigelow expects to be "ready when they are".

In April 2016, the two B330s attached together were also questioned, by suggesting that the first B330 might ideally be attached to the International Space Station or that each B330 could operate on its own. The first liftoff was targeted for 2020. All flights are currently on hold due to the temporary lay off of all Bigelow employees due to the COVID-19 Pandemic.

=== Orbital complex construction ===
In 2010, Bigelow Aerospace began building a large production facility in North Las Vegas, Nevada to produce the space modules. The 16,800 m^{2} (181,000 ft^{2}) facility will include three production lines for three distinct spacecraft, doubling the amount of floor space at Bigelow and transitioning the focus from research and development to production. Bigelow expects to hire approximately 1200 new employees to staff the plant, with production commencing in early 2012. Construction would require three medium lift launches and one heavy lift launch. In October 2011, Reuters reported that Bigelow had "pared its 115-member workforce to 51 [...] because of delays developing space taxis needed to fly people to the outposts."

As of 2010 On-orbit assembly of the Bigelow Next-Generation Commercial Space Station components was projected to begin in 2014. As of July 2010, construction of the orbital complex was projected to occur in seven principal steps, based on an operations concept that included the on-orbit addition of two Sundancer modules and one B330 module.

- Unit 1: Sundancer-one module, with a pressurized volume of 180 cubic meters (m^{3}), (unoccupied)
- Unit 2: Commercial crew capsule arrives with Bigelow Aerospace astronauts to set up Sundancer-one and carry additional supplies
- Unit 3: Supplemental power bus and docking node
- Unit 4: Sundancer-two
- Unit 5: Second commercial crew capsule brings additional crew and supplies, and provides a redundant method for crew return to Earth.
- Unit 6: B330, larger-volume module (330 m^{3})
- Unit 7: Third commercial crew capsule brings additional supplies and provides a double-redundant, robust solution for astronaut re-entry.

== Commercial leasing ==
In January 2013, Bigelow announced that they would sell naming rights to the dual-B330-module Alpha complex for US$25 million per year.

In 2014, Bigelow announced that prices for human access to the space station were expected to be US$26.25 million aboard a SpaceX Dragon, or US$36.75 million aboard a Boeing CST-100.

The price for a two-month lease of one-third of a module (approximately 110 cubic metres (3,900 cubic feet)) was provisionally set at US$25 million.

== Technical ==
=== Docking system ===
As of 2007, Bigelow was planning to equip its expandable space modules with both a Soyuz-style docking system on one end and a NASA-standard Low Impact Docking System on the other. The available docking port options for the Next Generation Commercial Space Station have not yet been released.

=== Test program ===
The "human-in-the-loop testing of the environmental control and life support system (ECLSS)" for Sundancer began in October 2010.

By January 2013, the Bigelow Expandable Activity Module (BEAM) pressurised module was under development by Bigelow Aerospace, being purchased by NASA for attachment to the International Space Station. The BEAM arrived at the ISS on April 10, 2016, was berthed to the station on April 16, and was expanded and pressurized on May 28, 2016. The initial plan was to test the expandable habitat technology for at least two years. During its flight mission, NASA has been testing and monitoring the module's structural integrity, leak rate, radiation dosage and temperature changes. The module has been performing well, and in October 2017, it was announced that the module would stay attached to the ISS until 2020, with options for two further one-year extensions. The module is being used to store up to 130 cargo transfer bags in an effort to free up additional space aboard the station.

== Launch planning ==
Potential launch options are in the mid-heavy lift launch system class of launch vehicles, where Bigelow has now negotiated arrangements with two commercial launch providers. As of January 2013, both SpaceX—using the Falcon 9/Dragon— and United Launch Alliance/Boeing—using the Atlas V/CST-100—have signed to deliver launch services to Bigelow Space Station Alpha.

In February 2011, Bigelow announced that it would begin launching its unmanned space station modules in 2014 from Cape Canaveral using Atlas V launch vehicles.

In addition to the Atlas launches for the expandable modules, Bigelow had reserved a single 2014 Launch on the SpaceX Falcon 9 rocket, but that launch had not taken place as of early 2019. As of August 2011, press reports indicate that Bigelow will launch at least some of their crews to the station on the human-rated Atlas V utilizing the Boeing CST-100 seven-person space capsule.

In April 2016, Bigelow signed an agreement with United Launch Alliance to launch the first B330 module in 2020 using an Atlas V rocket.

In October 2017, Bigelow Aerospace and United Launch Alliance (ULA) announced they were working together to launch a B330 expandable module on ULA's Vulcan launch vehicle. The launch would place a B330 module in Earth orbit, and after outfitting it would be boosted to low lunar orbit by two further Vulcan ACES launches by the end of 2022 to serve as a lunar depot. As this announcement stated that only a Vulcan had the performance and fairing capacity needed to launch a B330, it appears that any Atlas V launches would be for crew rather than B330 modules. The timeline may be 'aspirational' as ULA have indicated that the Vulcan will transition to using the ACES upper stage around 2024.

== Long-term proposals ==
In late 2010, Bigelow indicated that the company would like to construct ten or more space stations and that there is a substantial commercial market to support such growth.

=== Future space station concepts ===
Space Complex Bravo

Station statistics
- Crew: Up to 24
- Pressurised volume: 1,320 m^{3} (47,000 cu ft)

In 2010, Bigelow said that second orbital station—Space Complex Bravo—was scheduled to begin launches in 2016 and go into commercial operation in 2017. This complex would consist of four B330 modules.

Bigelow has publicly shown space station design configurations with up to nine B330 modules containing 2,800 m^{3} (100,000 ft^{3}) of habitable space. The conceptual configurations are listed below.

- Advanced Medical Facility (3000 m^{3}) - Nine B330 modules, three propulsion buses with docking node, three crew capsules.
- Biological Containment Station Low Earth Orbit (2800 m^{3} habitable, 660 m^{3} remotely controlled)
- Biological Research Station Low Earth Orbit (2000 m^{3})
- Deep Space Complex (1320 m^{3}) - Four B330 modules, nine propulsion buses with docking node and three docking ports.
- Lunar Depot Ares (990 m^{3}) - Three B330 modules, four propulsion buses with docking nodes. The entire station would land directly onto the moon. It is intended to hold 12 astronauts but is capable of holding 18. Near the lunar base there would be a solar array field. A model of this concept has been built.
- Mars Exploration (1320 m^{3}) - Four B330 modules, three propulsion buses with docking node.
- Resupply Depot Hercules (8300 m^{3}) - Announced Oct 2010 Six B330 modules, three BA 2100 modules, nine propulsion buses with docking node and three crew capsules.

== See also ==
- Bigelow Expandable Activity Module, an experimental module currently berthed to the ISS
- CST-100
- International Space Station
- Orbital Technologies Commercial Space Station
- Skylab II
- TransHab, intended for ISS
