= Genesis II (space habitat) =

Experimental uncrewed space habitat

- Artist rendering of Genesis II
- Mission type: Experimental uncrewed space station
- Operator: Bigelow Aerospace
- COSPAR ID: 2007-028A
- SATCAT no.: 31789
- Mission duration: 6 months (planned); 2.5 years (achieved); 19 years, 3 months and 10 days (in orbit)

Spacecraft properties
- Spacecraft: Space station
- Spacecraft type: Genesis
- Manufacturer: Bigelow Aerospace
- Launch mass: 1,360 kg (3,000 lb)
- Dimensions: 4.40 m (14.4 ft) long 2.54 m (8 ft 4 in) in diameter 11.50 m^{3} (406 cu ft) of volume 51.70 kPa (7.498 psi) of pressure

Start of mission
- Launch date: 28 June 2007, 15:02:20 UTC
- Rocket: Dnepr
- Launch site: Dombarovsky, Russia
- Contractor: Yuzhmash

End of mission
- Destroyed: Uncontrolled reentry on September 2, 2025

Orbital parameters
- Reference system: Geocentric orbit
- Regime: Low Earth orbit
- Perigee altitude: 446 km (277 mi)
- Apogee altitude: 512 km (318 mi)
- Inclination: 64.5°
- Period: 94.92 minutes

Genesis II was the second experimental space habitat designed and built by the private American firm Bigelow Aerospace, launched in 2007. As the second module sent into orbit by the company, this spacecraft built on the data and experience gleaned from its previously orbited sister-ship Genesis I. Like its sister-ship and other modules designed by Bigelow Aerospace, this spacecraft was based on the NASA TransHab design, which provided increased interior volume and reduced launch diameter along with potentially reduced mass compared to traditional rigid structures.

Genesis II was "retired" when its avionics systems stopped working after two and a half years, thus becoming a derelict spacecraft. It reentered on September 2, 2025.

== Spacecraft history ==
Similar to the process endured by Bigelow for Genesis I, transporting Genesis II to Russia for launch was the end result of nearly a year of regulatory processes due to restrictions imposed by International Traffic in Arms Regulations (ITAR) and other procedures, both in the United States and abroad. After leaving North Las Vegas, Nevada in the United States, the spacecraft made a stopover in Luxembourg before being flown on an Antonov An-124 to Orsk, Russia, and transported over ground to the Dombarovskiy base. Genesis II made its final move into the Assembly, Integration and Test Building on 29 March 2007. Originally slated for a 6 August 2006 launch, ISC Kosmotras delayed the launch to 30 January 2007, due to the failure of a Dnepr rocket in July 2006. The launch was delayed an additional four times (1 April 2007, 19 April 2007, 26 April 2007, and 23 May 2007) due to technical and scheduling reasons before its eventual launch on 28 June 2007 at 15:02:20 UTC.

As with Genesis I, it was launched aboard an ISC Kosmotras Dnepr rocket from Dombarovsky Air Base near Yasny, Orenburg Oblast, Russia. It successfully reached orbit after separation from the rocket at 15:16 UTC. Due to the mechanics of its orbit, first contact with the craft was established once it passed over SpaceQuest, Ltd.'s Fairfax, Virginia receiving station at 22:20 UTC, confirming that it was functioning nominally with power and air pressure at expected levels. Externally, Genesis II is identical in size to Genesis I; as such, it is a one-third scale of the full-size BA 330 model, with on-orbit measurements of 4.40 m (14.4 ft) in length and 2.54 m (8 ft 4 in) in diameter, with an interior habitable volume of 11.50 m^{3} (406 cu ft). As part of its inflatable design, Genesis II launched with a diameter of 1.60 m (5 ft 3 in), expanding to its full size after entering orbit. Within two days of launch, attitude control systems had damped all rotation and oriented antennae toward Earth.

On 12 December 2007, Bigelow Aerospace provided an update indicating that Genesis II was in good health. All cameras had been tested and more than 4,000 photographs had been taken. The craft was in a nearly circular orbit with an eccentricity of 0.028, and had only lost 5 km (3.1 mi) from launch to that time. Attitude control systems and all eight solar arrays were operational, and no damage to the outer surface of the craft was observed. Internal pressure was noted as holding between 69.60 and 72.40 kPa (10.095 and 10.501 psi), with the variation caused by Genesis II moving in and out of sunlight during its orbit.

On 23 April 2009, Bigelow Aerospace announced that Genesis II had surpassed the 10,000 orbit mark, having been in space for 665 days and travelling over 430×10^{6} km (270×10^{6} mi).

In February 2011, Bigelow reported that the vehicle had "performed flawlessly in terms of pressure maintenance and thermal control-environmental containment". Although the design life of the spacecraft avionics was only six months, the avionics systems worked flawlessly for over two and a half years before failure. The data received after the first six months was a re-verification of the validation test suite that was accomplished during the design life period.

On 17 September 2019, an alert was generated by the U.S. Air Force stating that there was a 5.6% chance that Genesis II would collide with another derelict satellite, the Soviet satellite Kosmos 1300.

On September 2, 2025 the orbit decayed and the spacecraft re-entered the atmosphere.

== Systems ==
Genesis II featured a number of improvements over Genesis I. In addition to the standard guidance control systems used on Genesis I, it had reaction wheel assemblies and a precision measurement system, which were used to affect the spacecraft's rotation rate and angular momentum without expending fuel. It carried 22 cameras (nine more than the 13 on Genesis I) for photographing and filming cargo and ship conditions both inside and out. Some of these were on articulated platforms, and one wireless camera that is capable of additional exterior imaging. Instead of the single-tank inflation system used on the first prototype craft, Genesis II employed multiple tanks for added reliability and to allow for more finely tuned gas control.

Additional layers were added to the outer shield for increased protection and thermal management. Finally, the on-board sensor suite was enhanced with additional sensors for pressure, temperature, attitude control, and radiation detection, which would help determine the impact of the orbital environment on the integrity of shipboard systems. Genesis II did not carry any propulsion.

== Payload ==
On both the interior and exterior, Genesis II carried several non-critical systems for scientific, commercial and entertainment purposes.

For the science aspect, Genesis II carried an upgraded version of the original life-sciences module, colloquially termed "Life in a Box". This module includes habitats for three organisms: the Madagascar hissing cockroach, previously carried aboard Genesis I; the South African flat rock scorpion, Hadogenes troglodytes; and a colony of seed-harvester ants, Pogonomyrmex californicus, along with the queen ant for long-term colonization possibilities. This biobox system included automated food and water delivery systems, and fans keep fresh air available by circulating internal air with that inside the rest of the spacecraft. Sensors and cameras were intended to monitor the health and activities of the biobox inhabitants, and images of the interior were intended for display on Bigelow's website.

There were two commercial payloads included on Genesis II. The first was the "Fly Your Stuff" program, which allowed individuals and customers to send photographs and other small items into orbit for a fee. Several dozen of these objects were launched, and were later photographed and filmed by cameras in the spacecraft and posted on the Bigelow website for the customers to view. By December 2007, all objects launched as part of this program had been photographed and distributed to customers.

A secondary payload is the external image projection system that tested the capability for flashing images and messages on the spacecraft's hull. Two projectors and associated cameras were positioned on the tips of solar arrays, and the company had eventual plans for allowing the public to send images and video to be displayed. As of August 2007, there were no firm plans on how this would be handled due to current limits of uplink bandwidth, and was considered merely an experimental "fun" project.

For entertainment, Genesis II carried a "Space Bingo" game intended to foster public interest in the program.

== See also ==
- Bigelow Expandable Activity Module
- Galaxy (spacecraft)
- Sundancer
- B330
- Inflatable space habitat
