= Sundancer =

- Concept art of the Sundancer module

Station statistics
- Crew: 3 ^{(1)}
- Launch: never launched^{(2,3)}
- Mission status: Cancelled
- Mass: 8,618.4 kg (19,000 lb) ^{(1)}
- Length: 8.7 m (28.5 ft) ^{(4)}
- Diameter: 6.3 m (20.7 ft) ^{(4)}
- Pressurised volume: 180 m^{3} (6,357 cu ft) ^{(1)}
- Orbital inclination: 40.0 degrees ^{(1)}
- Typical orbit altitude: 463 km (288 mi) ^{(1)}

Sundancer was the proposed third prototype space habitat intended to be launched by Bigelow Aerospace—and the first human-rated expandable module based on TransHab technology acquired from NASA. It was to have been used to test and confirm systems used in the company's commercial space station efforts during the early 2010s, and if successful, would have formed the first piece of the proposed commercial space station.

While Sundancer had been under construction at the Bigelow plant in North Las Vegas, Nevada, the company announced in July 2011 that Sundancer had been removed from their station evolution path, and that the B330 would become the first production module.

== Spacecraft history and future ==
Upon its original announcement, Sundancer was intended to be the fourth module orbited by Bigelow Aerospace. In August 2007, however, it was announced that due to rising space launch costs and the level of success of the first two Bigelow modules launched, the third development module, Galaxy, would not be put into space and the Sundancer program would be accelerated. The life support and other advanced systems intended for space testing on Galaxy, and potentially the spacecraft itself, would still be built and used for ground testing.

Sundancer was intended for launch aboard the SpaceX Falcon 9 rocket, but a launch date has been continually pushed back. In 2007, it was reported that Sundancer would be in orbit by 2010, with such a date confirmed by SpaceX. By March 2008 this launch slot had slipped to 2011, by 2010 had again slipped to 2014, and by July 2011 the Sundancer had been cancelled such that the B330 would become the first production module.

Sundancer was to spend its first six to nine months on-orbit in a checkout configuration to test systems, followed by crewed shakedown missions when transport vehicles become available. If these crewed missions prove successful, Bigelow plans to use Sundancer as the starting point of the first commercial space complex. The company intended to launch a combined propulsion bus and central node to dock with Sundancer, followed by two full-size B330 modules which would connect to the central node. This station would potentially be followed by several more similar stations. As of 2005, it was estimated that a one-week trip to the complex would be priced at US$7.9 million.

== Systems and configuration ==
Sundancer would be equipped with full life support systems, attitude control, orbital maneuvering systems, and will be capable of reboost and deorbit burns. Like the Genesis pathfinders, Sundancer will launch with its outer surface compacted around its central core, with air expanding it to its full size after entering orbit. After expansion, the module will measure 8.7 meters (28.5 ft) in length and 6.3 meters (20.7 ft) in diameter, with 180 cubic meters (6,357 cu ft) of habitable interior volume. Unlike previous Bigelow craft, it will feature three observation windows, and will be equipped with a Soyuz-type docking system on one end of the craft and a NASA-developed International Low Impact Docking System on the other.

Sundancer's propulsion system will initially be used to boost the module into a high orbit for long duration testing and will later lower it back into an orbit reachable by crewed spacecraft. The module utilizes a redundant propulsion design for its attitude control and de-orbit systems, with each propulsion system featuring a different form of propellant. Aerojet provided the hypergolic Aft Propulsion System (APS), with Andrews Space building the APS electronic controllers. Dynetics, formerly Orion Propulsion, created the Forward Propulsion System (FPS), which uses hydrogen and oxygen by-products from the Sundancer life support system.

Bigelow Aerospace is also considering an option to include lights on the exterior of the spacecraft, potentially visible from Earth, which would be a furtherance of the projection system currently flying aboard Genesis II. Robert Bigelow noted in an interview that "if you have some blue and green and amber-colored lighting going on, you would have something that really has a lot of blink to it."

== Launch vehicle ==
Due to the added size and mass of Sundancer over previous modules, the craft would have required a medium-lift launch vehicle to take it into orbit. SpaceX was contracted to provide a Falcon 9 vehicle for a launch in 2014. Bigelow had also entered discussion with Lockheed Martin regarding the possible use of the Atlas V as a launch vehicle for crewed space capsules, which would be required to deliver crew, tourists and materiel to the new habitat.
