= Bigelow Aerospace =

American space technology company

Coordinates: 36.212°N 115.167°W

- Company type: Private
- Industry: Aerospace
- Founded: 1998; 28 years ago
- Founder: Robert Bigelow (Founder and President)
- Defunct: 2020; 6 years ago
- Headquarters: North Las Vegas, Nevada, United States
- Key people: Robert Bigelow, Blair Bigelow
- Products: Orbital facilities, commercial space stations
- Number of employees: Unknown
- Website: bigelowaerospace.com

Bigelow Aerospace was an American space design and manufacturing company which ceased operations in 2020. It was an aeronautics and outer space technology company which manufactured and developed expandable space station modules. Bigelow Aerospace was founded by Robert Bigelow in 1998, and was based in North Las Vegas, Nevada. It was funded in large part by the profit Bigelow gained through his ownership of the hotel chain Budget Suites of America.

The company built two unmanned free-flying prototypes that flew in 2006 and 2007 and a module attached to the International Space Station. Bigelow Aerospace announced in 2010 that they intended to create a modular set of space habitats for creating or expanding space stations. By 2013, Bigelow had invested US$250 million in the company. Bigelow stated on a number of occasions that he was prepared to fund Bigelow Aerospace with about US$500 million through 2015 in order to achieve launch of full-scale hardware.

In March 2020, the company laid off all 88 of its employees due to the COVID-19 pandemic. As of January 2024 the company remains dormant and is currently considered defunct.

== History ==
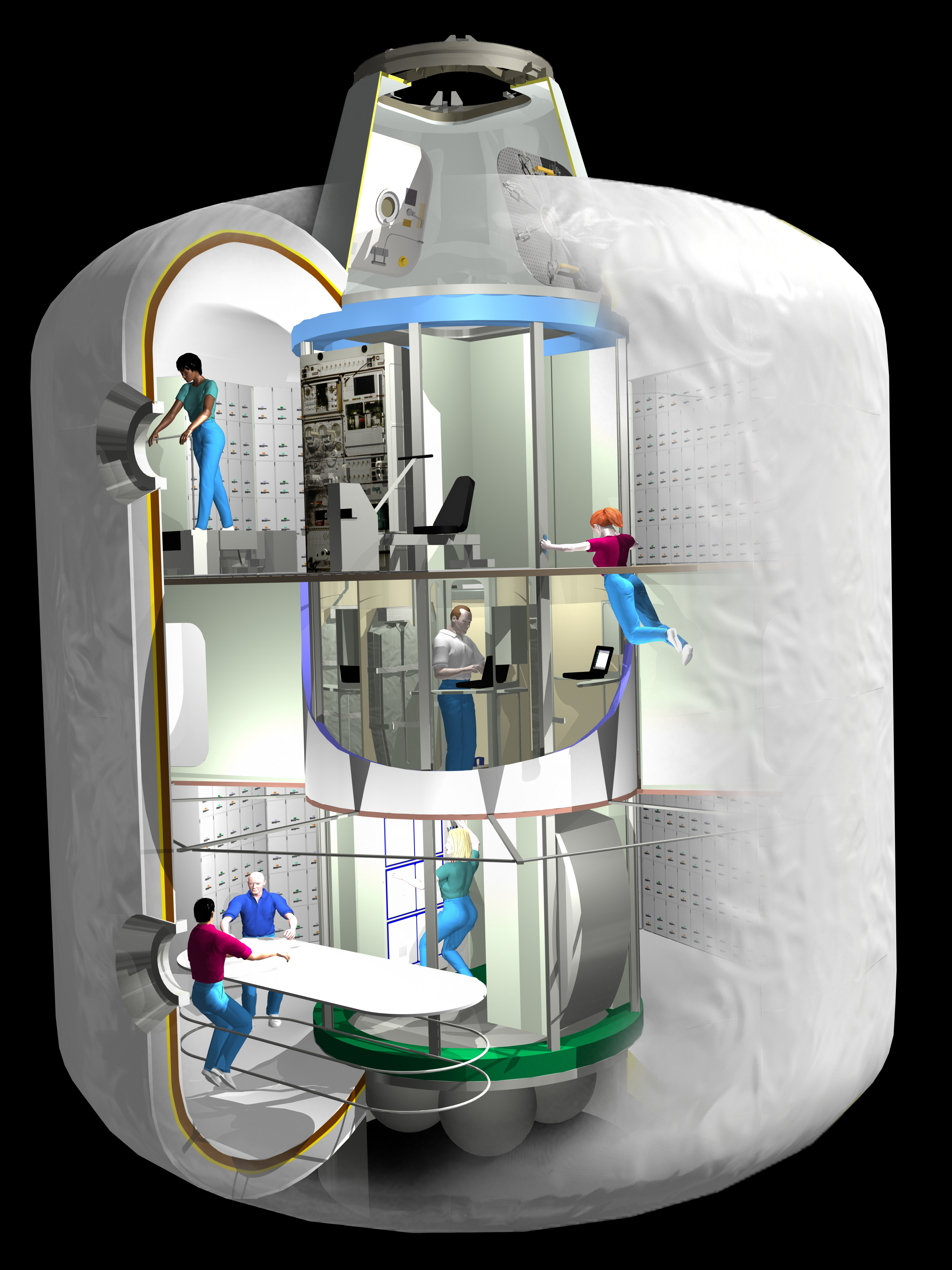
NASA's design for the now-canceled TransHab module

Bigelow originally licensed the multi-layer, expandable space module technology from NASA in 2000 after Congress canceled the International Space Station (ISS) TransHab project following delays and budget constraints in the late 1990s.

Bigelow has three Space Act agreements whereby Bigelow Aerospace is the sole commercializer of several of NASA's key expandable module technologies.

Bigelow continued to develop the technology for a decade, redesigning the module fabric layers – including adding proprietary extensions of Vectran shield fabric, "a double-strength variant of Kevlar" – and developing a family of uncrewed and crewed expandable spacecraft in a variety of sizes. Bigelow invested US$75 million in proprietary extensions to the NASA technology by mid-2006, and US$180 million into the technology by 2010.

By 2010, Robert Bigelow had invested US$180 million in the company, which by 2013 had grown to US$250 million of his personal fortune. Bigelow stated on multiple occasions that he was prepared to fund Bigelow Aerospace with up to about US$500 million through 2015 in order to achieve launch of full-scale hardware.

In early 2010, NASA came full circle to once again investigate "making inflatable space-station modules to make roomier, lighter, cheaper-to-launch spacecraft" by announcing plans in its budget proposal released 22 February 2010. NASA considered connecting a Bigelow expandable craft to the ISS for safety, life support, radiation shielding, thermal control and communications verification testing for the next three years", and in December 2012, signed a US$17.8 million contract with Bigelow to develop the Bigelow Expandable Activity Module (BEAM), then projected to fly in 2015. The module was berthed to the International Space Station on 16 April 2016, and was inflated on 28 May 2016. As of June 2022 it remains at the station.

Since early on, Bigelow had been intent on "pursuing markets for a variety of users including biotech and pharmaceutical companies and university research, entertainment applications and government military and civil users". The business model includes "'leasing out' small space stations or habitats made of one or more [B330] inflatable modules to different research communities or corporations". Despite these broad plans for space commercialization, the space tourism destination and space hotel monikers were frequently used by many media outlets following the 2006/2007 launches of Genesis I and Genesis II. Robert Bigelow has been explicit that he is aiming to do business in space in a new way, with "low cost and rapid turnaround, contrary to traditional NASA ISS and Space Shuttle operations and bureaucracy".

In October 2010, Bigelow announced that it had agreements with six sovereign nations to utilize on-orbit facilities of the commercial space station: UK Astronomy Technology Centre (United Kingdom), Netherlands Space Office (Netherlands), Defence South Australia (Australia), Singapore Government Technology Development Agency (Singapore), Japan Manned Space Systems Corporation, chairman is a previous director of JAXA (Japan) and Swedish National Space Board (Sweden). In February 2011, Dubai of the United Arab Emirates became the seventh nation to have signed on.

In 2011, Bigelow employed an in-house team of model makers, coming from the film and architecture industries, to make detailed models of their space habitats and space stations. Scale models were sent to "potential customers, including governments and corporations, as a reminder of the possibilities".

Reportedly due to delays in launch capability to transport humans to low Earth orbit, Bigelow dramatically reduced staff in late September 2011, because crew transportation would not become available until "years after the first B330 could be ready", laying off 40 of their 90 employees.

In late March 2012 Bigelow began increasing staff levels once again. By April 2013, Bigelow said that they would have B330 modules ready to go to space by the time that commercial passenger spacecraft were available to ferry their customers to the dual–BA330 Alpha space station – expected in 2017 – and that Bigelow was ready to enter into contracts with customers.

Further staff reductions occurred at the start of 2016, estimated by industry sources to be between 30 and 50 people of 150 employed at the time of the layoffs. This came after the company advertised more than 100 jobs in 2015 at both its North Las Vegas headquarters and its newly established propulsion department in Huntsville, Alabama. As part of its reduction in workforce, the company closed the Huntsville facility.

In February 2018, the company announced the formation of a new subsidiary, Bigelow Space Operations, to handle operational aspects of marketing and operating space stations in low Earth orbit.

In March 2020, the company laid off all of its employees, 88 in total.

In December 2021, Bigelow transferred ownership of BEAM to NASA's Johnson Space Center.

=== NASA lawsuit ===
Bigelow Aerospace is known for its innovative work on inflatable space habitats. Bigelow Aerospace entered into a contract with NASA. The contract was to supply an expandable habitat module for the International Space Station (ISS). This module is known as the Bigelow Expandable Activity Module (BEAM). The BEAM was successfully launched and attached to the ISS in 2016. In March 2021, Bigelow Aerospace filed a lawsuit against NASA. Bigelow Aerospace claimed that NASA owed the company $1.05 million. The lawsuit alleged that NASA had not paid the full amount stipulated in the contract. The contract was related to work Bigelow Aerospace had completed. The dispute centered around NASA's refusal to pay Bigelow Aerospace for its contributions to the BEAM project. Bigelow Aerospace contended that it had met all the required milestones and deliverables under the contract. However, NASA had not fulfilled its payment obligations. The company argued that NASA's failure to pay the agreed-upon amount had caused significant financial strain. This was especially the case as the company was already facing challenges due to the COVID-19 pandemic and a broader downturn in the space industry. NASA contested Bigelow Aerospace's claims. The agency said it had already paid the company for the completed work under the contract. Bigelow Aerospace had not met the criteria for additional payments, according to NASA. NASA argued that they had fulfilled the contract terms on their side. The remaining funds were not owed to the company, NASA stated.

== Module design and business plans ==
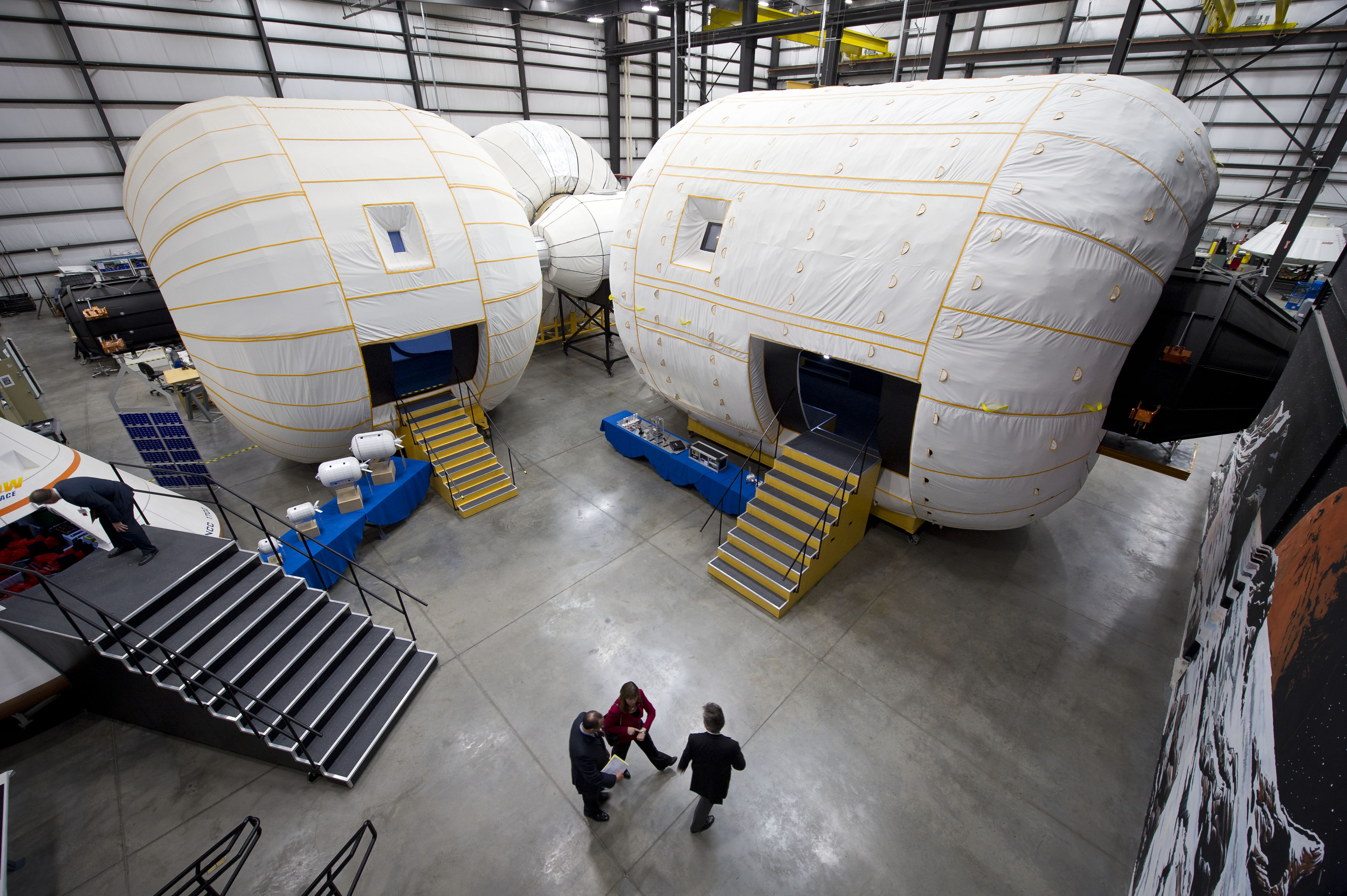
A full-scale mockup of Bigelow Aerospace's Space Station Alpha inside their facility in Nevada

=== Expandable module design overview ===
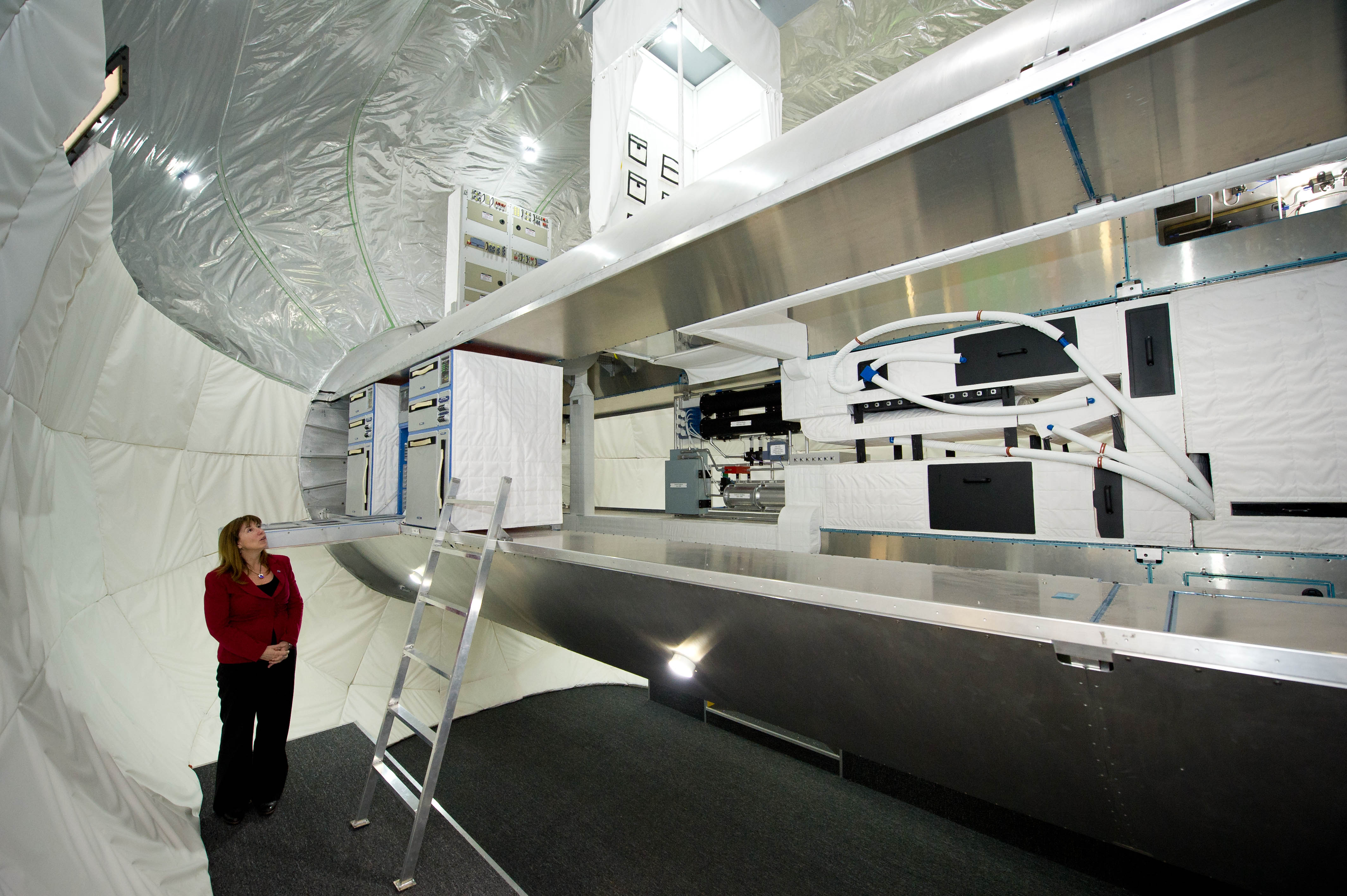
NASA Deputy Administrator Lori Garver views the inside of a full-scale mockup of Bigelow Aerospace's Space Station Alpha.

Bigelow Aerospace anticipates that its inflatable modules will be more durable than rigid modules. This is partially due to the company's use of several layers of Vectran, a material twice as strong as Kevlar, and also because, in theory, flexible walls should be able to sustain micrometeoroid impacts better than rigid walls. In ground-based testing, micrometeoroids capable of puncturing standard ISS module materials penetrated only about halfway through the Bigelow skin. Operations director Mike Gold commented that Bigelow modules also wouldn't suffer from the same local shattering problems likely with metallic modules. This could provide as much as 24 hours to remedy punctures in comparison to the more serious results of standard ISS skin micrometeoroid damage.

Expected uses for Bigelow Aerospace's expandable modules include microgravity research and development and space manufacturing. Other potential uses include variable – gravity research – for gravity gradients above microgravity including Moon (0.16 g) and Mars (0.38 g) gravity research; space tourism – such as modules for orbital hotels; and space transportation – such as components in spaceships for Moon or Mars crewed missions.

=== Business plans ===
As of October 2015 the Bigelow Aerospace website shows several pricing schemes including US$51.25 million for 60 days on a B330 space station. That price covers everything including transport, training, and consumables. For US$25 million Bigelow Aerospace customers can lease a third of a B330 habitat, roughly 110 cubic meters, for a period of 60 days.

In 2010, Bigelow proposed conceptual designs for expandable habitats that would be substantially larger than the B330, previously its largest at 330 m^{3} (12,000 cu ft) habitat volume. Contingent on NASA going forward with a super heavy lifter, the proposed concept would include "expandable habitats offering 2,100 cubic meters [74,000 cubic feet] of volume – nearly twice the capacity available on the International Space Station", and another providing 3,240 m^{3} (114,000 cu ft).

In 2010, Bigelow Aerospace began building a large production facility in North Las Vegas, Nevada to produce the space modules. The 181,000 ft^{2} (16,800 m^{2}) facility will include three production lines for three distinct spacecraft, doubling the amount of floor space at Bigelow, and transitioning the focus from research and development, with an existing workforce of 115, to production. Bigelow expected to hire approximately 1,200 new employees to staff the plant, with production commencing in early 2012.

In 2013, during execution of the contract to build the Bigelow Expandable Activity Module for the International Space Station, Robert Bigelow indicated that his company manufactures about 50% of product content in-house, while subcontracting out the remainder.

In March 2013, Bigelow signed an agreement with NASA to act as "the central link between NASA and dozens of private companies that want to play a role in the creation of a new economy – a space economy, including proposals far more complex than mere space tourism: research, manufacturing, medicine and agriculture. The agreement calls for Bigelow to liaise between NASA and the private sector to see how the U.S. government and industry could help each other".

The first deliverable on that contract, a "report which identifies companies that want to be a part of this effort, as well as potential customers", was delivered by Bigelow to NASA in May 2013.

== Modules ==
On 12 July 2006, and 28 June 2007, Bigelow launched the Genesis I and II modules, respectively. In mid-2008, Bigelow Aerospace completed the Galaxy module but did not launch it due to rising launch costs and the ability to substantially validate the new Galaxy technologies terrestrially, particularly after the successful two Genesis launches in 2006 and 2007. It was tested on the ground at its North Las Vegas facility instead.

As of 2014, Bigelow had reserved a 2015 launch on SpaceX's Falcon 9 rocket, but did not announce the payload. The Falcon 9 would have been capable of launching a Sundancer module, but not a B330 module. Bigelow also talked with Lockheed Martin regarding potential launches on the Atlas V-401 launch vehicle. No launch took place in 2015, although in April 2016 Bigelow Aerospace remained on SpaceX's list of future launch customers. On 8 April 2016, the SpaceX CRS-8 mission launched BEAM to the ISS; on 11 April 2016, Bigelow and United Launch Alliance announced that an Atlas V-552 rocket had been booked for a flight in 2020 to deliver a B330 habitat to low-Earth orbit.

Note: Current as of July 2021. Dates of upcoming launches are proposed and are subject to change.

Module Type	Module Names	Volume	Launch Date	Launch Vehicle	Status
Orbital Test Module	Genesis I	11.5 m^{3} (410 cu ft)	12 July 2006, 14:53 UTC	Dnepr	Launch successful; Decayed in 2025
Orbital Test Module	Genesis II	11.5 m^{3} (410 cu ft)	28 June 2007, 15:02 UTC	Dnepr	Launch successful; Decayed in 2025.
Ground Test Article	Galaxy/Guardian	16.7 m^{3} (590 cu ft)	Cancelled in 2008	—N/a	Launch cancelled; used for tests on ground only.
Orbital Station Module	B180 Sundancer	180 m^{3} (6,400 cu ft)	Cancelled in 2011	Falcon 9 (planned)	Replaced by B330 "Nautilus", will launch on Atlas V instead of Falcon 9.
Orbital Module docked to ISS	Bigelow Expandable Activity Module (BEAM)	16 m^{3} (565 cu ft)	8 April 2016, 20:43 UTC	Falcon 9 Dragon	Launch successful; currently (2022) operational, docked to ISS in orbit. Development began December 2012, built under a US$17.8 million NASA contract. Cleared to remain docked to the ISS until 2031.
Orbital Station Module	B330 Nautilus	330 m^{3} (12,000 cu ft)	Cancelled in 2020	Atlas V 552	Cancelled when Bigelow shut down in 2020.
Orbital Module docked to ISS	Expandable Bigelow Advanced Station Enhancement (XBASE)	330 m^{3} (12,000 cu ft)	Cancelled in 2020	TBA (Atlas V or Vulcan)	Cancelled.
Space Station Core Module	BA 2100 Olympus	2,100 m^{3} (74,000 cu ft)	Cancelled in 2020	Vulcan	Cancelled.
Lunar Surface Station Module	B330 First Base	330 m^{3} (12,000 cu ft)	Cancelled in 2020	TBA	Cancelled; mockup unveiled in June 2019.

=== Expandable habitat modules ===
==== Genesis I ====
On 12 July 2006, Genesis I launched on a Dnepr booster from Dombarovsky Cosmodrome in Orenburg Oblast, Russia. The launch was conducted by Bigelow and ISC Kosmotras. Despite ground-side difficulties during launch, the spacecraft performed as expected upon reaching orbit, inflating, deploying solar arrays and starting internal systems. The mission was planned to last for five years and included extensive observation of the craft's performance including testing packing/deployment procedures and resistance to radiation and space debris, among other space hazards and conditions. Mike Gold, corporate counsel for Bigelow Aerospace, stated in relation to this mission and the next, "Our motto at Bigelow Aerospace is 'fly early and often'. Regardless of the results of Genesis 1, we will launch a follow-up mission rapidly". On July 2nd, 2025 Genesis I was destroyed when it reentered earth's atmosphere.

==== Genesis II ====
On 28 June 2007, Genesis II launched on another Dnepr (a converted SS-18 ICBM) from Dombarovsky Cosmodrome in Orenburg Oblast, Russia. Launched at 08:02 PDT, Genesis II was inserted into orbit at 08:16 PDT at an inclination of 64.0°.

Although Genesis I and Genesis II were identical in size and similar in appearance there were several notable differences. Genesis I contained 13 video cameras whereas Genesis II contained 22. Genesis II also included a suite of additional sensors and avionics not present in Genesis I.

The orbital life was estimated to be 12 years, with a gradually decaying orbit resulting in destruction upon re-entry into Earth's atmosphere on September 2nd, 2025.

Fly your stuff program

Bigelow Aerospace ran a Fly Your Stuff program for the Genesis II launch. The cost to launch pictures or small items was around US$300. Bigelow photographed each item with internal cameras as the items floated inside the craft, displaying them on the company website.

The first image of the interior of Genesis II appeared on the company's website on 29 June 2007. Some of the pictures and other items placed aboard Genesis II as part of the Fly Your Stuff program are clearly visible. Another interior image, apparently taken with more of the spacecraft's internal lights activated, was posted on 2 July 2007. Articles from the Fly Your Stuff program are also visible in this image.

Test items, supplied by Bigelow Aerospace employees, were sent into orbit on Genesis I. No new images of items floating inside Genesis I were released since shortly after the launch and initial activation of the spacecraft due to problems with a computer which controlled several of the internal cameras.

==== Sundancer ====
The third planned Bigelow launch, Sundancer, was to be equipped with full life-support systems, attitude control, orbital maneuvering systems, and would have been capable of reboost and deorbit burns. Like the Genesis pathfinders, Sundancer's outer surface would have been compacted around its central core, with air expanding it to its full size after entering orbit. After expansion, the module would have measured 8.7 m (29 ft) in length and 6.3 m (21 ft) in diameter, with 180 m^{3} (6,400 cu ft) of interior volume. Unlike previous Bigelow craft, it was planned to have three observation windows. As of September 2009, SpaceX had been contracted to provide a Falcon 9 vehicle for launch of a Bigelow payload in 2011.

In July 2011, Bigelow announced that they will cease development on the Sundancer and instead focus their efforts on the B330.

==== Bigelow Expandable Activity Module for the ISS ====
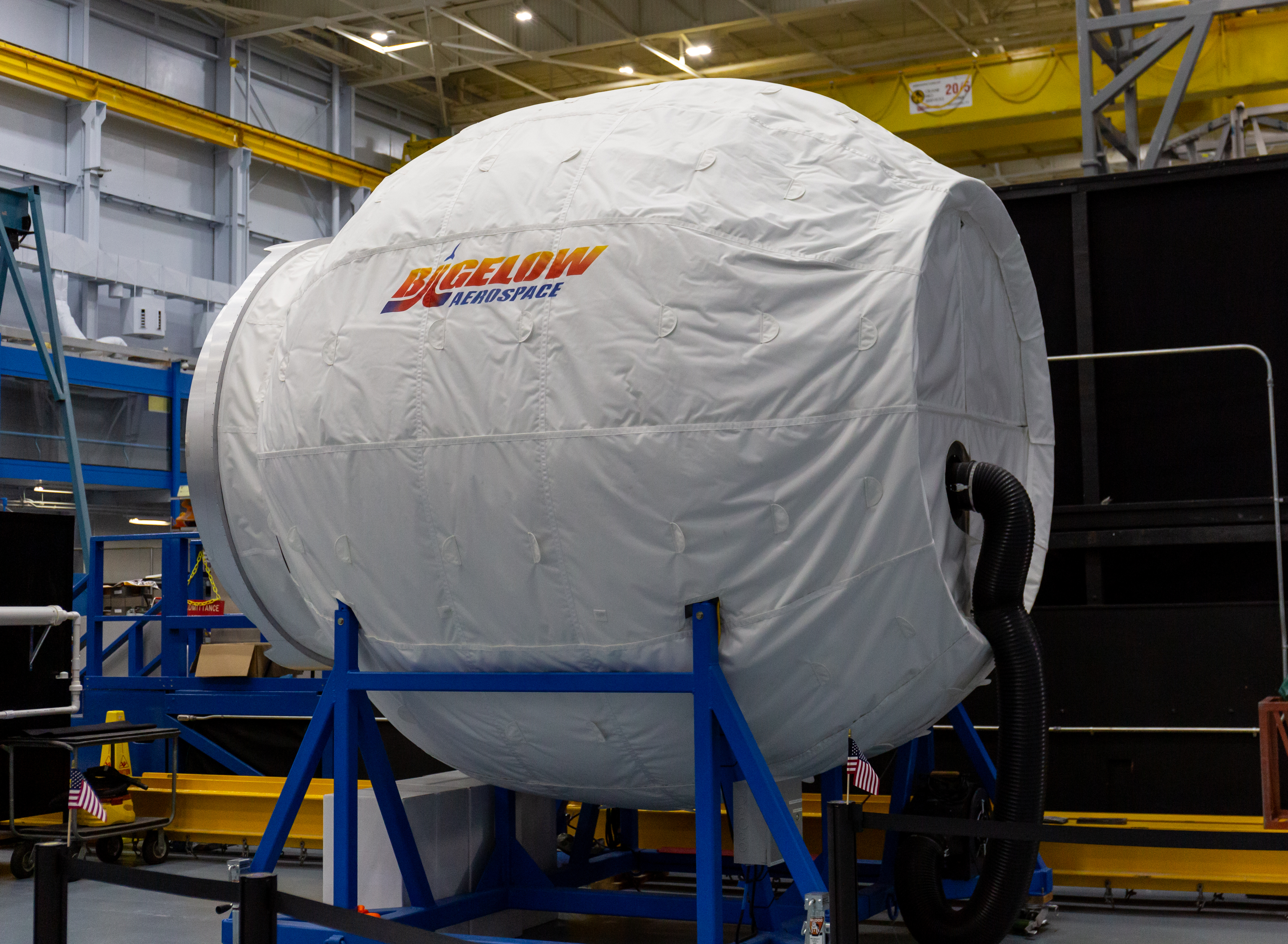
Full-scale mock-up of a BEAM at the Johnson Space Center Space Vehicle Mockup Facility

In December 2012, Bigelow began development work on the Bigelow Expandable Activity Module (BEAM) under a US$17.8 million NASA contract. After a number of delays, BEAM was transported to ISS arriving on 10 April 2016, inside the unpressurized cargo trunk of a SpaceX Dragon during the SpaceX CRS-8 cargo mission. The mission tested the BEAM module's structural integrity, leak rate, radiation dosage and temperature changes over a two-year-long mission. At the end of BEAM's mission, the module was planned to be removed from the ISS and burn up during reentry. In October 2017, it was announced that the module would stay attached to the ISS for at least three more years, with options for two further one-year extensions.

==== B330 ====
The B330 was a full-scale production module weighing approximately 50,000 lb (23,000 kg), with dimensions of approximately 45 ft (14 m) in length and 22 ft (6.7 m) in diameter when expanded. Previous names for the B330 were the BA 330 and the Nautilus.

Bigelow had partnered with United Launch Alliance with the goal of launching a B330 module to orbit in 2021, potentially as an addition to the International Space Station. The two companies had also proposed launching a B330 to low lunar orbit in 2022 to serve as a lunar depot. The first B330 launch was originally planned to be launched aboard an Atlas V launch vehicle, but ULA stated in October 2017 that its in-development Vulcan Centaur launch vehicle was the only launch vehicle available with the performance and fairing capacity to carry the module.

==== BA 2100 concept module ====
The BA 2100, or Olympus module, was a concept module that would require a heavy-lift launcher and would place in orbit the complete infrastructure of a 2,100 m^{3} (74,000 cu ft) habitat, over six times as large as the B330. As of October 2021, estimates put the vehicle mass between 90 and 120 metric tonnes, with a diameter of approximately 12 m (39 ft). The concept model shows 7 m (23 ft) docking ports at both ends.

==== First Base ====
In June 2019, Bigelow Aerospace introduced the "First Base" concept. First Base would have been a 330 m^{3} (12,000 cu ft) lunar station module that could accommodate four people; it would have featured four airlocks and two warehouses with solar arrays on top.

=== Delays in launch capability ===
As a result of delays in launch capability to transport humans to the Bigelow habitats, Bigelow "laid off some 40 of its 90 employees" in late September 2011. Bigelow had expected human launch capability by 2014 or 2015 but "the prospect of domestic crew transportation of any kind is apparently going to occur years after the first B330 could be ready. ... For both business and technical reasons, we cannot deploy a B330 without a means of transporting crew to and from our station, and the adjustment to our employment levels was necessary to reflect this reality".

== Bigelow Commercial Space Station ==
The Bigelow Next-Generation Commercial Space Station was a private orbital space complex that was under development by Bigelow. The space station would have included both Sundancer and B330 expandable spacecraft modules and a central docking node, propulsion, solar arrays, and attached crew capsules. Initial launch of space station components was planned for 2014, with portions of the station to be available for leased use as early as 2015. Bigelow had publicly shown space station design configurations with up to nine B330 modules containing 100,000 cu ft (2,800 m^{3}) of habitable space. Bigelow began to publicly refer to the initial configuration – two Sundancer modules and one B330 module – of the first Bigelow station as "Space Complex Alpha" in October 2010.

A second orbital station, Space Complex Bravo, was scheduled to begin launches in 2016.

Launches for the station would not commence until there were commercial crew transportation systems operational, which was expected to be 2017 or later.

Bigelow announced in October 2010 that it has agreements with six sovereign nations to utilize on-orbit facilities of the commercial space station: United Kingdom, Netherlands, Australia, Singapore, Japan and Sweden. By February 2011, this number had risen to seven.

An earlier space station, CSS Skywalker (Commercial Space Station Skywalker), was Bigelow's 2005 concept for the first space hotel. The Skywalker was to be composed of multiple Nautilus habitat modules, which would be expanded and connected upon reaching orbit. An MDPM (Multi-Directional Propulsion Module) would allow the Skywalker to be moved into interplanetary or lunar trajectories.

In November 2010, Bigelow indicated that the company would like to construct ten or more space stations and that there was a substantial commercial market to support such growth.

== Crew and passenger transport ==
Bigelow's business model requires a means of transporting humans to and from low Earth orbit. In 2004, Bigelow established and funded a US$50 million prize, America's Space Prize, to stimulate development of crewed vehicles. The prize expired without a winner in early 2010.

In August 2009, Bigelow Aerospace announced the development of the Orion Lite spacecraft, intended to be a lower cost, and less capable version of the Orion spacecraft under development by NASA. The intention would be for Orion Lite to provide access to low earth orbit using either the Atlas V or Falcon 9 launch systems, and carrying a crew of up to 7.

At the time Bigelow Aerospace's corporate counsel Mike Gold said: "...we would be foolish to depend completely on one capsule provider or any single launch system", ... "Therefore, it is vital from both a practical and business perspective to ensure that SpaceX and Dragon aren't the only options available to us, hence the need for another capsule".

As of 2010, Bigelow was pursuing both launch options of Boeing CST-100 / ULA Atlas V and SpaceX Dragon / Falcon 9 as capsules and launchers. "Bigelow offers Boeing, SpaceX, and other vehicle developers ... the promise of a sustained, large market for space transportation services". With the initial Space Complex Alpha space station, Bigelow "would need six flights a year; with the launch of a second, larger station, that number would grow to 24, or two a month".

Bigelow entered NASA's Commercial Crew Program (CCP) with the Starliner capsule in collaboration with Boeing. Bigelow worked with Boeing to refine requirements for Starliner, including joint tests in August 2012. Separately, in May 2012, Bigelow and SpaceX teamed up towards joint marketing to international customers of crew transport to the Bigelow B330 space facility.

== Aspirations beyond Earth-orbit ==
In February 2010, following the announcement of NASA's post-Augustine Commission plans to reorient human-to-orbit plans more in the direction of commercial launch providers, Robert Bigelow said "We as a company have lunar ambitions, ... and we also have Mars ambitions as well". In April 2010, Bigelow suggested positioning a space station at the Lagrange point L_{1}. He also said his proposed private Moon Base would consist of three B330s.

In March 2013, Bigelow signed a contract with NASA to "look at ways for private ventures to contribute to human exploration missions, perhaps including construction of a moon base" and to act as a clearinghouse with other commercial companies to extend commercial activity at conceptual lunar expeditionary bases in ways that are not a mainline part of NASA's current focus for human spaceflight, which is asteroid exploration missions. The Bigelow report released later in 2013 identified "an uncertain regulatory environment as a major obstacle to commercial activities" on the Moon.

In December 2014, the FAA Office of Commercial Space Transportation (AST) completed a review of the proposed Bigelow lunar habitat, and indicated that "it was willing to use its authority to ensure Bigelow could carry out its [lunar] activities ... without interference from other [U.S.] companies licensed by the FAA" [and that the FAA would] use its launch licensing authority, as best it can, to protect private sector assets on the Moon and to provide a safe environment for companies to conduct peaceful commercial activities without fear of harmful interference from other AST licensees".

== Honors ==
Bigelow Aerospace has received several honors for its spaceflight efforts. On 3 October 2006, Bigelow Aerospace received the Innovator Award from the Arthur C. Clarke Foundation. The award recognizes "initiatives or new inventions that have had recent impact on or hold particular promise for satellite communications and society, and stand as distinguished examples of innovative thinking". Robert Bigelow was presented the award at the Arthur C. Clarke Awards in Washington, D.C. alongside Walter Cronkite, who was honored on the same night with the Arthur C. Clarke Lifetime Achievement Award.

On 26 January 2007, the Space Foundation announced that Bigelow Aerospace would be the recipient of its 2007 Space Achievement Award. Bigelow Aerospace joins a list of previous winners that include the Titan Launch Vehicle team; The Inertial Upper Stage team, the SpaceShipOne team; the Arianespace-CNES Ariane 4 launch team; the Evolved Expendable Launch Vehicle (EELV) teams; the NASA/Industry Galileo space probe team; the Hubble Space Telescope team; Sea Launch; and the NASA/Boeing International Space Station team. The award was presented to Robert Bigelow on 9 April 2007 at the 23rd National Space Symposium in Colorado Springs, Colorado.

== See also ==
- Axiom Space
- Blue Origin
- List of private spaceflight companies
- Space Adventures
- Space architecture
