= B330 =

Space habitat designed by Bigelow Aerospace

- Rendering of the B330

Station statistics
- Crew: 6
- Launch: planned: 2021 (cancelled)
- Carrier rocket: Atlas V
- Mission status: Developmental
- Mass: 23,000 kg (50,000 lb)
- Length: 16.88 m (55.4 ft)
- Diameter: 6.7 m (22.0 ft) (Note: Internal diameter when expanded.)
- Pressurized volume: 330 m^{3} (11,654 cu ft)

The B330 (previously known as the Nautilus space complex module and BA 330) was an inflatable space habitat privately developed by Bigelow Aerospace from 2010 until 2020. The design was evolved from NASA's TransHab habitat concept. B330 was to have 330 cubic meters (12,000 cu ft) of internal volume, hence its numeric designation.

The craft was intended to support zero-gravity research including scientific missions and manufacturing processes. Beyond its industrial and scientific purposes, however, it had potential as a destination for space tourism and a craft for missions destined for the Moon and Mars.

Several test articles were built and tested in ground test facilities, but no flight versions were built.

== Features ==
Compared to their volume-mass ratio, expandable modules offer more living space than traditional rigid modules. For example, the pressurized volume of a 23-tonne B330 module was 330 m^{3}, compared to 106 m^{3} of the 15-tonne ISS Destiny module. Thus B330 offered 210% more habitable space, with an increase in mass of only 53%.

Bigelow claimed that the module provided radiation protection equivalent to, and ballistic protection superior to, the International Space Station.

The exterior of the craft was 16.88 meters (55 ft) long by 6.7 meters (22 ft) in diameter and the module weighed 23,000 kilograms (50,000 lb).

The habitat was designed with two solar arrays and two thermal radiator arrays for heat dissipation, as well as life support systems to sustain a crew of up to six astronauts. It had "a zero-g toilet with solid and liquid waste collection, semi-private berths for each crew member, exercise equipment, a food storage and preparation station, lighting, and a personal hygiene station."

The wall thickness was approximately 0.46 metres (18 in) with the module fully expanded. The walls had 24 to 36 layers for ballistic protection, thermal protection, and radiation protection, as hard as concrete once the craft was fully expanded. The exterior had four large windows coated with a UV protection film.

Dual-redundant control thruster systems were to be used, one using mono-propellant hydrazine and the other using gaseous hydrogen and gaseous oxygen. The second system was refillable from the on-board environmental control system. Module-specific avionics were included for navigation, re-boost, docking, and other on-orbit maneuvering.

Bigelow Aerospace developed the B330 module to mate with other spacecraft such as Russian Soyuz spacecraft, SpaceX's Dragon V2, Boeing's CST-100 Starliner, and NASA's Orion spacecraft. The module's large size was intended to benefit lunar astronauts or the crews of other long-duration space missions, which had fairly cramped quarters for the several-day flight.

== Technology ==
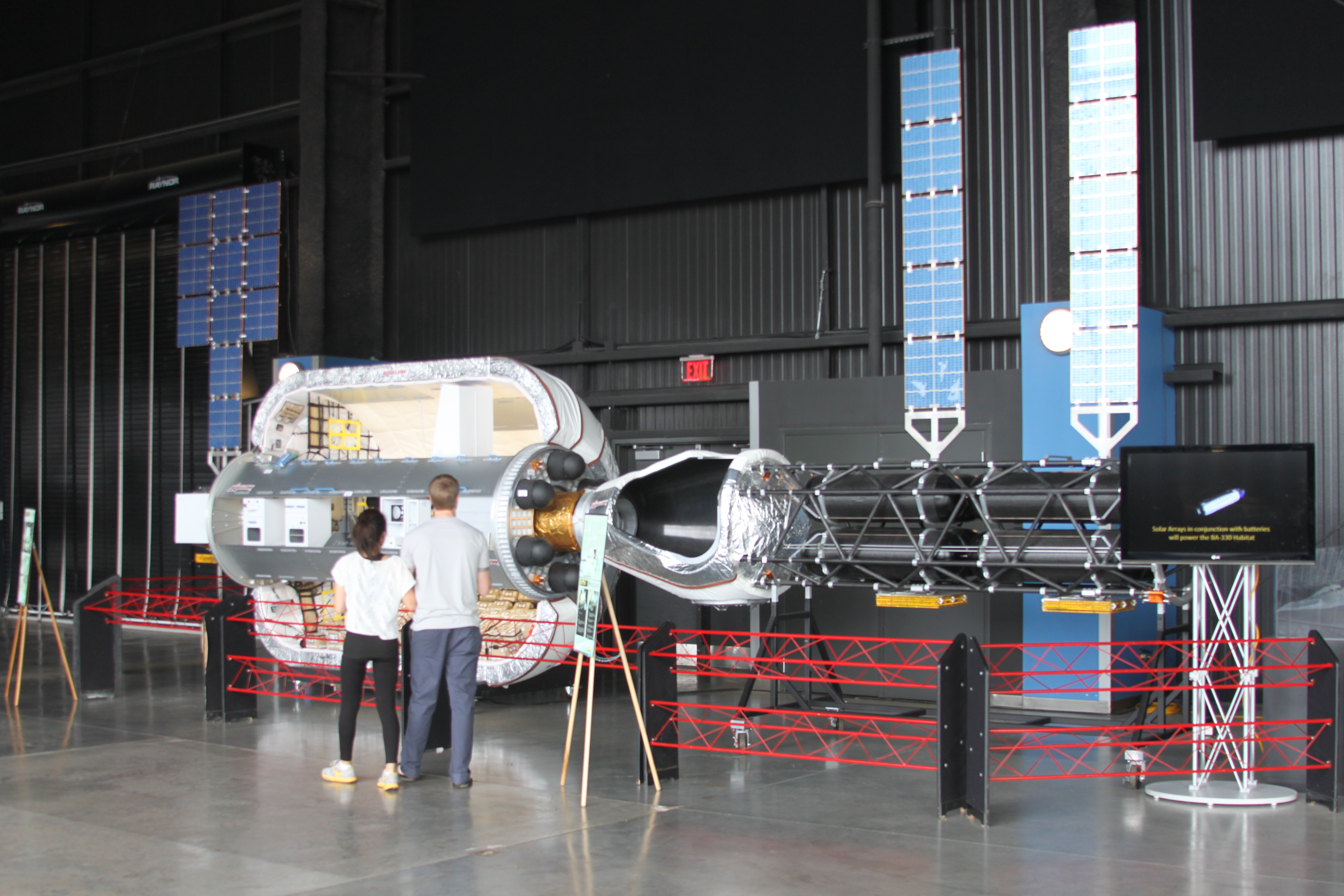
Mock-up of the B330

While details on the purchased TransHab technology have not been published, NASA states the following about the structure of the module that Bigelow adopted as a starting point:

With almost two dozen layers, TransHab's foot-thick inflatable shell is a marvel of innovative design. The layers are fashioned to break up particles of space debris and tiny meteorites that may hit the shell with a speed seven times as fast as a bullet. The outer layers protect multiple inner bladders, made of a material that holds in the module's air. The shell also provides insulation from temperatures in space that can range from +121 °C (+250 °F) in sunlight to −128 °C (−200 °F) in the shade.

The key to the debris protection is successive layers of Nextel, a material commonly used as insulation under the hoods of many cars, spaced between several-inches-thick layers of open cell foam, similar to foam used for chair cushions on Earth. The Nextel and foam layers cause a particle to shatter as it hits, losing more and more of its energy as it penetrates deeper.

Many layers into the shell is a layer of super-strong woven Kevlar that holds the module's shape. The air is held inside by three bladders of Combitherm, material commonly used in the food-packing industry. The innermost layer, forming the inside wall of the module, is Nomex cloth, a fireproof material that also protects the bladder from scuffs and scratches.

— NASA TransHab Concept,

Bigelow has described their technology to news media and have indicated that their proprietary technology inflatable shell, now in validation test in low-Earth orbit in two subscale spacecraft, incorporates a layer of Vectran, along with the Kevlar, etc. of the NASA technology.

== History ==
Its design is based on the cancelled NASA TransHab program. Bigelow gained access to TransHab engineers and workers, some of whom later went on to advise Bigelow's project.

The module follows the launch of two demonstration modules successfully tested in Earth orbit, Genesis I in 2006 and Genesis II in 2007.

As of 2005, Bigelow Aerospace had plans to develop the CSS Skywalker, a space station based upon using B330 modules to act as an orbital hotel. Plans in 2010 continued to call for construction of a space station, but without the CSS Skywalker moniker, with "more usable volume than the existing International Space Station". Those plans included a complex of two smaller Sundancer modules, a combined node and propulsion module and one full-size B330 in order to provide a total volume that was only somewhat less than that of the International Space Station, though built from fewer and larger individual modules.

In early 2010, Bigelow selected Orbitec as the supplier for environmental control and life support systems (ECLSS).

As of February 2010, an initial launch of the B330 was slated to be no earlier than 2015, following a notional launch of the smaller Sundancer habitat in 2014. In July 2010, Bigelow announced that a B330 would be the sixth spacecraft component making up the notional Bigelow Commercial Space Station. The Sundancer development was later halted, with a decision to move directly from the Genesis-series prototypes to the B330.

As of November 2013, Bigelow Aerospace indicated that the company has the financial capacity to produce at least two B330 habitats, along with a couple of transit tugs and a docking node if Bigelow is able to secure commercial customers to pay for approximately half of the launch costs for these systems.

In February 2014, some pricing and other lease details were made public. The B330 lease rate will be US$25 million for one-third of the station—110 cubic metres (3,900 cu ft)—for a 60-day lease and a round-trip taxi-seat to the B330 in low Earth orbit (LEO) on a SpaceX Dragon 2 was projected to be US$26.5 million per seat. At the time, Bigelow indicated that the habitat could be launch-ready by 2017.

Also in 2014, Bigelow announced notional designs for two enhanced B330s, but has explicitly stated that it would need to secure an anchor customer to go forward with building and launching any systems beyond low Earth orbit (BLEO).

- B330-DS for deep space missions to Earth/Moon Lagrange points or for lunar orbital destinations.
- B330-MDS for use on the surface of the Moon or other inner Solar System bodies.

In April 2016, Bigelow signed an agreement with United Launch Alliance (ULA) to launch the first B330 module in 2020 using an Atlas V rocket. In October 2017, Bigelow and ULA announced they are working together to launch a B330 expandable module on ULA's Vulcan launch vehicle. After outfitting in Earth orbit, the B330 will be boosted to low lunar orbit by two further Vulcan ACES launches by the end of 2022 to serve as a lunar depot. The first B330 launch was originally planned to be launched aboard an Atlas V rocket, but ULA stated in October 2017 that its in-development Vulcan rocket was the only launch vehicle available with the performance and fairing capacity to carry the module. The timeline may be 'aspirational' as ULA have indicated that the Vulcan will transition to using ACES upper stage around 2024.

Bigelow ceased all work on the B330 in March 2020 as it laid off its entire 88-person workforce.

== XBASE ==
In August 2016 Bigelow negotiated an agreement with NASA to develop a full-sized ground prototype Deep Space Habitation based on the B330 under the second phase of Next Space Technologies for Exploration Partnerships. The module was called the Expandable Bigelow Advanced Station Enhancement (XBASE), as Bigelow hoped to test the module by attaching it to the International Space Station.

== See also ==
- B2100 (concept)
- Bigelow Expandable Activity Module – Experimental inflatable module – Installed on ISS
- Genesis I – Experimental uncrewed space habitat
- Genesis II (space habitat) – Experimental uncrewed space habitat
- Sundancer (cancelled)
- TransHab (concept, never built)
