= TransHab =

NASA expandable space habitat (1997–2000)

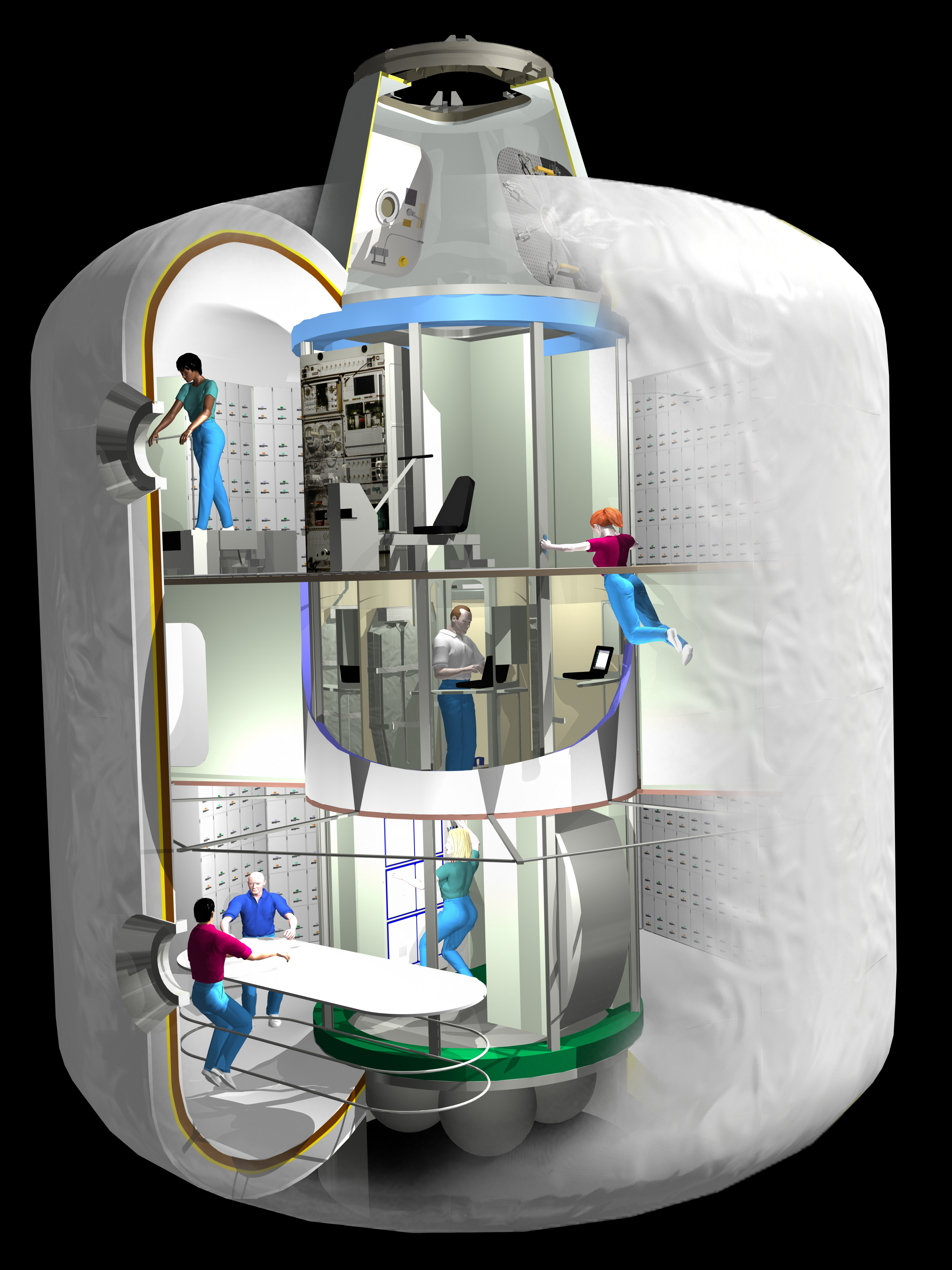
- A cutaway view of a TransHab concept

Module statistics
- Mass: 13,154 kg (29,000 lb)
- Length: 11 m (36 ft)
- Diameter: Packed: 4.3 m (14 ft); Expanded: 8.2 m (27 ft)
- Pressurised volume: Expanded: 339.8 m^{3} (12,000 ft^{3})

TransHab was a program pursued by NASA in the late 1990s to develop the technology for expandable habitats inflated by air in space. TransHab was intended as a replacement for the existing rigid International Space Station crew Habitation Module. When deflated, inflatable modules provide an 'easier to launch' compact form. When fully inflated, TransHab would expand to 8.2 metres (27 ft) in diameter (compare to the 4.4-metre (14 ft) diameter of the Columbus ISS Module).

== History ==
The name of the project is a contraction of Transit Habitat reflecting the original intention to design an interplanetary vehicle to transfer humans to Mars.

Considerable controversy arose during the TransHab development effort due to delays and increased costs of the ISS program. In 1999, the National Space Society issued a policy statement recommending that NASA continue R&D of inflatable technologies while ceasing development of a TransHab ISS module. Finally in 2000, despite objections from the White House, House Resolution 1654 was signed into law banning NASA from conducting further research and development of TransHab. An option to lease an inflatable habitat module from private industry was included in the bill.

The private company Bigelow Aerospace purchased the rights to the patents developed by NASA, but ceased operations in 2020. It pursued a similar scheme for a private space station design. The company has launched the Genesis I, Genesis II, and BEAM pathfinder spacecraft, with plans for additional experimental craft culminating in their BA 330 production model and the Bigelow Commercial Space Station.

== Technology ==
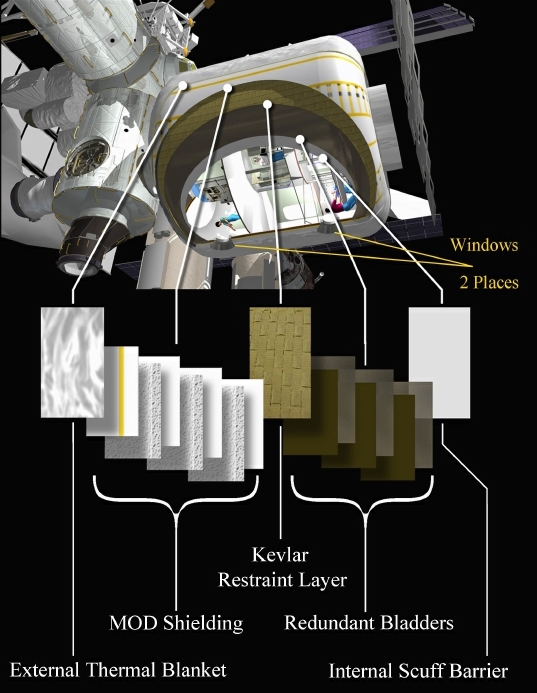
Cut-away view of the TransHab multi-layer, space debris and micrometeoroid ballistic-shield.

The TransHab design called for a hybrid structure that combines the packaging and mass efficiencies of an inflatable structure with the advantages of a load-bearing hard structure.

=== Multi-Layer Inflatable Shell ===
TransHab's inflatable shell consisted of multiple layers of blanket insulation, protection from orbital and meteoroid debris, an optimized restraint layer and a redundant bladder with a protective layer.

TransHab's foot-thick inflatable shell design had almost two dozen layers. The layers were fashioned to break up particles of space debris and tiny meteorites that might hit the shell with a speed seven times as fast as a bullet. The outer layers protect multiple inner bladders, made of a material that holds in the module's air. The shell also provides insulation from temperatures in space that can range from plus 121 degrees Celsius (plus 250 degrees Fahrenheit) in sunlight to minus 128 degrees Celsius (minus 200 degrees Fahrenheit) in the shade.

The key to the debris protection in the design and prototype units was successive layers of Nextel, a material commonly used as insulation under the hoods of many cars, spaced between several-inches-thick layers of open cell foam, similar to foam used for chair cushions on Earth. The Nextel and foam layers cause a particle to shatter as it hits, losing more and more of its energy as it penetrates deeper.

Many layers deep in the shell was a layer of superstrong woven Kevlar to hold the module's shape. The air was held inside by three bladders of Combitherm, a material commonly used in the food-packing industry. The innermost layer, forming the inside wall of the module, was Nomex cloth, a fireproof material that also protected the bladder from scuffs and scratches.

=== TransHab layout ===
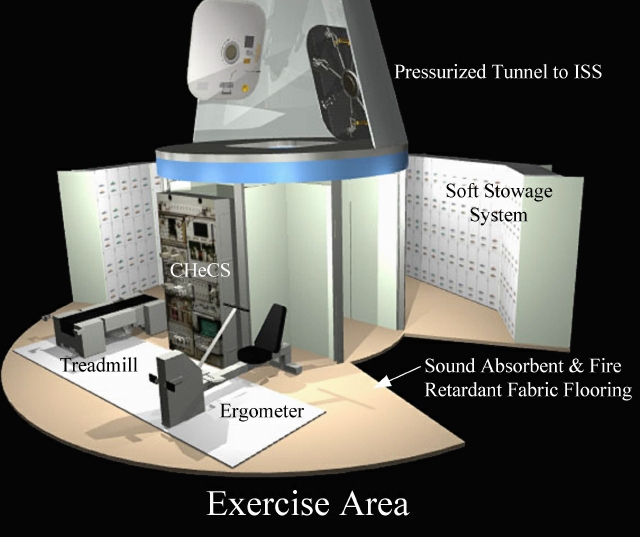
Level 4 and 3

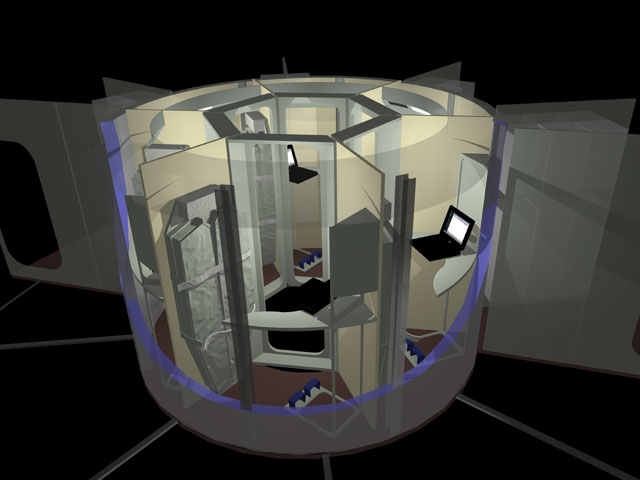
Level 2

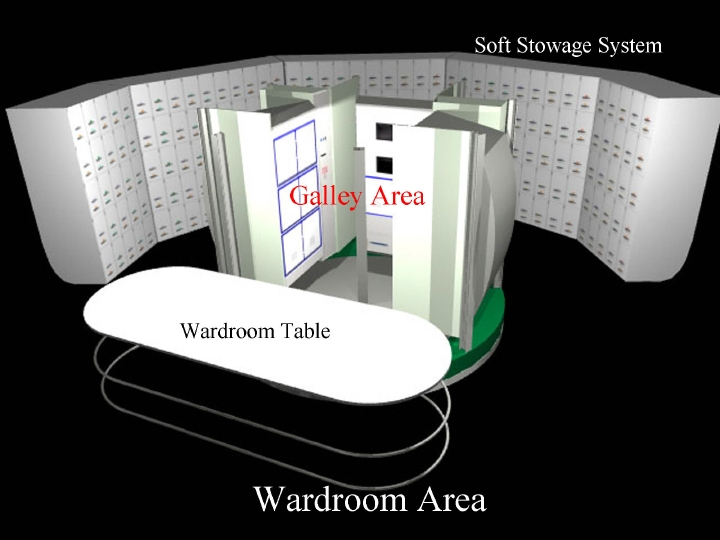
Level 1

TransHab was intended to be composed of four levels/floors.

Level 4
The Pressurized Tunnel Area was intended to provide a passageway between TransHab and any vehicle to which it is attached. The original tunnel design had two standard International Space Station hatches and housed critical equipment required during module expansion, such as avionics and power equipment.

Level 3
Level Three was to house an exercise area with a treadmill and stationary bicycle. The design also contained a complete health care system with all types of medical and emergency equipment and a type of "space bath" area provided for body cleansing. In addition, this level contained a soft stowage area identical to level one.

Crew Health Care Area – The design for the crew health care area incorporated two ISS Crew Health Care System racks, a Full Body Cleansing Compartment, changing area, exercise equipment (treadmill and ergometer), a partitionable area for private medical exams and conferencing, as well as an Earth-viewing window. The Earth-viewing window was to have been 51 centimetres (20 inches) in diameter and was located near the exercise area. The window design had four panes totaling 10.2 centimetres (4.0 inches) thick and a hard frame around each window that attaches to all layers of the shell.

Stowage – Soft-sided cabinets was to have provided stowage for spare parts, supplies, clothing and other equipment. If built, TransHab would have doubled the stowage room available on the International Space Station.

Level 2
Crew Quarters – The crew quarters area design had six individual crew quarters, sized at 2.3 cubic meters (81 ft^{3}) of volume per crew quarter, and a central passageway located within the second level central core structure and water tanks. Each compartment contains a sleeping bag/sleep restraint, an area for stowing personal items, and a computer entertainment center for recreation and personal work.

Mechanical – The mechanical room is external to the core structure and uses only half the floor space. It is acoustically and visually isolated. The other half of this area is a clerestory above the wardroom area. The mechanical room consists of an environmental control and life support system, power equipment and avionics equipment and provides return airflow from Level One and Level Three through openings.

Level 1
The first level was to house a kitchen with a refrigerator-freezer, microwave oven, water dispenser, and food preparation equipment as well as a table that seats 12, enough to allow an entire Station resident crew and replacement crew to sit together for meetings or meals. There were to be three galley racks, a large wardroom table, a soft stowage array and an Earth-viewing window identical to the window on Level 3.

== See also ==
- Bigelow Expandable Activity Module
