= List of space stations =

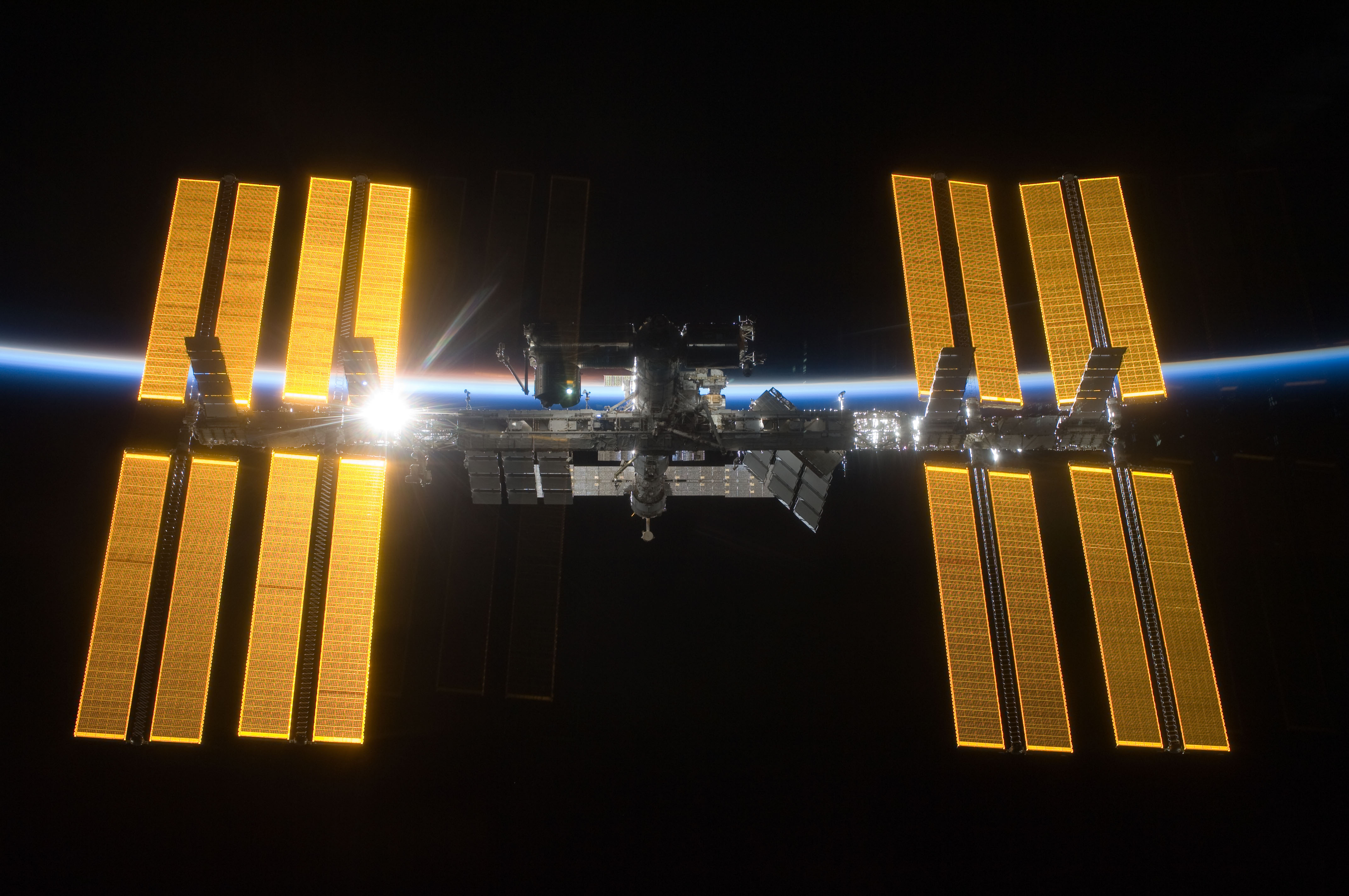
The International Space Station in front of the Earth. This image was taken by Space Shuttle Discovery while pulling away during STS-119.

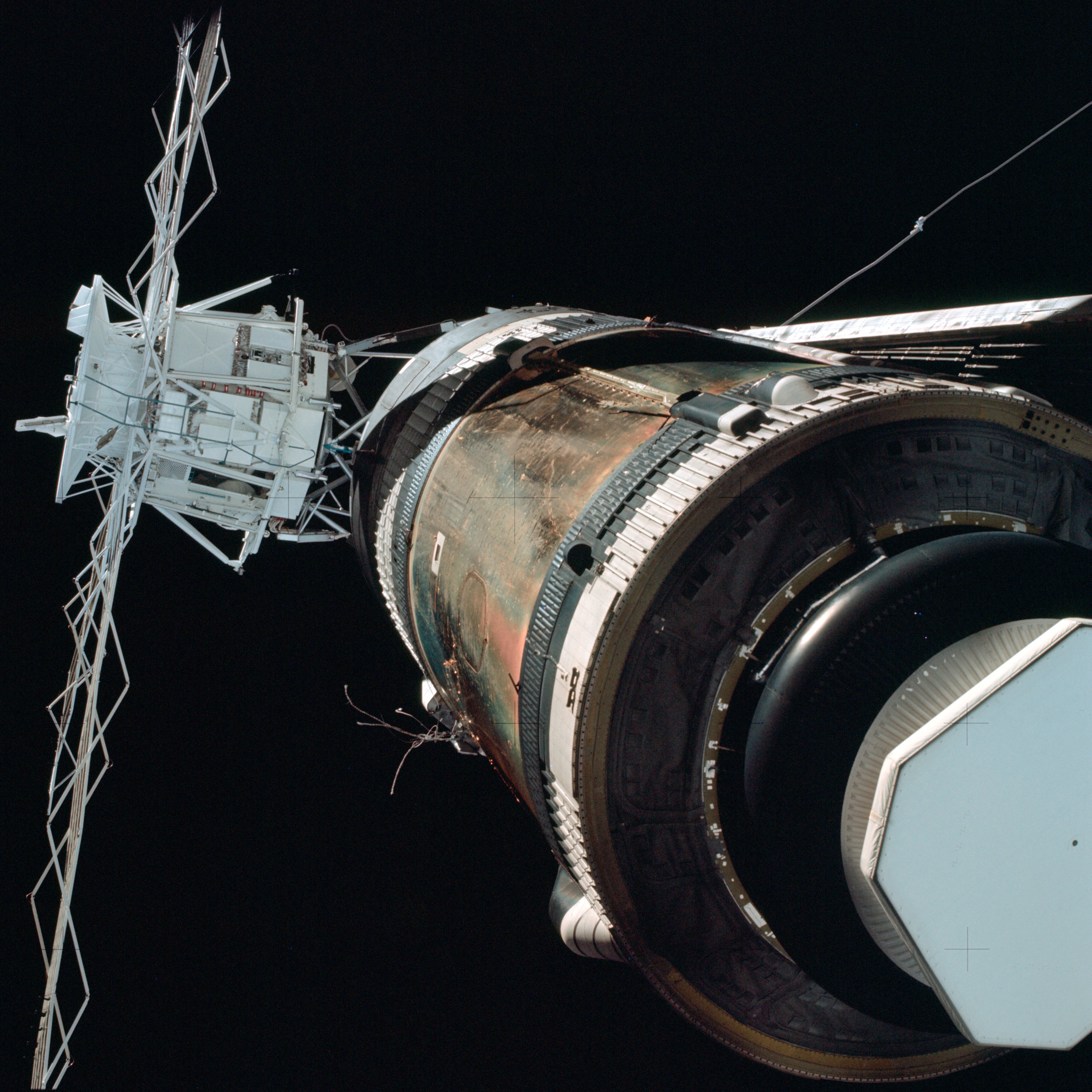
Skylab viewed from the command module of Skylab 2

A space station (or orbital station) is a spacecraft which remains in orbit and hosts humans for extended periods of time. It is therefore an artificial satellite featuring habitation facilities. The purpose of maintaining a space station varies depending on the program. Most often space stations have been research stations, but they have also served military or commercial uses, such as hosting space tourists.

Space stations have been hosting the only continuous presence of humans in space. The first space station was Salyut 1 (1971), which hosted the first crew of the ill-fated Soyuz 11. Consecutively space stations have been operated since Skylab (1973) and occupied since 1987 with the Salyut successor Mir. Uninterrupted human presence in orbital space through space stations has been sustained since the operational transition from the Mir to the International Space Station (ISS), with the latter's first occupation in 2000.

There are currently two fully operational space stations – the ISS, occupied since Expedition 1 in October 2000, and China's Tiangong Space Station (TSS), occupied since the Shenzhou 14 mission in June 2022. The highest number of people at the same time on one space station has been 13, first achieved with the eleven day docking to the ISS of the 127th Space Shuttle mission in 2009. The record for most people on all space stations at the same time has been 17, first reached on May 30, 2023, with 11 people on the ISS and 6 on the TSS.

Space stations are often modular, featuring docking ports, through which they are built and maintained. Docking ports allow for the joining or movement of modules and the docking of other spacecraft for the exchange of people, supplies and tools. While space stations generally do not leave their orbit, they do feature thrusters for station keeping.

== Operational stations ==
As of 2026, two stations are orbiting Earth with life support system in place and fully operational.

Name	Entity	Crew size	Launched	Days in orbit (Note: Correct as of 11 November 2026)	Days occupied	Total crew and visitors	Crewed visits	Robotic visits	Mass	Pressurized volume	Habitable volume
International Space Station	(United States) NASA; (Russia) Roscosmos; ESA; (Canada) CSA; (Japan) JAXA	7	20 November 1998 (Note: Launch date of the initial module. Additional modules for this station were launched later.)	10218	9507	230	88	94	450,000 kg (990,000 lb)	1,005 m^{3} (35,500 ft^{3})	388 m^{3} (13,700 ft^{3})
Tiangong space station	(China) CMSA	3–6	29 April 2021	2022	1892	33	11	10	100,000 kg (220,000 lb)	340 m^{3} (12,000 ft^{3})	122 m^{3} (4,310 ft^{3})

== Past stations ==
These stations have re-entered the atmosphere and disintegrated. The Soviet Union ran two programs simultaneously in the 1970s, both of which were called Salyut publicly. The Long Duration Orbital Station (DOS) program was intended for scientific research into spaceflight whilst the Almaz program was a secret military program that tested space reconnaissance.

^{‡} = Never crewed

Name	Program Entity	Crew size	Launched	Reentered	Days in orbit	Days occu- pied	Total crew and visitors	Number of crewed visits	Number of robotic visits	Mass (* = at launch)	Pressurized volume
Salyut 1	DOS	3	19 April 1971	11 October 1971	175	24	6	2	0	18,425 kg (40,620 lb)	100 m^{3} (3,500 ft^{3})
Salyut 1	(Soviet Union) MOM	3	19 April 1971	11 October 1971	175	24	6	2	0	18,425 kg (40,620 lb)	100 m^{3} (3,500 ft^{3})
DOS-2^{‡}	DOS	— (Note: The USSR intended to crew these stations with two men, however they re-entered the atmosphere before the cosmonauts were launched.)	29 July 1972	29 July 1972	failed to reach orbit	—	—	—	—	18,000 kg (40,000 lb)	—
DOS-2^{‡}	(Soviet Union) RVSN	—	29 July 1972	29 July 1972	failed to reach orbit	—	—	—	—	18,000 kg (40,000 lb)	—
Salyut 2^{‡}	Almaz	—	3 April 1973	16 April 1973	13	—	—	—	—	18,500 kg (40,800 lb)	—
Salyut 2^{‡}	(Soviet Union) MOM	—	3 April 1973	16 April 1973	13	—	—	—	—	18,500 kg (40,800 lb)	—
Kosmos 557^{‡}	DOS	—	11 May 1973	22 May 1973	11	—	—	—	—	19,400 kg (42,800 lb)	—
Kosmos 557^{‡}	(Soviet Union) MOM	—	11 May 1973	22 May 1973	11	—	—	—	—	19,400 kg (42,800 lb)	—
Skylab	Skylab	3	14 May 1973	11 July 1979	2249	171	9	3	0	77,088 kg (169,950 lb)	360 m^{3} (12,700 ft^{3})
Skylab	(United States) NASA	3	14 May 1973	11 July 1979	2249	171	9	3	0	77,088 kg (169,950 lb)	360 m^{3} (12,700 ft^{3})
Salyut 3	Almaz	2	25 June 1974	24 January 1975	213	15	2	1	0	18,900 kg (41,700 lb)*	90 m^{3} (3,200 ft^{3})
Salyut 3	(Soviet Union) MOM	2	25 June 1974	24 January 1975	213	15	2	1	0	18,900 kg (41,700 lb)*	90 m^{3} (3,200 ft^{3})
Salyut 4	DOS	2	26 December 1974	3 February 1977	770	92	4	2	1	18,900 kg (41,700 lb)*	90 m^{3} (3,200 ft^{3})
Salyut 4	(Soviet Union) MOM	2	26 December 1974	3 February 1977	770	92	4	2	1	18,900 kg (41,700 lb)*	90 m^{3} (3,200 ft^{3})
Salyut 5	Almaz	2	22 June 1976	8 August 1977	412	67	4	3	0	19,000 kg (42,000 lb)*	100 m^{3} (3,500 ft^{3})
Salyut 5	(Soviet Union) MOM	2	22 June 1976	8 August 1977	412	67	4	3	0	19,000 kg (42,000 lb)*	100 m^{3} (3,500 ft^{3})
Salyut 6	DOS	2	29 September 1977	29 July 1982	1764	683	33	16	14	19,000 kg (42,000 lb)	90 m^{3} (3,200 ft^{3})
Salyut 6	(Soviet Union) MOM	2	29 September 1977	29 July 1982	1764	683	33	16	14	19,000 kg (42,000 lb)	90 m^{3} (3,200 ft^{3})
Salyut 7	DOS	3	19 April 1982	7 February 1991	3216	861	22	10	15	19,000 kg (42,000 lb)	90 m^{3} (3,200 ft^{3})
Salyut 7	(Soviet Union) MOM	3	19 April 1982	7 February 1991	3216	861	22	10	15	19,000 kg (42,000 lb)	90 m^{3} (3,200 ft^{3})
Mir	DOS	3	19 February 1986	23 March 2001	5511	4594	125	39	68	129,700 kg (285,900 lb)	350 m^{3} (12,400 ft^{3})
Mir	(Soviet Union) MOM; (Russia) Roscosmos	3	19 February 1986	23 March 2001	5511	4594	125	39	68	129,700 kg (285,900 lb)	350 m^{3} (12,400 ft^{3})
Tiangong-1	Tiangong	3	29 September 2011	2 April 2018	2377	22	6	2	1	8,506 kg (18,753 lb)	15 m^{3} (530 ft^{3})
Tiangong-1	(China) CMSA	3	29 September 2011	2 April 2018	2377	22	6	2	1	8,506 kg (18,753 lb)	15 m^{3} (530 ft^{3})
Tiangong-2	Tiangong	2	15 September 2016	19 July 2019	1037	29	2	1	1	8,506 kg (18,753 lb)	15 m^{3} (530 ft^{3})
Tiangong-2	(China) CMSA	2	15 September 2016	19 July 2019	1037	29	2	1	1	8,506 kg (18,753 lb)	15 m^{3} (530 ft^{3})

== Prototypes ==
These stations are prototypes; they only exist as testing platforms and were never intended to be crewed. OPS 0855 was part of a cancelled Manned Orbiting Laboratory project by the United States, while the Genesis stations were launched privately. The Genesis stations were "retired" when their avionics systems stopped working after two and a half years, yet they remained in orbit as derelict spacecraft as their orbits gradually degraded over the next 18 years. Both Genesis stations re-entered the atmosphere and were destroyed two months apart in mid-2025.

Name	Entity	Program	Launched	Reentered	Days in orbit	Mass	Pressurized volume
OPS 0855	(United States) USAF	MOL	3 November 1966	9 January 1967	67	9,680 kg (21,340 lb)	11.3 m^{3} (400 ft^{3})
Genesis I	(United States) Bigelow Aerospace		12 July 2006	2 July 2025	7427	1,360 kg (3,000 lb)	11.5 m^{3} (410 ft^{3})
Genesis II	(United States) Bigelow Aerospace		28 June 2007	2 September 2025	7076	1,360 kg (3,000 lb)	11.5 m^{3} (406 ft^{3})

== Concepts ==
Name	Entity	Crew Size	Pressurized Volume	Ref
Station in a Box	(United States) Above	TBD	TBD	
Pioneer Station	(United States) Above	28	TBD	
Voyager Station	(United States) Above	400	TBD	
VERA Station	(United States) Gateway Spaceport LLC	200	369,523 m^{3}	
Gateway Spaceport	(United States) Gateway Spaceport LLC	TBD	11,906,250 m^{3}	
Mars Base Camp	(United States) Lockheed Martin	TBD	TBD	

== Planned and proposed ==
These space stations have been announced by their host entity and are currently in planning, development or production. The launch date listed here may change as more information becomes available.

Name	Entity	Program	Crew size	Launch date	Planned Pressurized Volume	Remarks
LIFE Pathfinder	(United States) Sierra Space	Private	TBD	2026	285 m^{3}	"Before offering LIFE for Orbital Reef, though, the company is proposing to launch a standalone “pathfinder” version of LIFE as soon as the end of 2026".
StarMax	(United States) Gravitics	Private	TBD	2026	400 m^{3} (14,000 cu ft)	"The StarMax module provides up to 400 cubic meters of usable habitable volume - nearly half the volume of the International Space Station in one module."
Haven-1	(United States) Vast	Private	4	Q1 2027	80 m^{3}	"Scheduled to be the world's first commercial space station, Haven-1 and subsequent human spaceflight missions will accelerate access to space exploration"
Axiom Station	(United States) Axiom Space	Private	TBD	2027		Private, free flying space station for commercial tourism and science activities.
Orbital Reef	(United States) Blue Origin (United States) Sierra Space	Private	10	2027	830 m^{3} (29,000 cu ft)	"Commercial station in LEO for research, industrial, international, and commercial customers."
Russian Orbital Service Station	(Russia) Roscosmos	Russia's next generation space station.	TBD	2027		With Russia leaving the ISS programme sometime after 2024, Roscosmos announced this new space station in April 2021 as the replacement for that program.
Bharatiya Antariksha Station	(India) ISRO	Indian Human Spaceflight Programme	3	TBD	~ 265 m^{3} (9,400 cu ft)	ISRO chairman K. Sivan announced in 2019 that India will not join the International Space Station, but will instead build a space station of its own. of 52 Tonne Mass It is intended to be completed 5–7 years after the conclusion of the Gaganyaan program.
Starlab	(United States) NanoRacks (United States) Voyager Space (European Union) Airbus (Canada) MDA Space (Japan) Mitsubishi Corporation	Private	4	2028	~450 m^{3} (16,000 cu ft)	"Commercial platform supporting a business designed to enable science, research, and manufacturing for customers around the world." While originally Lockheed Martin was included in the project, as of 2024, it appears their primary role has been filled by Airbus, to provide the main habitat for the station. As of 2024, they are no longer listed as a partner on Starlab's website.
Haven-2	(United States) Vast	Private	12	2028	1160 m^{3}	A planned successor to Haven-1. Vast CEO Max Hoat expressed hope that the first module of Haven-2 will be launched in 2028 if the station is approved during the second phase of NASA's Commercial LEO Destinations program.
Thunderbird Station	(United States) Max Space	Private	4	2029	350 m^{3}	
Artificial Gravity Station	(United States) Vast	Private	40	2035	2160 m^{3}	
Japanese Space Station Module (Mitsui)	(Japan) JAXA|Mitsui & Co.	TBA	TBD	TBD		Japan's spaceflight agency, JAXA, announced in July 2024 that has contracted Mitsui & Co. to develop a concept for a new space station module for eventual flight and docking to an American private space station as yet to be determined as of the initial announcement.

== Cancelled projects ==
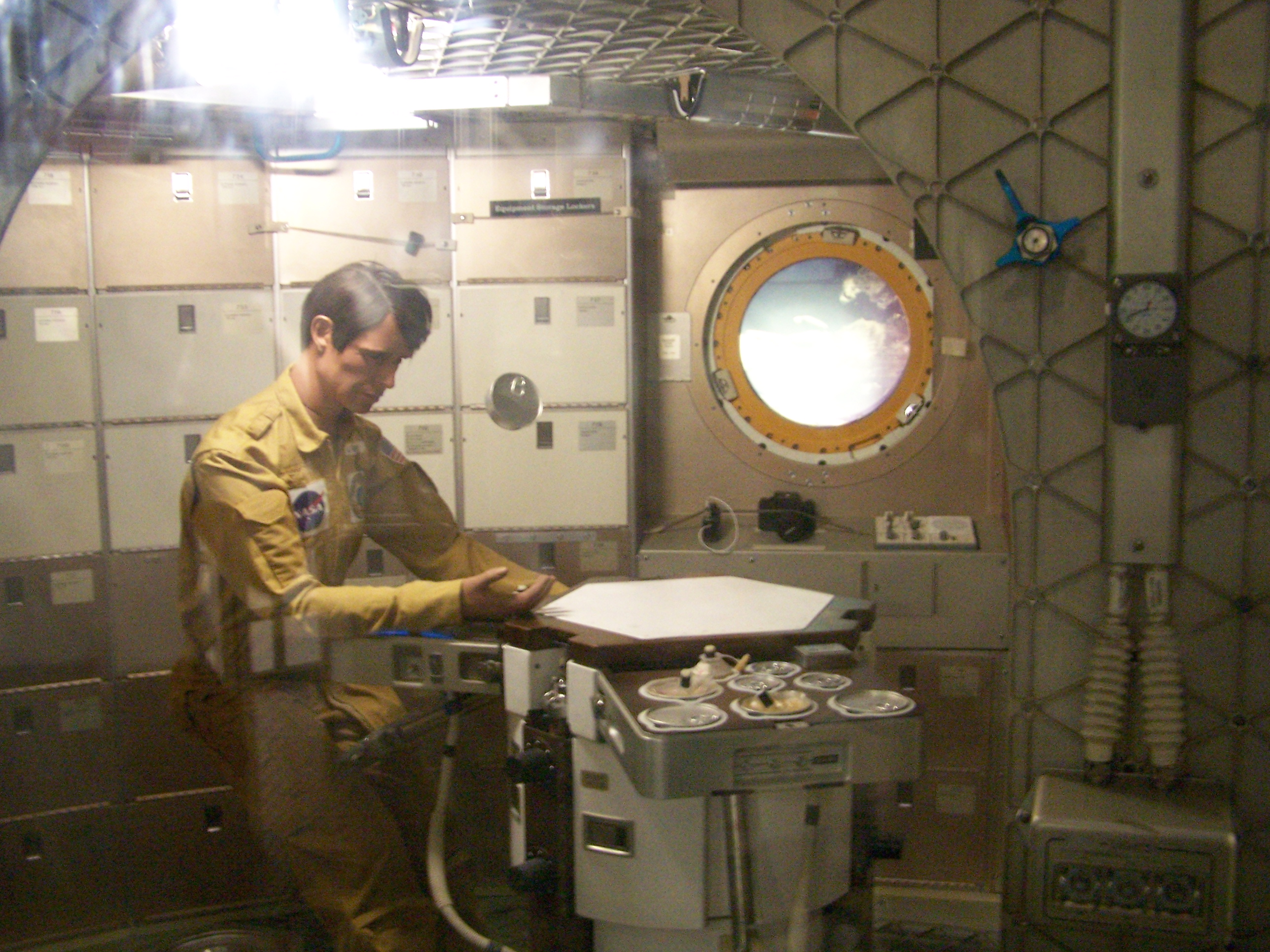
The interior of Skylab B, on display at the Smithsonian's National Air and Space Museum

Most of these stations were cancelled due to financial difficulties, or merged into other projects.

Name	Entity	Crew	Cancellation	Remarks
Manned Orbiting Laboratory 1–7	(United States) USAF	2	1969	Boilerplate mission launched successfully, wider project cancelled due to excessive costs
Skylab B	(United States) NASA	3	1976	Constructed, but launch cancelled due to lack of funding. Now a museum piece.
OPS-4	(Soviet Union) USSR	3	1979	Constructed, but Almaz program cancelled in favour of uncrewed recon satellites.
Freedom	(United States) NASA	14–16	1993	Merged to form the basis of the International Space Station.
Mir-2	(Soviet Union) USSR (Russia) Roscosmos	2	1993	Merged to form the basis of the International Space Station.
Columbus MTFF	ESA	3	1993	Merged to form the basis of the International Space Station.
Galaxy	(United States) Bigelow Aerospace	Robotic	2007	Cancelled due to rising costs and ability to ground test key Galaxy subsystems
Sundancer	(United States) Bigelow Aerospace	3	2011	Was under construction, but cancelled in favour of developing B330.
Lunar Orbital Station	(Russia) Roscosmos	5	2007	Cancelled after feasibility reports.
Almaz commercial	(United Kingdom) Excalibur Almaz	4+	2016	Soviet hardware was acquired, but never launched due to lack of funds.
Tiangong-3	(China) CNSA	3	2017	The goals for Tiangong-2 and 3 were merged, and were completed by a single station rather than two separate stations.
OPSEK	(Russia) Roscosmos	2+	2017	Some modules such as Nauka were launched and attached to the ISS- but proposals to split these off as a separate station were cancelled, and they instead remain part of the ISS.
B330	(United States) Bigelow Aerospace	3	2020	Test articles were constructed but not flight ready hardware; cancelled due to the COVID-19 pandemic.
Northrop Grumman CLD	(United States) Northrop Grumman	4-8	2023	Developed under the Commercial LEO Destinations program, cancelled by Northrop Grumman to partner with Nanoracks on Starlab.
Lunar Gateway	(United States) NASA; ESA (Canada) CSA (Japan) JAXA	4	2026	Intended to serve as a science platform and as a staging area for the lunar landings of NASA's Artemis program and follow-on human mission to Mars. Cancelled after a major revamp of the entire Artemis program in favour of building a Moon base by 2029–2036.

== Timeline ==
The image above contains clickable links

Timeline of space stations, sorted by the nations that launched them.

China
Soviet Union/Russia
USA
India
multiple nations

== Size comparison ==
The image above contains clickable links Size comparisons between current and past space stations as they appeared most recently. Solar panels in blue, heat radiators in red. Stations have different depths not shown by silhouettes.

== See also ==
- List of commercial space stations
- List of crewed spacecraft
- Space stations and habitats in fiction
- Spacelab
