= Space habitat (facility) =

Facility fulfilling habitational purposes

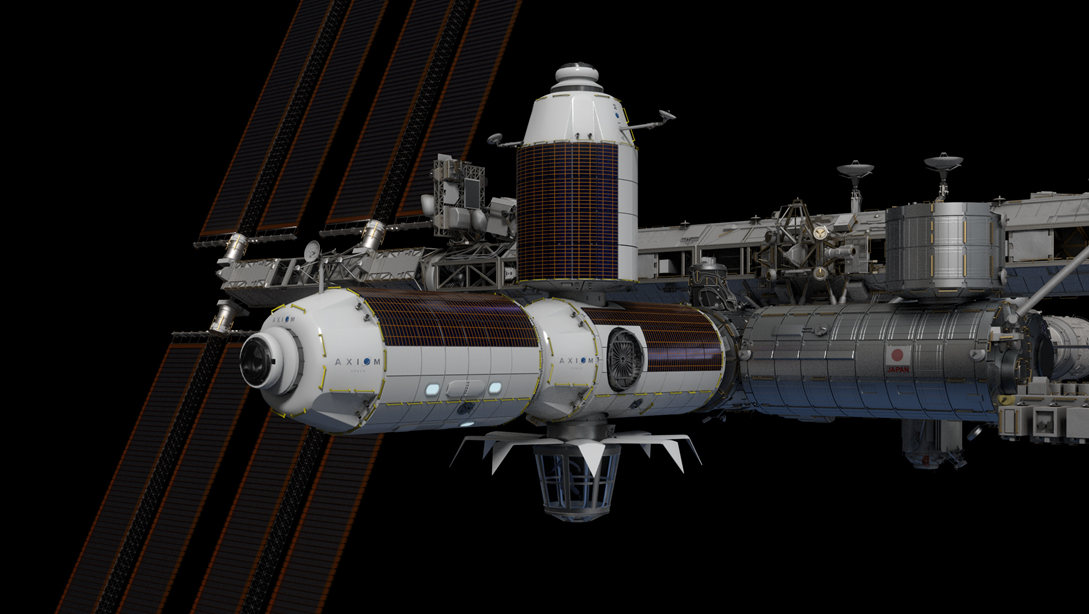
Artist's rendering of early plans for an Axiom Orbital Segment docked at the forward port of the ISS module Harmony

A space habitat (or habitation module) in a basic sense is any facility providing shelter and fulfilling habitational purposes in outer space. It is not to be confused with an extended space settlement, an arrangement of or infrastructure for multiple habitation facilities, in the sense of a space settlement. Space stations and theoretical extraterrestrial surface stations (or base station), such as a moonbase or Mars habitat, include or are basic space habitats.

The International Space Station was planned to get a now-canceled dedicated Habitation Module.

Space tourism is driving the development of dedicated habitats in space. Axiom Station will be a commercial space station with dedicated habitat modules for the purpose of tourism and commercial research.

In particular, inflatable space habitats have been in development for decades. Based on the earlier NASA TransHab design, inflatable habitats have been developed and tested in orbit by the now inactive company Bigelow Aerospace.

== Definition ==
The International Astronautical Federation has differentiated space habitats to space settlements and space infrastructure the following way:

- Habitat: pressurized volume(s) within which humans live and work, including relevant facilities for life support.
- Settlement: group of permanently inhabited habitats installed near each other, possibly interconnected.
- Infrastructure: set of constructed elements supporting habitats and/or settlements such as (and not limited to): power plant, water plant, greenhouse and waste management facilities, communication facilities, transportation facilities, EVAs, roads, spaceport, research platforms, and so on.

== Extraterrestrial surface habitat ==
The only extraterrestrial surface habitats that sofar have been erected were the temporary Apollo Lunar Modules, such as Eagle of Tranquility Base, the very first.

Eagle, the first ever surface habitat, at Tranquility Base on July 20, 1969

== See also ==
- Bioastronautics
- Controlled ecological life-support system
- Closed ecological system
- Earth systems engineering and management
- Human analog missions
- Human presence in space
- Life support system
- List of Mars analogs
- Mars analog habitat
- Mars habitability analogue environments on Earth
- Planetary surface construction
- Space architecture
- Space infrastructure
- Terrestrial analogue sites
- Underground construction
- Underwater habitat
