= DigitalBlast =

Japanese aerospace consulting firm

- Company type: Private
- Industry: business consultation
- Founded: December 2018 in Saitama, Saitama, Japan
- Founder: Shingo Horiguchi
- Fate: Active
- Headquarters: Chiyoda, Tokyo, Japan
- Products: centrifuges
- Website: digitalblast.co.jp

DigitalBlast is a Japanese aerospace consulting firm focusing on the space industry in general. It provides guidance to firms seeking to enter the space sector, along with providing support for digital transformation. The company also manages SPACE Media, a news website focusing on private spaceflight.

In September 2024, DigitalBlast and Oscar Promotion jointly announced the debut of Artemis Ichi, a VTuber for promoting the space economy.

== Project NOAH ==
Project NOAH is a research and development project of DigitalBlast which aims to develop technologies that will realize a self-sustaining environment on the Moon, in anticipation of human habitats being built there in the near future. One goal of the project is to study the effects low-gravity has on plant production. The AMAZ research equipment will be the first step of this project.

=== AMAZ ===
AMAZ is a research equipment under development by DigitalBlast that will use centrifugal forces to create artificial gravity equivalent to the lunar surface. AMAZ will be sent to the International Space Station (ISS) and will be used to conduct research on plant growth. Experiments to be conducted by AMAZ include a study on the growth of moss in different gravity environments by Toyama University, and cultivating brewer's yeast in the gravity environment of the Moon and Mars in cooperation with the University of Tokyo and Nara Institute of Science and Technology.

In November 2022, DigitalBlast signed a contract with Axiom Space for placing AMAZ inside the ISS National Lab. Axiom Space will support AMAZ's safety review, along with providing a transport service to orbit and its retrieval. The agreement also left open the possibility of the AMAZ device later being placed inside the Axiom Orbital Segment, a privately operated space station that will be docked to the ISS. The same month, it was announced that Mitsubishi Heavy Industries was contracted to design AMAZ's flight model.

In February 2023, DigitalBlast announced plans for a modified version of AMAZ dubbed 'AMAZ Alpha', which will be used for cell culturing.

=== TAMAKI ===
TAMAKI is a research equipment that will be capable of supplying water to grow plants inside. TAMAKI will be carried inside an uncrewed science satellite complete with a retrieval space capsule being developed by ElevationSpace. As of August 2022, TAMAKI was planned to be launched in 2026.

== See also ==
- Private spaceflight
