= Starlab (space station) =

Planned commercial space station

- Starlab logo

Station statistics
- Launch: 2029 (planned)
- Carrier rocket: Starship Cargo
- Length: ≥8 m (26 ft)
- Width: 8 m (26 ft)

Starlab is a low Earth orbit (LEO) commercial space station currently under development by Starlab Space, a joint venture between the U.S. company Voyager Technologies (formerly Voyager Space and majority shareholder in Nanoracks) and European company Airbus. If development continues beyond the initially funded phase in 2021–24, then Starlab would be launched before the decommissioning of the ISS, no earlier than 2029. The development program has received partial funding from both NASA and the ESA. The station will serve as a weightlessness research laboratory, particularly for the pharmaceutical industry, and will be open to American and European astronauts, but will not be open to space tourism.

== History ==
=== Background ===
In 2021, NASA presented the Commercial LEO Destinations (CLD) program which aims to support the creation of private Earth-orbiting space stations in which the agency would only be one of the customers (tenant or other form of contract), with companies retaining ownership of their stations. This is a new outsourcing of the agency's space program, following on from the Commercial Orbital Transportation Services/Commercial Resupply Services (cargo transport) and Commercial Crew Development/Commercial Crew Program (crew transport) programs. These stations will have to take over from the International Space Station after its deorbiting, planned for the early 2030s. For its part, NASA is focusing on its lunar exploration with Artemis program.

The Starlab project was initially proposed in October 2021 by Nanoracks, its majority shareholder Voyager Technologies (formerly Voyager Space), and Lockheed Martin to respond to the Commercial LEO Destinations program (CLD) of the American space agency, NASA. The team of companies developing Starlab was one of three teams selected in December 2021 to continue their work with grants from NASA, i.e. $160 million, the two other competing teams, Blue Origin (associated with Sierra Space (carve-out from Sierra Nevada Corporation), Boeing and Redwire) and Northrop Grumman (associated with Dynetics) were granted $130 million and $125.6 million, respectively, subject to the approval by the United States Congress. These Space Act Agreements are the first phase of two by which NASA aims to maintain an uninterrupted U.S. presence in low-Earth orbit by transitioning from the International Space Station to other platforms. Initially, the proposed station design consisted of a docking node module surrounded by a large inflatable module (technology originally developed in the 1990s by NASA, during the Transhab project, and later extended by Bigelow Aerospace) to be built by Lockheed Martin and by a service module, providing energy (solar panels) and propulsion.

=== Development ===
The interior design of the station, in particular the astronauts' living spaces, was assigned to the hospitality company Hilton Worldwide in September 2022.

At the beginning of January 2023, it was announced that Airbus Defence and Space was joining the project, which would facilitate the expansion of the station's customer base to Europeans, notably members of the European Space Agency. “Working with Airbus we will expand Starlab’s ecosystem to serve the European Space Agency (ESA) and its member state space agencies to continue their microgravity research in LEO,” Dylan Taylor, chairman and chief executive of Voyager Space, said in the announcement. The company must provide its “technical design support and expertise” and it is later revealed that the inflatable module, developed by Lockheed Martin, is abandoned and replaced by a rigid metallic module on which the skills of the European group will be called upon. Indeed, the technology of inflatable modules is considered insufficiently mature and safe, compared to that of rigid metallic modules, for use on a main crewed module.

On 2 August 2023, the partnership between the companies was modified to become a formal joint venture between Airbus Defense and Space and Voyager Space, which will be responsible for the construction and operation of the station. Lockheed Martin is no longer mentioned, its role having been taken over by Airbus.

In June 2023, the project passed a Systems Requirements Review (SRR) examination conducted with NASA assessing technical maturity and “functional, technical, performance, and security requirements”.

On 4 October 2023, Northrop Grumman announced that it was joining the Starlab project and abandoning its own station project. The company plans in particular to develop an autonomous docking system for its Cygnus spacecraft, which will resupply the station.

On 9 January 2024, Voyager Space and Airbus finalized their agreement to form Starlab Space LLC, their joint venture to design and build Starlab. On 31 January, Starlab Space selected Starship as their launch vehicle for the space station.

In April 2024, it was reported the design stage of the project was proceeding on track with launch still estimated in 2028. In February 2026, the project was announced to have completed its Commercial Critical Design Review (CCDR) with NASA.

== Design ==
The Starlab space station design as of 2023 consists of two modules: a service module providing propulsion and energy with solar panels and a module serving as habitat and laboratory and having docking ports, with module diameter of 8 m (26 ft) (compared to approximately 4 m for the ISS modules), and a pressurized volume of 450 m^{3} (16,000 cu ft). The pressurized volume of the ISS in its fully built long-term configuration is ~900 m^{3}. Starlab also features a 60 kW power and propulsion element, with a large robotic arm for servicing cargo and external payloads

The dual-module station is intended to be launched in a single launch, no earlier than 2029, on SpaceX's Starship launch vehicle, for reasons of size and mass. Starship is currently the only launch vehicle capable of launching 8-m diameter payloads. The station will be able to conduct more than 400 experiments per year, roughly the same as the ISS, as well as support up to four astronauts.

== See also ==
- Aurora Space Station – Design concept for a commercial space station
- BA 2100 – Space habitat conceptualized by Bigelow Aerospace
- B330 – Space habitat designed by Bigelow Aerospace
- Bigelow Expandable Activity Module – Experimental inflatable module – Installed on ISS
- Axiom Station – Planned private space station
- Japanese Space Station Module (Mitsui)
- Orbital Reef – Proposed low Earth orbit space station
- Haven-1 – Planned space station
