= List of commercial space stations =

While commercial space flights have been flown to the International Space Station (ISS), there are currently no commercial space stations in operation. This is a list of planned and cancelled commercial space stations.

== Planned ==
NASA's Commercial LEO Destinations program (CLD) program was established in 2021 to fund future commercial space stations to replace the ISS. As of November 2026, of the 11 original applicants and 3 finalists, only the Starlab Space Station is still in active development.

=== Axiom Station ===
Axiom Station is a planned modular space station designed by Axiom Space for commercial space activities and space tourism uses. Axiom Space gained initial NASA approval for the venture in January 2020. It is unsure what launch vehicles will be used to launch these modules.

At least five modules are expected to be launched to assemble the station. The first module, the Payload Power Thermal Module (PPTM), is planned to be launched no earlier than 2027 and dock with one of two ISS ports currently used by cargo spacecraft. After the launch of the second module, Habitat One (Hab-1), PPTM will undock from the ISS and join with Hab-1 to form the core Axiom Station.

Canadarm2 may continue its operations on Axiom Station after the retirement of the ISS in 2030.

=== Starlab ===
Starlab is the name given to the planned LEO space station designed by Nanoracks for commercial space activities uses. The station is expected to be launched in 2028.

The company released preliminary plans in October 2021, where the main structure of Starlab consisted of a large inflatable habitat to be built by Lockheed Martin and a metallic docking node. In 2023, the design changed to a metallic structure with Airbus Space as the main partner.

The station is being designed to support 4 persons in 340 m^{3} of volume. The station also features a 60 kW power and propulsion element, a large robotic arm for servicing cargo and external payloads. The company has partnered with other companies to realise the project:

- Nanoracks: Nanoracks owns and operates Starlab and GWC Science Park.
- Voyager Space: Voyager, the majority stakeholder in Nanoracks;
- Airbus: Airbus builds spacecraft systems. The company serves as the technical integrator for Starlab and will develop Starlab's habitat module. After launch, Airbus will operate the system under Nanoracks' leadership.

=== Haven-1 ===
In May 2023, Vast announced that they had purchased a SpaceX Falcon 9 launch for Haven-1, a small space station that will be a testbed for Haven-2. Originally targeted for launch as early as August 2025, the station is now scheduled to launch in Q1 2027.

=== Haven-2 ===
In October 2024, Vast announced Haven-2, a planned successor to Haven-1. It's intended to be much larger than Haven-1, with modular assembly and the intention of replacing the International Space Station. The first module of Haven-2 is expected to be launched by SpaceX Falcon Heavy in 2028, if the station is approved during the second phase of NASA's Commercial LEO Destinations program in 2026.

=== Thunderbird Station ===
On December 17th, 2025, Max Space announced that due to NASA's revisions of the Commercial LEO Destinations program, they were proposing a single launch space station based around their inflatable habitat technology. The station would expand to a volume of 350 cubic meters once in orbit. The station as proposed would be designed to support four people as well as allowing for continuous habitation utilizing a pair of docking ports, allowing for resupply, crew rotation, and other visiting vehicles.

== Canceled ==
=== Bigelow Aerospace space station ===
Bigelow Aerospace proposed an expandable space station for commercial use. Air would have been pumped into the station to inflate each piece once they arrived on orbit. Bigelow ceased operations in 2020.

=== Northrop Grumman "Free Flyer" ===
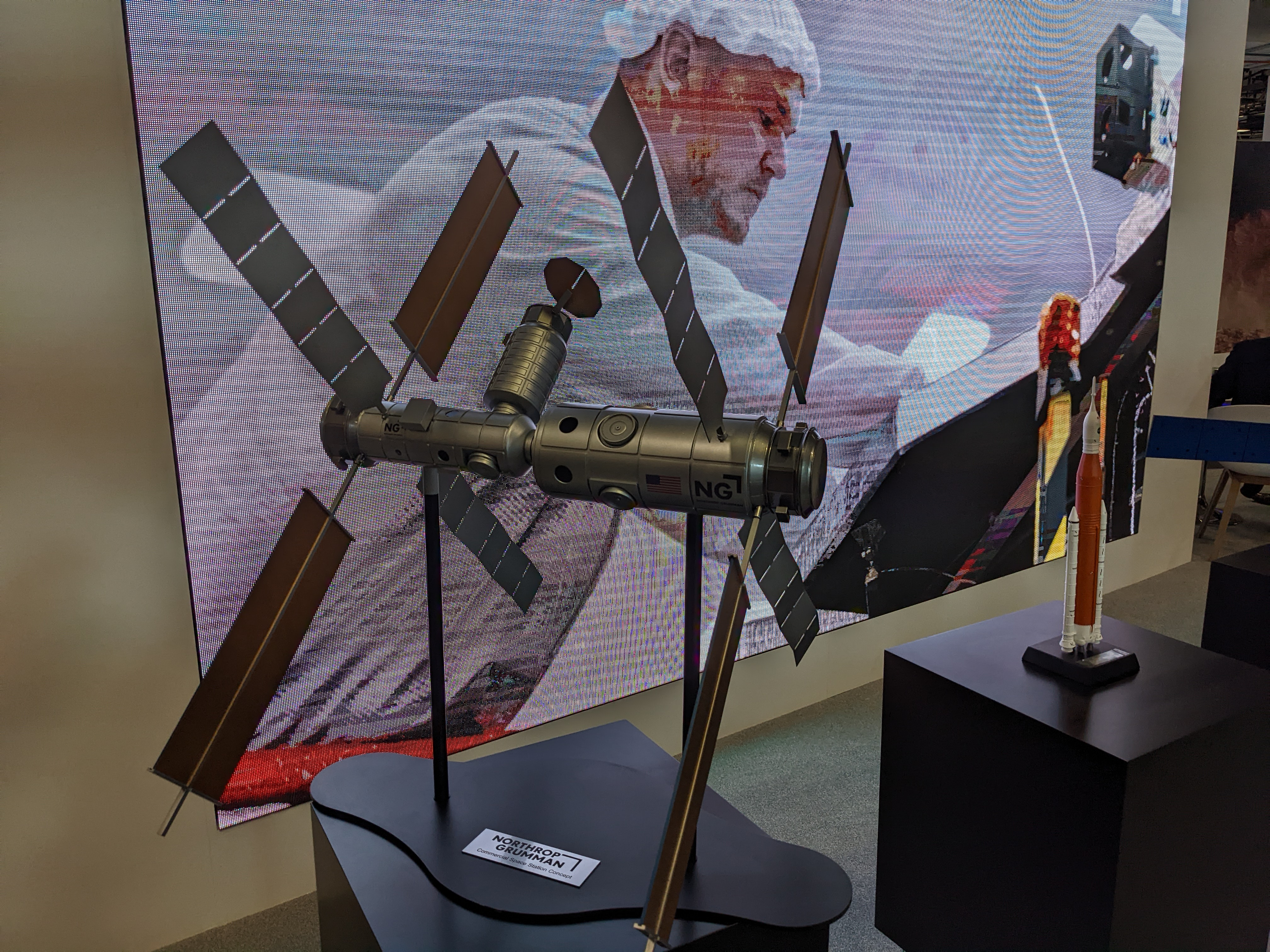
Northrop Grumman Commercial Space Station concept, featured at IAC 2022.

In December 2021, Northrop Grumman signed a Space Act Agreement with NASA under the Commercial Low-Earth Orbit Development program for $125.6 million to design a commercial free-flying space station in low Earth orbit (LEO). Northrop Grumman had a web page describing their "vision for space-as-a-service" which "focuses on delivering an accessible, full-service commercial space station in Low-Earth Orbit (LEO) that will continue the work of the International Space Station (ISS), while expanding across multiple markets to provide optimized and tailored support for a new commercial economy." Northrop Grumman was partnering with Rhodium Scientific on bio-tech and bio-pharma research in low-earth orbit.

In October 2023, Northrop-Grumman announced that they would abandon the concept and instead join forces on Voyager's Starlab space station.

=== Orbital Reef ===
On October 25, 2021, as its submission to NASA's Commercial LEO Destinations program, Blue Origin announced that together with Sierra Space it would build a 'Mixed-use space business park' in LEO called Orbital Reef, to 'open multiple new markets in space, [and] provide anyone with the opportunity to establish their own address on orbit. [..it] will offer research, industrial, international, and commercial customers the cost competitive end-to-end services they need including space transportation and logistics, space habitation, equipment accommodation, and operations including onboard crew. Further partners are Boeing, Redwire Space, Genesis Engineering Solutions, and Arizona State University. In November 2026, Blue Origin announced they would withdrew from the CLD program and focusing on lunar missions instead.

== See also ==
- Commercial astronaut
- Space tourism
- Human spaceflight
- LEO Cargo Return Service
