= OPS-4 (Almaz program) =

OPS-4 is an unflown Soviet space station, expected to be a fourth in the secret Almaz military program. It was initially planned for launch in late 1977, but delays in readiness of the TKS spacecraft caused this date to be shifted. By December 1978 cosmonauts were training for OPS-4 with an estimated launch date of December 1980, but the Almaz program was formally cancelled in February 1979.

== Spacecraft ==
OPS-4 underwent several technical and design changes. The aft docking port was designed to receive heavier TKS spacecraft, compared to a lighter Soyuz-enabled docking port in the three previous stations.

It was to be the first station launched with a three panel Mech-A Synthetic Aperture Radar and a crewed reusable Return Vehicle VA. The VA was replaced by a second docking port, due to delays in preparing a crew-rated TKS; the front section was refitted with a Soyuz-enabled docking port to receive crewed craft. It would have also carried a radar antennae for weather research. Planned sensors for enemy satellites and ballistic missiles were ultimately flown aboard Salyut 7.

OPS-4 was to carry an advanced Shchit-2 space-to-space cannon. It was reported to be a two projectile system armed with unguided missiles.
