= Large Integrated Flexible Environment =

Inflatable space habitat design

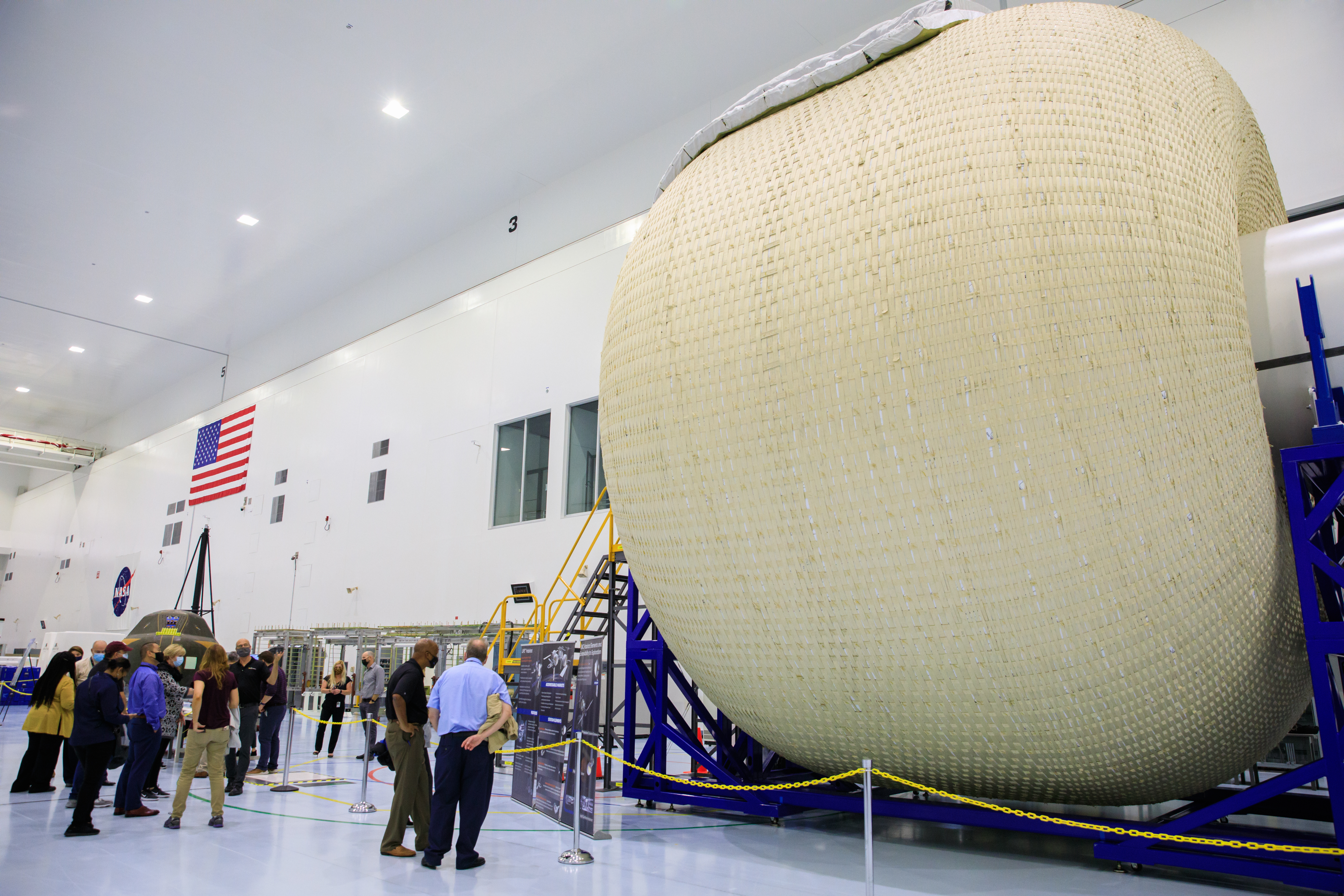
A prototype Large Integrated Flexible Environment habitat inside the Space Station Processing Facility high bay on April 19, 2021

The Large Integrated Flexible Environment (LIFE) is an inflatable space habitat design currently being developed by Sierra Space. The proposed Orbital Reef commercial space station would include multiple LIFE habitats.

== Development ==
In September 2022 Sierra Space completed a successful sub-scale Ultimate Burst Pressure test of a LIFE prototype. A second successful test was completed later that year, exceeding NASA certification requirements. On 22 January 2024 the company announced a successful full scale burst test, exceeding safety margins by 27%.

== Pathfinder ==
As soon as the end of 2026, before using LIFE as part of Orbital Reef, Sierra Space is proposing to launch a “pathfinder” version of LIFE as a standalone space station.

== See also ==
- List of space stations
