= Japanese Space Station Module (Mitsui) =

Commercial space module

The Japan Module, also known as the Kibō successor module, is a commercial space module for scientific research being studied by the Japanese space agency JAXA and private venture Japan LEO Shachu, a wholly owned subsidiary of conglomerate Mitsui & Co., that will be docked to a yet-to-be-identified American commercial space station. The module will be placed in low Earth orbit and will primarily be used for biological and material physics research.

== Overview ==
The Japan Module is a project seeking to develop a module that can be attached to a future commercial space station after the retirement of the International Space Station. As of July 2024, it is under study by Mitsui & Co. and its partners through Japan LEO Shachu, a subsidiary of Mitsui & Co. established on 1 July 2024. Private Japanese firms such as Mitsui are expected to negotiate with their US couterparts directly, while the Japanese government plays a secondary role by providing technical and financial support. According to Mitsui, partners in the project includes Astroscale, DigitalBlast, ElevationSpace, IHI Aerospace, JAMSS, Mitsubishi Electric, Mitsubishi Heavy Industries, Shiseido, Space Compass, and Tokio Marine Nichido. The module is expected to be resupplied by the uncrewed HTV-X cargo spacecraft, and will likely be served by a retrievable space capsule. ElevationSpace will study the feasibility of a frequent sample-return service using a modified version of the HTV-X. Space Compass will study the use of optical communication between Earth and the Kibō Module successor, as well as a data center in orbit for data processing at the module.

As of September 2023, the exact space station that the Japan Module will be docked has not been disclosed. Mitsui itself has in the past invested in Axiom Space and its commercial Axiom Station project, while one of the partner companies Mitsubishi Heavy Industries has been collaborating with Sierra Space's Orbital Reef space station.

== History ==
Japan has participated in the International Space Station (ISS) since its inception, and the Japanese Experiment Module Kibō has been a cornerstone in the country's human spaceflight program for decades. In anticipation of the ISS being operated until around 2031 when it will likely be de-orbited, in January 2020 JAXA began to research possible options of human space activities in low Earth orbit (LEO). From November 2021, discussions with other space agencies participating in the ISS were held regarding the technology that will be needed for a transition to a commercial space station.

By January 2022, JAXA concluded that in order to make a smooth transition from Kibō to a commercial space station, it was best to continue participating in the ISS program after 2025, instead of modifying the HTV-X into an uncrewed space laboratory, or JAXA procuring a Crew Dragon from SpaceX to use as a free-flyer. From 2025 to 2030, preparations for an ISS successor will be made, such as developing an experiment rack that can be placed in multiple locations, enabling their relocation from the Kibō Module to any commercial module docked to the ISS in the future. Then, during the 2030s a transition period to private-sector-led LEO activities will be set up, and by the 2040s it was envisioned that the private sector will be operating independently in LEO and that human activities in LEO will have grown into an established service sector. By then government entities will be one among the numerous users of LEO services.

A review of the ISS program concluded that Japan's participation in the ISS program had a higher cost performance when compared to other countries. From the Japanese government's perspective, continuing human spaceflight in LEO in the post-ISS era was identified to be vital to train human resources, for international space cooperation and diplomacy, and for testing new technologies.

JAXA then conducted a comparative analysis of potential scenarios, the results of which were reported in November 2022. The four studied scenarios was a permanent Japanese LEO station, a platform built by cooperation between Japan, US, and the commercial sector, acquisition of services from a private US space station, and finally a short-stay space station and utilization of uncrewed satellites. The second scenario was deemed to be the best choice, both in terms of cost performance and less restriction on activities, while the fourth scenario may be useful as an alternative.

On 14 September 2023, JAXA selected Mitsui to conduct a study of the module. A dedicated subsidiary, Japan LEO Shachu, was established by Mitsui on 1 July 2024 to develop the module concept and establish connections with interested commercial space station partners.

=== Mitsui's private space station concept ===
Mitsui's interest in a commercial ISS successor was first reported in March 2021. In November of the year, Mitsui announced that it will invest in Axiom Space. By 2022, the company had formulated a concept of a private research module in LEO.

In April 2023, ElevationSpace and JAXA announced that they will work with Mitsui and Mitsui Bussan Aerospace's Japan Module to pursue the implementation of a commercial sample-retrieval service. ElevationSpace and JAXA are jointly developing a frequent atmosphere re-entry and sample-retrieval service through the JAXA Space Innovation through Partnership and Co-creation (J-SPARC) program.

== See also ==
- Japanese space program
- Private spaceflight
- Japan–United States relations
