= Commercial LEO Destinations program =

NASA program

- CLD's program patch which was flown to the ISS on CRS-30
- Type of project: Aerospace
- Owner: NASA
- Country: United States
- Established: 2021; 5 years ago
- Status: Active
- Website: NASA Commercial Low Earth Orbit Destinations

The Commercial LEO Destinations program (CLD, or Commercial Destinations in Low Earth Orbit, or Commercial low Earth orbit (LEO) Development Program) is a public/private partnership program of NASA to help facilitate the building of private commercial space stations (CSSs) in low Earth orbit.

== Background ==
NASA must face the planned end of the International Space Station, whose deorbit is planned for the early 2030s. The agency therefore wants to have destinations in low Earth orbit ready to take over from the ISS. However, NASA no longer wishes to design, build and operate the stations but, rather, to be one of the customers who would use such a station if it were built and operated by private actors. NASA therefore proposed in 2021 to reuse the same formula used successfully for the delivery of cargo and crews to low orbit with the Commercial Orbital Transportation Services/Commercial Resupply Services (cargo transport) and Commercial Crew Development/Commercial Crew Program (transport crews).

NASA also began a program in 2014, NextSTEP Appendix I, which has the aim to add additional modules to the ISS. Axiom Space won a 2021 bid process and was awarded a contract $140 million to build, and then attach, its modules to the International Space Station. In December 2024, Axiom Space revised its station assembly plans to enable the autonomous operation of the Axiom Station after two launches, with only one module being attached to the ISS in 2027 before separating about one year later.

A previously projected part of the program, NextSTEP Appendix K, was to select standalone station projects but was canceled in August 2020.

== Setting up the program ==
In March 2021, NASA created the Commercial LEO Destinations program which aims to support the design, build and operation of private Earth-orbiting space stations in which the agency would be just one of the customers (tenant or other form of contract), with companies retaining ownership of their stations.

== Participants ==
Several companies indicated initial interest in the program during 2021, including Airbus, Blue Origin, Boeing, Collins Aerospace, Firefly Aerospace, General Dynamics, ispace, Lockheed Martin, Moog Inc., Nanoracks, Northrop Grumman, Raytheon, Redwire, RUAG Space, Sierra Nevada Corporation, SpaceX, Virgin Galactic, Virgin Orbit, Voyager Space Holdings, and York Space Systems.

The companies that actually applied in August 2021 were:

- Nanoracks
- Space Villages Inc.
- Northrop Grumman Systems Corporation
- Blue Origin
- Orbital Assembly Corporation (now Above: Space Development Corporation)
- Hamon Industries
- ThinkOrbital Inc.
- DEHAS Limited
- Maverick Space Systems Inc.
- SpaceX
- Relativity Space

== Team selection ==
Three teams were selected in December 2021 to continue work with agency grants (subject to approval by the United States Congress):

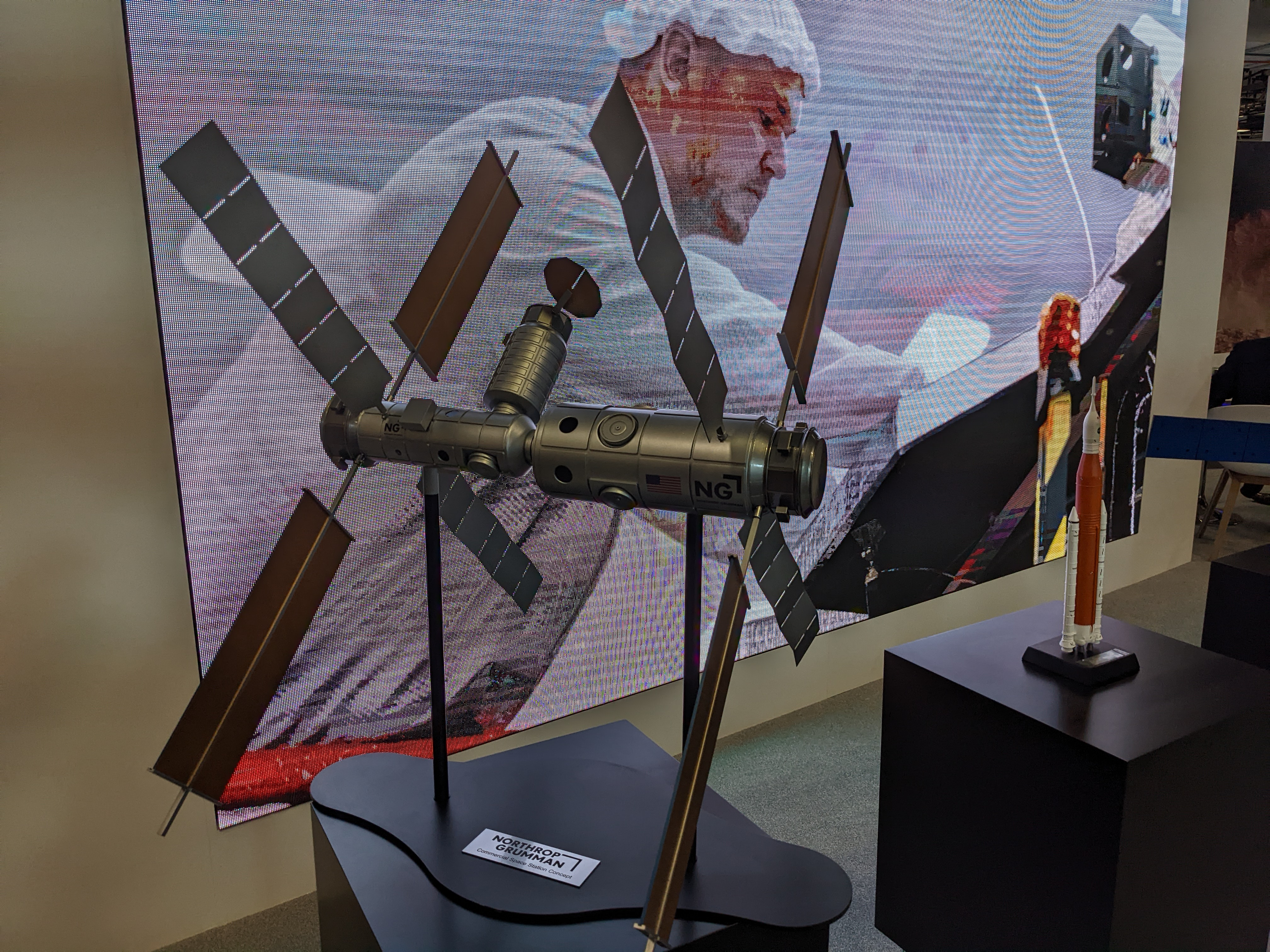
Northrop Grumman Commercial Space Station concept, featured at International Astronautical Congress (IAC) 2022.

- Nanoracks, associated with its majority shareholder Voyager Space and Lockheed Martin, was granted $160 million to develop its Starlab Space Station project.
- Northrop Grumman, associated with Dynetics, was granted $125.6 million to develop its Free Flyer station.
- Blue Origin, associated with Sierra Space (carve-out from Sierra Nevada Corporation), Boeing and Redwire, was granted $130 million to develop its Orbital Reef project. Blue Origin withdrew from the program in 2026.

Lockheed Martin withdrew from the Starlab project and was replaced by Airbus Defense and Space in 2023.

On October 4, 2023, Northrop Grumman announced that it was joining the Starlab project and abandoning its own station project. The company plans in particular to develop an autonomous docking system for its Cygnus cargo ship, which will resupply the station. The company had already received $36.6 million of the $125.6 million granted by NASA.

Also in October 2023, it was made public by CNBC that the partnership between Blue Origin and Sierra Space could end, with the two companies refocusing on their priority projects, respectively the Blue Moon and the Dream Chaser. The team had already received $24 million of the $130 million granted by NASA. In January 2024, an additional $100M in funding was added to the program.

In November 2026, Blue Origin announced it was withdrawing from the program.

== See also ==
- List of commercial space stations
