= Voyager Technologies =

American private space company

- Voyager Technologies' logo
- Type: Publicly traded company
- Industry: Space; Defense
- Founded: 2019 in New Castle, Delaware, U.S.
- Founder: Dylan Taylor
- Headquarters: Denver, Colorado, United States
- Key people: Dylan Taylor (Chairman, CEO); Matthew Kuta (President, COO)
- Subsidiaries: Altius Space Machines; Pioneer Astronautics; The Launch Company; Nanoracks; Valley Tech Systems; Space Micro; ZIN Technologies; Optical Physics Company; ElectroMagnetic Systems; LEOcloud; ExoTerra Resource; Estes Energetics; Astrobotic Technology
- Website: voyagertechnologies.com

Voyager Technologies (formerly Voyager Space Holdings) is a publicly traded American aerospace company headquartered in Denver, Colorado. It was founded in 2019 by investor Dylan Taylor as a holding company to provide financing to promising space startups that, since 2021, has also been developing a space station: Starlab. Starting in 2024 the company has undergone significant vertical integration to merge its various acquired companies under a unified Voyager name.

== History ==
Dylan Taylor founded Voyager in 2019 as an acquisition-oriented holding company intended to consolidate fragmented commercial space companies alongside former U.S. Air Force officer and fellow investor Matthew Kuta. The company was legally incorporated in Delaware on August 15, 2019, under the name Voyager Space Holdings.

In February 2024 Voyager announced that it would progressively retire its then seven subsidiary brands (Note: Altius, Pioneer, The Launch Company, NanoRacks, Valley Tech Systems, Space Micro, and ZIN) and integrate them under the single "Voyager Space" identity with the company legally changing its name to Voyager Technologies on January 16, 2025. On June 11, 2025, the company was publicly listed on the New York Stock Exchange under the ticker VOYG with an initial valuation of $3.8 billion primarily due to its increased presence in the missile defense market. On June 18, 2026, Voyager redomiciled from Delaware to Texas while retaining its principle offices in Denver.

=== Acquisitions ===
==== Altius Space Machines ====
On October 23, 2019, Voyager announced that it would be acquiring its first company, Altius Space Machines. Altius was founded in 2010 to develop rendezvous, capture, docking, robotic manipulation, satellite servicing and propellant-transfer hardware and is most known for its "DogTag" universal grapple fixture that would allow a servicing spacecraft to grab a failed satellite for repairs.

==== Pioneer Astronautics ====
On July 13, 2020, Voyager announced that they would be acquiring Pioneer Astronautics. Pioneer was founded in 1996 with a focus on sustainable human space exploration and in-situ resource utilization for both the moon and deep-space and had been contracted by NASA shortly before this acquisition to research materials systems for use under the Artemis program such as creating oxygen for breathable air out of lunar regolith.

==== The Launch Company ====
On November 19, 2020, Voyager announced that they would be acquiring The Launch Company an Anchorage based firm that is focused on “streamlining the launch process,” with the ultimate aim of building their own launch site and provided services for Firefly, Relativity Space and Virgin Orbit.

==== Nanoracks ====
On December 23, 2020, Voyager acquired a controlling stake in X.O. Markets, the parent company of Nanoracks which provides parts, including airlocks and experiment racks, for the ISS being involved in over 1,000 projects on the ISS including CubeSat deployment.

==== Valley Tech Systems ====
On October 4, 2021, Voyager announced that they had acquired the Folsom, California based Valley Tech Systems which developed solid-fueled propulsion for long-range missiles and geolocation technologies for the U.S. military. At the time of the acquisition Valley Tech held several ongoing contracts with the Missile Defense Agency, NASA, the U.S. Air Force, and the U.S. Army for reaction control systems, propulsion systems, and active thruster nozzles.

==== Space Micro ====
On November 23, 2021, Voyager announced that it would be buying a majority stake in Space Micro, a San Diego based satellite subsystem maker founded in 2002 that specialized in radiation-hardened radios, mission-data transmitters, image processing devices, and laser communications systems.

==== ZIN Technologies ====
On March 13, 2023, Voyager announced that it would be acquiring ZIN Technologies, an engineering, design and integration company providing human-related spaceflight systems and monitoring solutions specifically to help development on their Starlab station. With over 50 years of industry experience, ZIN provided hardware for the Space Shuttle, Mir, ISS, and Dream Chaser and had participated in over 400 research activities on the ISS.

==== LEOcloud ====
On April 4, 2025, Voyager purchased LEOcloud, an artificial intelligence and cloud computing company that sought to perform the data processing for satellites on the satellite themselves, allowing lower latency, reduced bandwidth requirements and faster data processing for satellite and defense applications.

==== Optical Physics Company ====
During Voyager's IPO filing it was revealed that they had acquired the Optical Physics Company (OPC) on May 2, 2025. OPC specialized in the manufacture of precision optical equipment, including star trackers, along with opto-mechanical assemblies, electronics and associated processing systems.

==== ElectroMagnetic Systems ====
On August 7, 2025, Voyager disclosed that they had acquired the software development firm ElectroMagnetic Systems (EMSI) that specializes in automatic target recognition tools for space-based radar systems. The acquisition was to bolster Voyager's ISR and Synthetic-aperture radar portfolio for defense industry partners.

==== ExoTerra Resource ====
On October 28, 2025, Voyager announced its acquisition of ExoTerra Resource, am electric propulsion systems manufacturer that almost exclusively worked for the Department of Defense and played a key part in the development of the Golden Dome initiative.

==== Estes Energetics ====
On November 20, 2025, Voyager announced it would be buying Estes Energetics, a Colorado based manufacturer of energetics, propulsion materials and chemical compounds. Estes' products are primarily purchased by the Department of Defense for 8-inch diameter solid rocket missiles.

==== Astrobotic ====
Their largest acquisition was their June 2, 2026, acquisition of Astrobotic Technology for $300 million USD. Astrobotic had been awarded two NASA contracts as part of the Commercial Lunar Payload Services program to land NASA payloads on the moon with their Peregrine and Griffin landers. Astrobotic had also been developing inflatable habitats, power systems, and dust-resistant coatings for the future Artemis Base Camp.

=== Starlab ===
On December 2, 2021, NASA signed a contract with Voyager, alongside Blue Origin, and Northrop Grumman to develop three commercial space stations, Starlab, Orbital Reef, and Free Flyer, to replace the ISS after it is decommissioned in 2030 as part of the Commercial LEO Destinations program. Voyager's station, Starlab, received the single largest contract, $160 million USD, and would be developed as a consortium between Voyager, their subsidiary Nanoracks, and Lockheed Martin. Initially Starlab consisted of a large inflated cabin with about 1/3rd the internal volume as the ISS with its own science lab, docking port, power and propulsion element, and robotic arm largely building off technology developed by Bigelow Aerospace's Expandable Activity Module.

On August 2, 2023, Airbus would join the Starlab consortium resulting in a total redesign of the proposed station. Airbus would effectively supersede Lockheed Martin who had been working on the inflatable main structure as Starlabs new main structure will be rigid and metallic and based off the Columbus module of the ISS. In October 2023 Northrop Grumman abandoned their Free Flyer station and also joined the Starlab consortium with their Cygnus to provide resupply missions. In 2024 Canada's MDA Space and Japan's Mitsubishi also joined the Starlab consortium offering a Canadarm-esque robotic arm and a cash infusion respectively.

Starlab completed its Preliminary Design Review in early 2025 with a prospective launch date of 2029.

== Spaceflights ==
=== VOYG-1 ===
On 16 April, 2026, Voyager was awarded a contract for the seventh Private Astronaut Mission to fly commercial astronauts to the International Space Station (ISS) on a SpaceX Dragon 2 under the name VOYG-1. The mission will spend at most 14 days at the ISS with all 4 of VOYG-1's crew being Voyager employed commercial astronauts to gain rendezvous and docking experience for future missions to Starlab. The mission is expected to launch no earlier than 2028. On January 31, 2024, Voyager announced that the SpaceX Starship had been selected for its launch vehicle with another NASA contract awarded for $217.5 million USD for further support.

== See also ==
- Vast (company)
- Axiom Space
