= Orbital Reef =

Proposed low Earth orbit space station

Station statistics
- Crew: Initially 6 (10+ in growth configuration)
- Launch: By 2027
- Carrier rocket: New Glenn; Vulcan Centaur
- Mission status: development
- Pressurized volume: 830 m^{3} (29,000 cu ft)

Orbital Reef was a low Earth orbit (LEO) space station under development. It is designed by Blue Origin and Sierra Space for commercial space activities and space tourism uses. Blue Origin has referred to it as a "mixed-use business park". The companies released preliminary concepts for the station on 25 October 2021. The station is being designed to support 10 persons in 830 m^{3} of volume. As of March 2022, the station was projected to be operational by 2027. In November of 2026, Blue Origin announced they were ending their participation in Orbital Reef to focus their resources on technologies and services supporting human presence and transportation services to the Moon.

== History ==
=== RFP and proposal ===
Blue Origin and Sierra Space partnered with several other companies and institutions to submit the 2021 proposal:

- Blue Origin: Partner, providing vehicle utility core systems, large-diameter modules, and the reusable heavy-lift New Glenn launch system.
  - Amazon: logistics and supply chain management.
  - Amazon Web Services: AWS will provide a variety of integrated cloud services and tools to support both near-term and long-term technical requirements including space station development and design, flight operations, data management, enterprise architecture, integrated networking, logistics, and communications capabilities.
- Sierra Space: Partner, providing Large Integrated Flexible Environment (LIFE) modules, node modules, and runway-landing Dream Chaser spaceplane for crew and cargo transportation.
  - Mitsubishi Heavy Industries.
- Boeing: Providing science modules, space station operations and maintenance, and the Starliner crew spacecraft.
- Redwire Space: Providing payload operations and deployable structures, and support for microgravity research, development, and manufacturing.
- Genesis Engineering Solutions: Providing the Single Person Spacecraft for routine external operations and tourist excursions.
- Arizona State University: Providing research advisory services and public outreach through a global consortium of fourteen leading universities.

=== NASA award and testing ===
On 2 December 2021, NASA announced it had selected Blue Origin as one of three companies to develop concept designs of space stations and other commercial destinations in space. Blue Origin was awarded $130 million.

The contract with Blue was one of three funded Space Act Agreements (SAA) that NASA issued for the first phase of its Commercial LEO Destinations program (CLD). Space Act Agreements provide limited funding for specific milestones to be achieved by the companies, and are distinct from more widely used Federal Acquisition Regulation FAR contracts used in most legacy NASA space programs, where NASA owns responsibility for both the design and the program requirements. The 2021 contract with Blue was just the first phase of two by which NASA is aiming to maintain an uninterrupted U.S. presence in low-Earth orbit by transitioning from the International Space Station to other platforms.

In June 2023, ISRO chairman S Somanath told the Times of India that Blue Origin is “very keen” on considering using an Indian rocket as a crew capsule to service its proposed space station Orbital Reef in low-Earth orbit as a part of commercial ventures proposed by ISRO before the launch of the planned Indian Space Station.

By October 2023, NASA reported they had paid out only US$24 million of the $130 million contract for completion of specific milestones. Also in early October, issues between Sierra Space and Blue Origin became public, and CNBC reported that the Orbital Reef website had not been updated in over a year, and that no hiring for the project is currently being done, as both companies have other larger space projects that are higher priorities for them. CNBC also reported that the two partners on the project may go their separate ways. However, after talks between the companies, both companies tweeted on their Twitter accounts on 10 October that they were continuing to work with each other on the contract deliverables for Phase 1.

In March 2024, NASA reported that Blue Origin had passed 4 test milestones relating to Orbital Reef. More critical testing was reported to occur in Summer 2024 with successful burst tests of Sierra Space's LIFE modules.

== Description/design ==
Orbital Reef’s design is reported to be modular in nature, to provide the greatest amount of customization and compatibility. It will reportedly be designed to accept docking from almost every in operation spacecraft like SpaceX Dragon 2, Soyuz (spacecraft), Dream Chaser, and Boeing Starliner.

The initial modules will be the: LIFE, Node, Core, and Research Modules.

== See also ==
- Aurora Space Station – Design concept for a commercial space station
- BA 2100 – Space habitat conceptualized by Bigelow Aerospace
- B330 – Space habitat designed by Bigelow Aerospace
- Bigelow Expandable Activity Module – Experimental inflatable module – Installed on ISS
- Axiom Station – Planned private space station
- Japanese Space Station Module (Mitsui)
- List of commercial space stations
- Starlab (space station) – Planned commercial space station
- Lunar Gateway
- Commercial LEO Destinations program
- Haven-1 by Vast
