= Aurora Space Station =

Design concept for a commercial space station

Station statistics
- Crew: Crew: 2 Tourists: 4
- Launch: 2021 (conceptual)
- Carrier rocket: TBD
- Mission status: Cancelled
- Length: 13.3 m (44 ft)
- Width: 4.3 m (14 ft)
- Pressurised volume: 160 m^{3} (5,700 cu ft)
- Typical orbit altitude: 320 km (200 mi)
- Orbital period: 90 minutes

The Aurora Space Station was a technology concept for a private commercial space station in low Earth orbit that was announced on 5 March 2018 by Orion Span, a startup aerospace company in California, United States funded by Pear Venture and Berkeley SkyDeck. The concept envisions a capacity of six people: two crew and four tourists.

No launch contract has been signed for deployment of the modules nor crewed vehicles, and its construction has not started, but its representatives claimed it would be launched in 2021. In March 2021 the website announced that they had shut down operations and refunded all deposits.

== Overview ==
Frank Bunger, the founder and CEO of Orion Span, stated that the Aurora Station would offer to space tourists a 12-day stay for US$9.5 million. He said that the design concept is such that the station would not require extravehicular activities (spacewalks) for assembly and operation. Orion Span plans to design, test and build the station in Houston, Texas. The company has yet to sign a launch contract, but stated that this commercial station would be deployed in low Earth orbit in 2021, and start to receive passengers in 2022. Bunger said that travelers will be required to complete a three-month training program before launch. Guests would be able to free-float, look out windows, practice hydroponics, and play in a 'hologram deck'.

== See also ==
- Mir
- NewSpace
- Space tourism
- Bigelow Commercial Space Station
