= Axiom Station =

Planned private space station

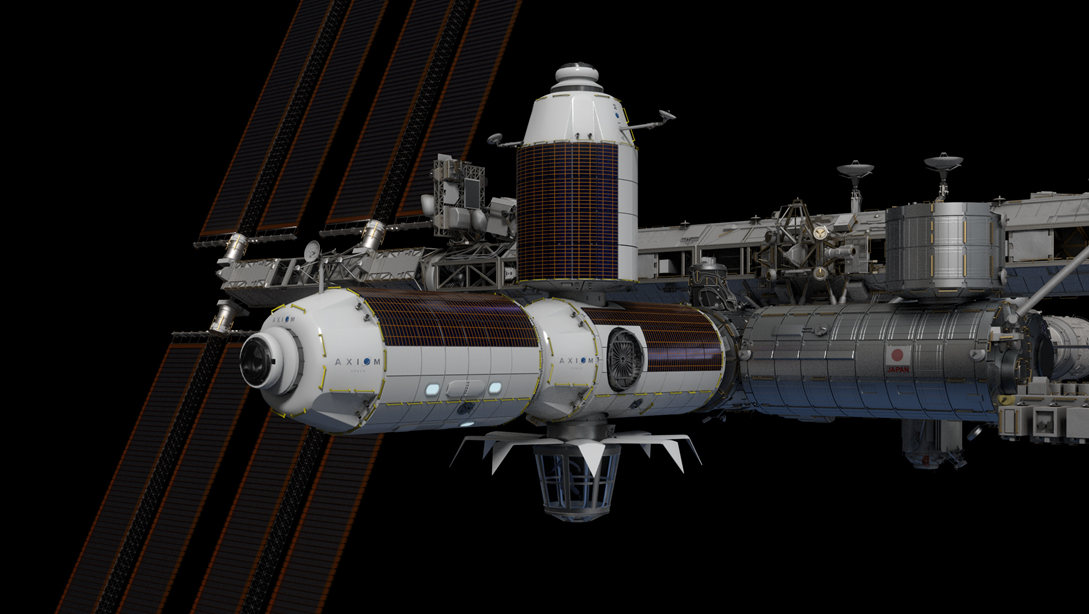
- Artist's rendering of an early concept design for Axiom Station berthed at the forward port of Harmony

Station statistics
- Launch: NET 2028
- Carrier rocket: Undecided
- Launch pad: Undecided
- Mission status: Under construction

Axiom Station is a planned modular space station designed by Houston, Texas-based Axiom Space for commercial space activities. Axiom Space gained initial NASA approval for the venture in January 2020. Axiom Space was later awarded a NASA contract on 28 February 2020. Axiom Station is a NASA Commercial LEO Destinations (CLD) project to build a successor to the International Space Station (ISS) before its decommissioning in 2030.

External image
- Axiom Station modules infographic

== Axiom Segment ==
Between 2020 and 2024, Axiom Space intended to assemble four modules in a dedicated segment docked to the ISS before detaching them to form the free-flying Axiom Station.

Axiom renderings illustrate how the four modules might attach to the ISS as they are berthed and relocated by the Mobile Servicing System using the robotic arm Canadarm2.

The company released preliminary plans in February 2020 for how the Axiom Orbital Segment could form the basis for the Axiom Station, constructed out of the Axiom Segment and additional elements upon ISS retirement and separation, including a power and thermal module with an airlock. The company planned to launch its first four modules in consecutive years starting from the mid-2020s.

The interior concept of the crew quarters of Axiom Orbital Segment was conceived in 2018 by French architect and designer Philippe Starck. Renderings of the habitat show a chamber with walls that are covered with tufted padding and studded with hundreds of color-changing LEDs. The Axiom Orbital Segment is intended to have amenities including high-speed Wi-Fi, video screens, picture windows and a glass-walled cupola – which Axiom calls "the largest window observatory ever constructed for the space environment".

In December 2024, Axiom Space announced a change in their station assembly plans. Instead of assembling the Axiom Orbital Segment at the ISS, the station was now planned to fly independently after the launch of the Habitat One (Hab-1) module. The Payload Power Thermal Module would be launched first and dock with the ISS while awaiting the launch of Hab-1, after which it would detach from the ISS and form the Axiom Station upon connecting with Hab-1.

== Planned modules ==
Each Axiom Station module is an independent spacecraft equipped with all the systems needed to maneuver in orbit, including propulsion.

=== PPTM ===
Axiom's first module, the Payload Power Thermal Module (PPTM), is scheduled to be launched to the ISS no earlier than 2027. PPTM is expected to provide power and thermal capacity equivalent to that of the ISS via solar array. The module will initially be attached to one of two ports currently used by cargo spacecraft before detaching from the ISS to dock with Hab-1 in 2028.

=== Hab-1 ===
Axiom's second module, Habitat One (Hab-1), is expected to be launched no earlier than 2028. It is planned to provide quarters for four crew members and volume to accommodate research and manufacturing applications. Each personal crew quarter is equipped with a large Earth-viewing window and touch-screen communications panel. A docking adapter allows visiting vehicles to dock to the Axiom Station; four radial ports on Hab-1 provide for the addition of future modules and increase the station's docking capability. It will have propulsion, guidance, navigation and station control systems. The first windowed pressurized module is approximately 11 meters long and 4.2 meters in diameter at the widest part. Thales Alenia Space reported significant progress on the fabrication of the module in early 2024.

When Hab-1 is launched into orbit, PPTM will undock from the ISS and dock with Hab-1, forming the initial two-module free-flying Axiom Station.

=== AL ===
Axiom's third module, the Airlock Module (AL), is expected to be launched in the late 2020s. The addition of an airlock module will enable extravehicular activities, making Axiom Station a fully capable space station.

=== Hab-2 ===
Axiom's fourth module, Habitat Two (Hab-2), is expected to be launched after the Airlock Module. It will provide quarters for an additional four crew members allowing the station to support up to eight crew. It provides complete ECLSS support, commercial high data satellite communications and a Canadarm 3 styled remote manipulator system for the Axiom Station.

=== RMF ===
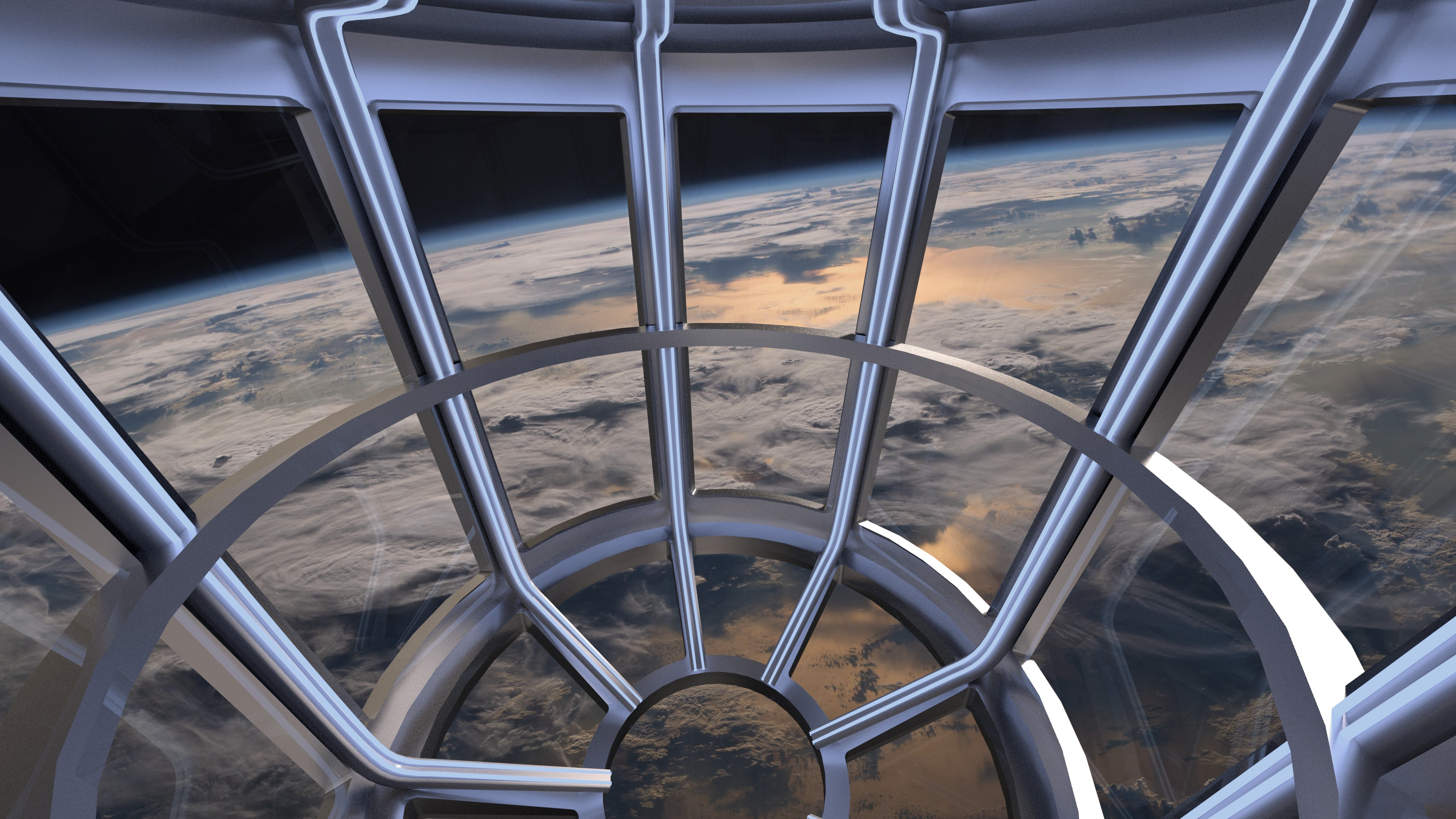
Axiom Earth Observatory interior.

Axiom's fifth module, the Research and Manufacturing Facility Module with Earth Observatory (RMF), is expected to be launched in the early 2030s. It would provide access to the unique microgravity environment as a platform to enable research, product development, process improvement, and space manufacturing. The Earth Observatory is a glass-walled cupola attached to the RMF.

=== SEE-1 ===
External image
- Animation of docked and inflated AxSEE-1.

Axiom Space plans to manufacture the SEE-1 module for the British company Space Entertainment Enterprise (or S.E.E.). It is planned to be a six meter spherical inflatable module that fulfills the purpose of a first entertainment studio in space. SEE-1 is expected to launch after Hab-1.

The directors of SEE, Dmitry Lesnevsky and Elena Lesnevsky, have been pursuing film shootings for a future movie with Tom Cruise at the station. However, due to political reasons, Cruise cancelled the project in December 2025.

=== MPLM ===
The Raffaello Multi-Purpose Logistics Modules (MPLM) is planned to be modified and installed on Axiom Station after the ISS is decommissioned.

== Construction ==
=== Manufacturing ===
Axiom Space signed a contract with Thales Alenia Space for Thales Alenia to manufacture and test the primary structure and the Micrometeoroid & Debris Protection System (or MDPS) for both Hab-1 and Hab-2. Thales Alenia Space is in the process of machining the primary structure of Hab-1. With the completion of the Manufacturing Readiness Review on September 21, 2021, Thales Alenia began welding the cone panels of Hab-1. The primary structure for Hab-1 is expected to be delivered from Italy to Houston, Texas in early 2023 where Axiom Space will complete assembly and integration of all systems before launch.

=== Assembly ===
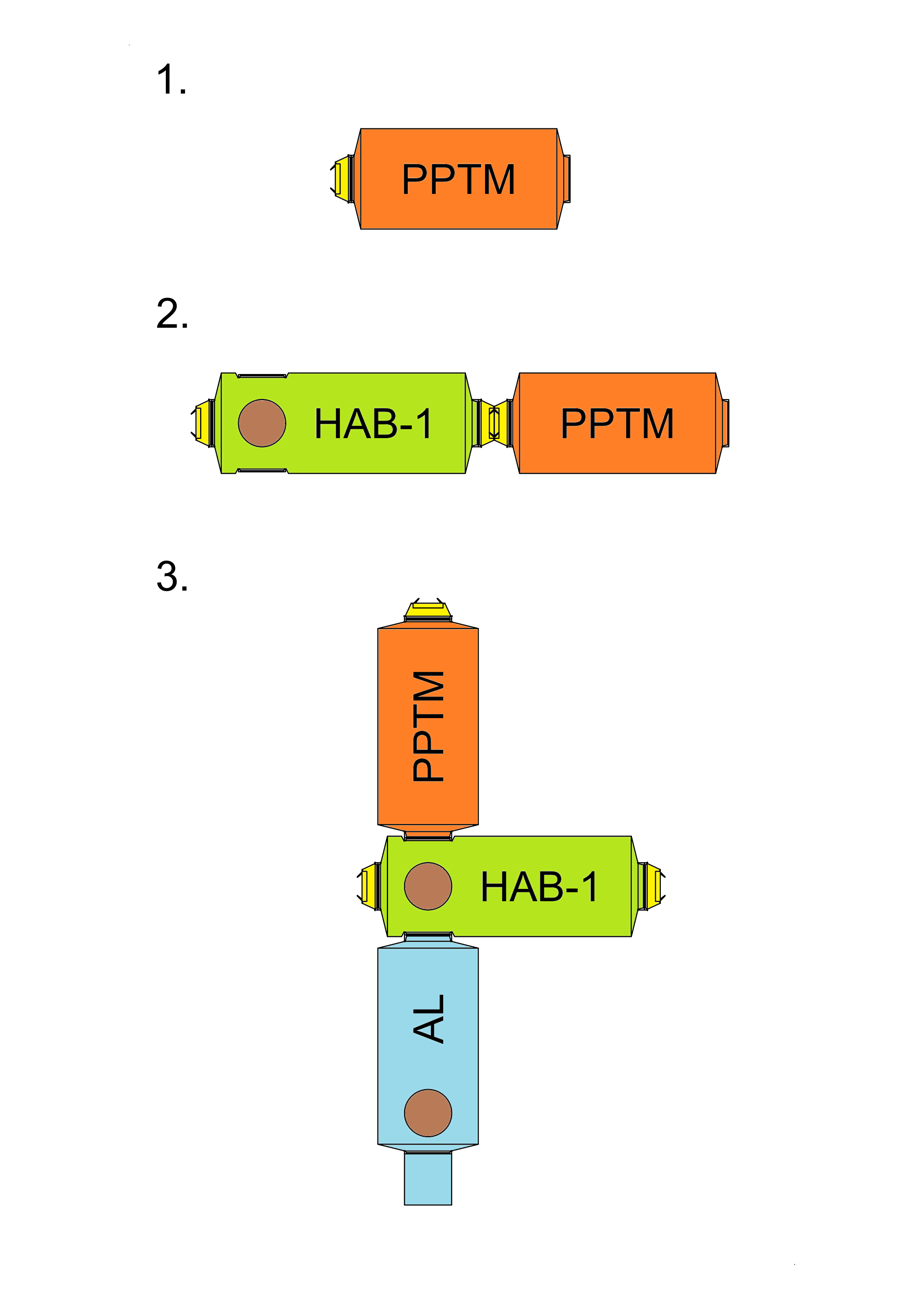
Axiom station – the first three steps of building a station – proposal 2024.

There have been no announcements as to which rocket will carry the Axiom Station modules into Low Earth orbit. The first module, PPTM, is planned to attach to one of two ISS ports currently used by cargo spacecraft. PPTM will separate from the ISS and berth to Hab-1 once that module is launched. The Airlock Module (AL), Hab-2 and RMF will then follow in that order. As Axiom Station is a modular space station, the modules may be moved to different ports as needed.

Axiom is, under agreements between the US and India, looking into diversifying its launch providers and possibly using Indian or European launch systems.

At the 77th International Astronautical Congress on October 21, 2026, Axiom announced that the PPTM was in final assembly and is targeting a 2028 launch with assembly with HAB-1 set for 2029.

== Purpose ==
=== Scientific research ===
Axiom Station is planned to have a lab module, RMF, to provide opportunities for Low Earth orbit research and manufacturing.

=== Commercial station ===
Axiom Station is planned to have space for general commercial use, such as the SEE-1 entertainment module.

== See also ==
- SpaceX Dragon 2 missions
  - Axiom Mission 1 – precursor private crew mission
  - Axiom Mission 2
  - Axiom Mission 3
  - Axiom Mission 4
- Aurora Space Station – Design concept for a commercial space station
- BA 2100 – Space habitat conceptualized by Bigelow Aerospace
- B330 – Space habitat designed by Bigelow Aerospace
- Bigelow Expandable Activity Module – Experimental inflatable module – Installed on ISS
- List of commercial space stations
  - Haven-1
  - Japanese Space Station Module (Mitsui)
  - Orbital Reef – Proposed low Earth orbit space station
  - Starlab Space Station – Planned commercial space station
- Space tourism
