= Sierra Space =

American aerospace, space technology company

Sierra Space Corporation
- Type: Privately Held
- Industry: Aerospace and space technology
- Founded: April 21, 2021
- Founders: Eren Ozmen & Fatih Ozmen
- Headquarters: Louisville, Colorado, United States
- Number of locations: 6
- Area served: United States of America
- Key people: Dan Jablonsky (CEO)
- Products: Space components, subsystems and systems, Dream Chaser, Orbital Reef
- Number of employees: ~2000
- Parent: Sierra Nevada Corporation
- Website: SierraSpace.com

Sierra Space Corporation is a privately held aerospace and space technologies company headquartered in Louisville, Colorado, with additional facilities in Colorado, Wisconsin, Florida, North Carolina and a testing site at the Marshall Space Flight Center in Alabama. The company makes spaceflight hardware for various applications across the industry.

Sierra Space has participated in over 500 space missions and provides over 4,000 space systems and subsystems to its customer base. It is currently developing the Dream Chaser spaceplane, which was selected by NASA to provide services to the International Space Station under NASA's Commercial Resupply Service 2 contract.

== History ==
Sierra Space is a spin-off from Sierra Nevada Corporation that was established as an independent commercial space company in April 2021. Its parent company, the Sierra Nevada Corporation, was a long established aerospace development company which was founded in 1963. Sierra Space operates facilities in 6 states including Colorado, North Carolina, Wisconsin, Florida, Texas, and Alabama.

In 2021, Sierra Space announced its first capital raise, a Series A investment of $1.4 billion that valued the company at $4.5 billion USD.

In October 2022, Blue Origin and Sierra Space received a $130 million contract to jointly develop the world's first commercially owned and operated space station, Orbital Reef. Orbital Reef will be a “mixed-use business park in space in low Earth orbit (LEO) for commerce, research, and tourism".

In April 2023, Sierra Space and ILC Dover announced their partnership for developing of inflatable space station modules and spacesuits. ILC Dover will be the exclusive partner in providing soft goods for Sierra Space's Large Integrated Flexible Environment (LIFE) modules for commercial space stations.

Sierra Space and the United States Air Force announced a partnership in July 2023. Under a 27-month, $22.6 million contract, Sierra Space will develop a 35,000 lbf thrust upper stage engine, known as the Vortex (VR35K-A). Work for the Vortex involves designing flight-weight engine components through the use of component and integrated breadboard engine test data.

In August 2023, Sierra Space announced that it would be collaborating with BioServe Space Technologies to grow hematopoietic stem cells in microgravity to research undergoing treatment for blood cancer. The same month, the company also partnered with Redwire on a biotech experiment platform that will be installed on Sierra Space's commercial space station LIFE module.

Reports in November 2023 indicated that Sierra Space laid off 165 workers in a realignment of the company. There were additional layoffs in October 2024.

Dan Jablonsky, formerly of Ursa Major Technologies and Maxar Technologies, was appointed CEO in February 2026 while founder Fatih Ozmen remained chair.

In March 2026, the company received a $550 million USD Series C funding round led by LimunArx Capital Management that valued the company at $8 billion USD.

== Products ==
Sierra Space provides a mix of products and services in three areas: transportation, destinations, and applications.

=== Transportation ===
Initial cargo flights of the Dream Chaser vehicle are planned under NASA's Commercial Resupply Contract with follow-on cargo, crewed and other missions available for commercial, civil, and national security uses.

On September 8, 2022, Sierra Space announced it signed a CRADA with the United States Transportation Command to develop concepts for using Dream Chaser space planes and Shooting Star cargo modules for “timely global delivery of Department of Defense logistics and personnel."

The first Dream Chaser, DC-101 Tenacity, completed assembly in November 2023. The vehicle will be shipped to NASA's Neil A. Armstrong Test Facility for environmental testing.

=== Destinations ===
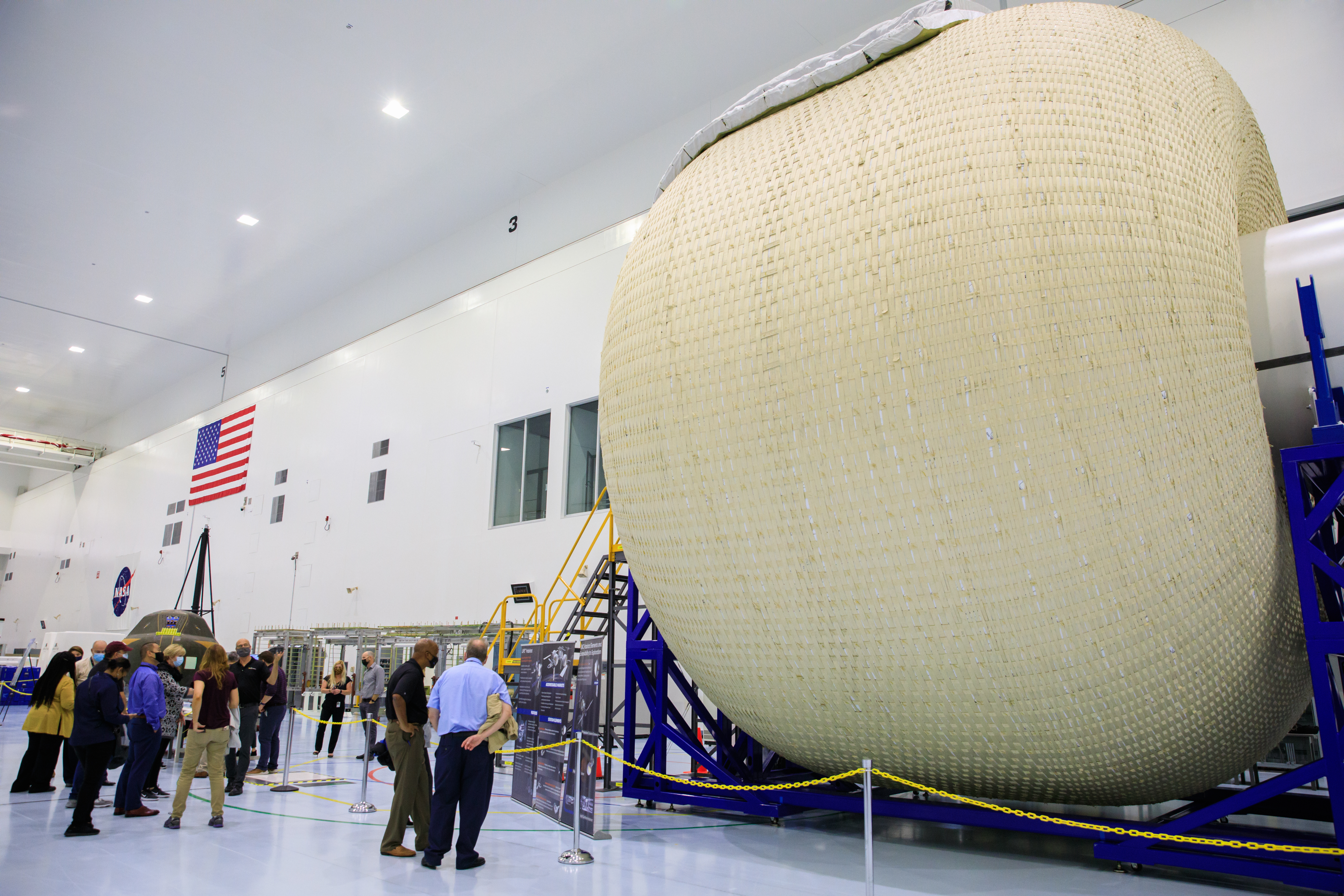
Prototype of LIFE habitat inside the Space Station Processing Facility (2021)

Products from Sierra Space's Destinations organization include the Orbital Reef space station (in partnership with Blue Origin) and the LIFE habitat.

Through NASA's NextSTEP project, Sierra Space completed its successful test in July 2022, which a maximum burst pressure rate of 192 psi. It then completed its second sub-scale ultimate burst pressure test on November 15, 2022 that achieved a 204 psi burst pressure rate. The safety requirement is 182.4 psi. The full-scale LIFE pressure tests began in 2023, and on January 22, 2024 the company announced a successful full scale burst test of the LIFE habitat, exceeding safety margins by 27%.

=== Applications ===
Applications products include three areas:

- Rocket Engines & Propulsion
- Space Technology & Subsystems
- Environmental Systems

=== Satellite Bus Line ===
In early 2024, Sierra announced their own satellite bus line named Velocity, Horizon, and Titan.
