= Bigelow =

Bigelow may refer to:

== Surname ==
- Bigelow (surname), a list of people

== Places in the United States ==
- Bigelow, Arkansas, a town
- Bigelow, Kansas, a town
- Bigelow, Minnesota, a city
- Bigelow Township, a township in Minnesota
- Bigelow, Missouri, a village
- Bigelow Township, a township in Missouri
- Bigelow Neighborhood, a historic community in Olympia, Washington
- Mount Bigelow (Arizona)
- Mount Bigelow (Maine)
- Bigelow Peak, California

== Business ==
- Bigelow Aerospace
  - Bigelow Commercial Space Station, a private space complex under development
- Bigelow Tea Company
- C. O. Bigelow, the oldest surviving apothecary-pharmacy in the United States

== Other uses ==
- USS Bigelow, a US Navy destroyer
- Bigelow Expandable Activity Module, a module attached to the International Space Station, developed by Bigelow Aerospace
- Bigelow School (disambiguation), two American schools on the National Register of Historic Places

== See also ==
- Deuce Bigalow, protagonist of two films, Deuce Bigalow: Male Gigolo and Deuce Bigalow: European Gigolo
