= Mount Bigelow =

Mount Bigelow may refer to:

- Mount Bigelow (Arizona), in the Santa Catalina Mountains, United States
- Mount Bigelow (Maine), in the Appalachian Mountains, United States
- Mount Bigelow (Washington), in the North Cascades, United States

== See also ==
- Bigelow Peak, in California
- Bigelow Mountain Preserve, in Maine
- Bigelow (disambiguation)
