= Pacifica Beauty =

American cosmetics company

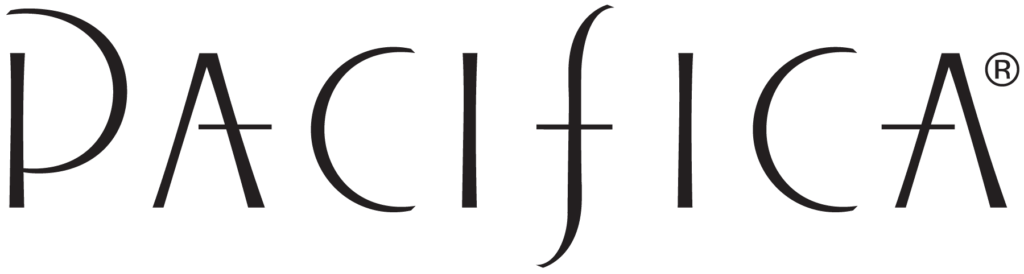
- Company type: Private
- Industry: Cosmetics
- Founded: 1996; 30 years ago in Portland, Oregon, United States
- Founders: Brook Harvey-Taylor; Billy Taylor
- Headquarters: Carpinteria, California, United States
- Area served: Worldwide
- Key people: Eric Reiter (CEO)
- Products: Cosmetics, skincare, hair care, perfume, dietary supplements
- Website: pacificabeauty.com

Pacifica Beauty is an American cosmetics company based in Carpinteria, California. It was founded in 1996 by Brook Harvey-Taylor and Billy Taylor in Portland, Oregon.

Pacifica specializes in vegan and cruelty-free beauty products.

== History ==
=== 1996–2007: Early history ===
Pacifica Beauty was founded in 1996 by Billy Taylor and Brook Harvey-Taylor, who conceived the idea after a surfing trip in Baja. Harvey-Taylor, raised on a cattle ranch in Montana, had studied aromatherapy in Eugene, Oregon, where she met Billy Taylor, a former photographer and filmmaker. The company initially produced scented candles and perfumes, blended in the founders' kitchen and first sold at a trade fair in San Francisco. Utilizing advances in synthetic biology, Harvey-Taylor developed products that incorporated vegan collagen and ceramides, all without animal testing.

=== 2007–present: Pacifica Beauty ===
By 2008, Pacifica had reached approximately US$12 million in annual revenue. The brand transitioned into the beauty industry in 2007 with the introduction of spray perfumes, and in March 2009 it launched in U.S. Sephora stores, followed shortly afterwards by C.O. Bigelow.

In November 2016, Pacifica received a minority growth equity investment from private equity firm Alliance Consumer Growth. In 2018, the brand launched an upcycling program in partnership with Preserve, through which used beauty packaging was collected and reprocessed into toothbrushes and razors. In 2019, Pacifica entered the dietary supplements category, and the same year announced the closure of its Portland factory and warehouse.

In October 2020, Pacifica launched in Canada through 780 Shoppers Drug Mart stores.

In January 2022, Brentwood Associates made a minority investment in Pacifica, and Nathalie Kristo, a former L'Oréal executive and former president and CEO of Huda Beauty in North America, was appointed CEO, with Harvey-Taylor moving to the role of president. In April 2022, Pacifica announced its launch on the UK high street through Superdrug. During the same year, Pacifica expanded initiated partnerships with Cult Beauty and Douglas.

== Products ==
Among Pacifica's products are the Glow Baby franchise, Seek Balance, Glow Greens, Wake Up Beautiful, Slay All Day, and Stellar Gaze Mascara.

In 2019, Pacifica introduced supplements to its product range. During COVID-19, Pacifica introduced reusable masks. In 2021, Pacifica added gummies to its product line.
