= Biglow =

Biglow is a surname. Notable people with the surname include:

- Abe L. Biglow (1872–1923), American politician and businessman
- John Biglow (born 1957), American rower
- Lucius Horatio Biglow (1885–1961), American football player and coach

== See also ==
- Bigelow (surname)
