= Erectable Modular Space Station =

Experimental inflatable Space Laboratory

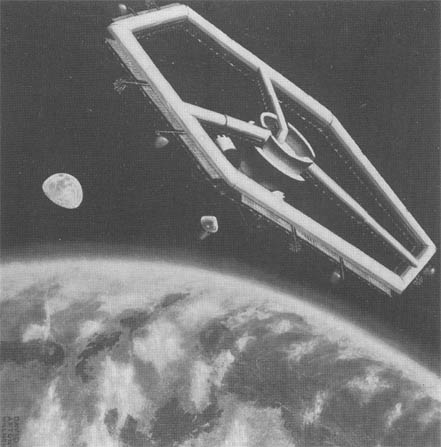
- Artists rendition of the EMSS in orbit

Station statistics
- Carrier rocket: Saturn 1 (planned)
- Mission status: Cancelled
- Length: 150 feet
- Width: 150 feet

The Erectable Modular Space Station (EMSS) was a project by NASA from 1961 to 1962 to develop what would have been the world's first Space Station, largely continuing off the development of the earlier Erectable Torus Manned Space Laboratory (ETMSL). When completed, the EMSS would have consisted of an inflatable 150-foot diameter hexagon with a crew of up to 21 that would then spin to provide artificial gravity launched on a Saturn 1. Although the initial feasibility study was positive and NASA engineers believed they could complete the project EMSS would not receive any further funding due to the consolidation of resources into Project Apollo.

== Background ==
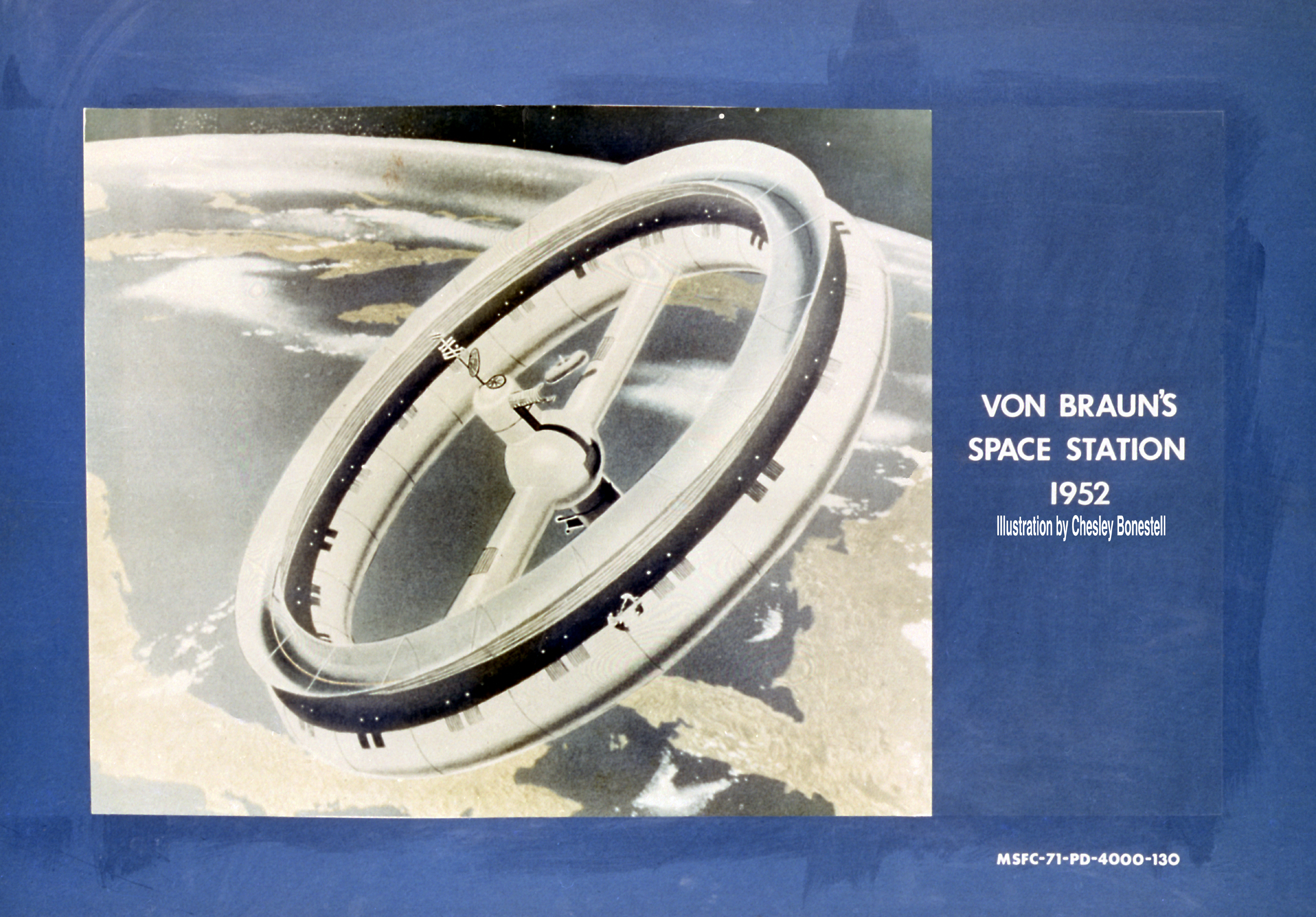
1952 concept art of Wernher von Braun's envisioned 250-foot diameter inflatable nylon ring-shaped space station that could provide artificial gravity.

In 1923 Austro-Hungarian born German physicist Hermann Oberth published Die Rakete zu den Planetenraumen considered by NASA to contain the "first serious proposal for a manned space station" in which he envisioned space operations being centered out of a large wheel shaped station that would rotate to produce artificial gravity. The paper was deeply influential on German physicists and especially the Weimar era youth, including Wernher von Braun, who, after the war, continued to press for a wheel-shaped station.

Between 1952 and 1954 von Braun published Man Will Conquer Space Soon! in Collier's which outlined his vision for peaceful scientific exploration of space with the centerpiece of his plan being a 250-foot diameter inflatable wheel-shaped station since dubbed the "von Braun wheel". Starting in 1960 the Langley Research Center (LaRC) began to explore the feasibility of a number of different space station configurations. LaRC was unimpressed with designs from industry partners and instead chose a rotating toroid design outlined by Emanuel Schnitzer's technical paper titled A Manned Orbital Space Laboratory.

During the development of Schnitzer's "Erectable Torus Manned Space Laboratory" two major engineering problems where encountered. The first being the instability of the rotating toroid caused by crew movements which according to computer simulations would have caused the station to tumble out of control. The second was the issue of either micrometeorites or the crew puncturing the thin walls of the inflated structure which would've resulted in depressurization and the death of the crew.

== Development ==
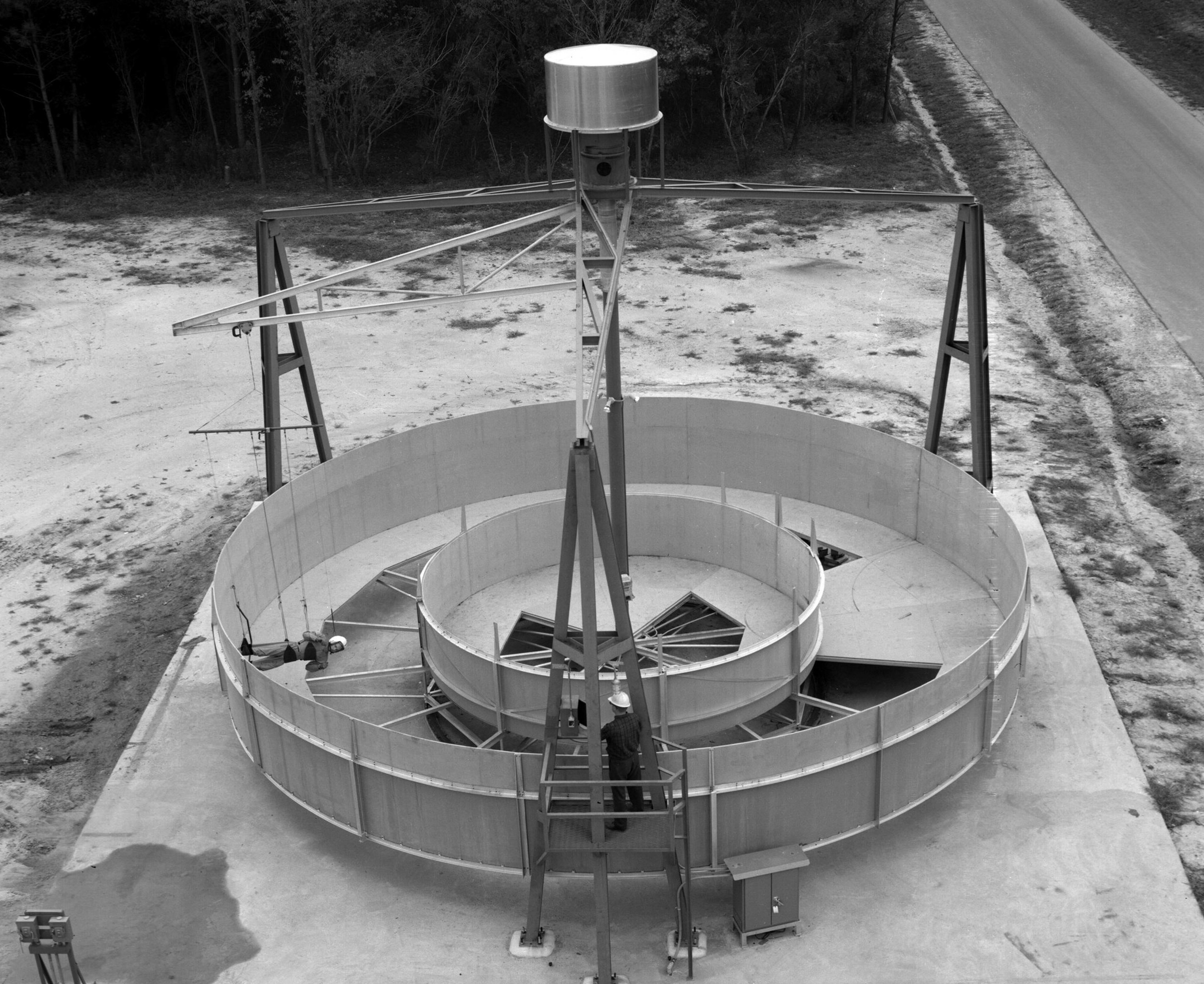
The simulator created by NASA for researching artificial gravity. Test subjects could only last an average of 2 hours before being removed due to intense nausea.

Langley Engineer Rene Berglund had been one of the critics of the ETMSL and its stability problems, and proposed the EMSS as a better option while retaining its core design. Initially, the EMSS was designed to have a rotation radius of 100ft , but was reduced down to 75ft (for a total diameter of 150ft), a figure Berglund arrived at as being the minimum diameter allowing for stable rotations to produce 1g of artificial gravity on board. Both the EMSS and ETMSL would be developed simultaneously, although the EMSS outlived the ETMSL which was cancelled in the early months of 1962.

The station would have consisted of two parts, the rotating hexagonal modules, and a central static hub that would have been where crew and supply shuttles docked with three tunnels connecting the two. The static hub would've been connected to the modules via inflated tunnels, and kept independent of the rotation via bearings. A series of four pulse jets would be mounted at 90 degree intervals around the outside rim of the station to reorient the station and dampen wobbles when necessary. The EMSS also abandoned the mercury boiler system for heat and power generation in favor of the emerging technology of photovoltaic solar cells although some engineers proposed an on-board nuclear reactor instead due to the required R&D efforts to develop solar panels capable of providing enough power, although this would have required a heavier mass for radiation shielding for the crew.

Langley engineers also started work on lightweight and dependable life support systems that would have provided oxygen, food, and water, as well as accommodations for sleeping, exercising, washing and other bodily functions. Engineers envisioned a closed water recycling system, which would've seen astronauts drink their own purified urine a technology that, as of 2026, has yet to be developed. A simulator was constructed at Langley where volunteers would experience the rotations and artificial gravity required by the station, but in each case the volunteers requested, or outright demanded, to be removed after a few hours due to nausea caused by the Coriolis effect.

One of the key engineering problems of the ETMSL was the issue of micrometeorite punctures, with the EMSS designed with airlocks between each segment that could be closed in the event of loss of pressure, allowing the crew to seal compromised modules. Additionally, the EMSS would have been sheathed in a "meteoroid bumper" made out of flexible honeycombed aluminum although NASA struggled with developing methods to test its suitability of stopping micrometeorites. Much like the ETMSL the EMSS's interior modules would have been made out of an elastomer material with nylon-neoprene, dacron-silicone, saran, Mylar, polypropylene, and Teflon options being explored.

Initially, Langley pursued launching the station on an in-house Scout rocket, however, the Scout did not have the capacity to launch the 171,000lb. Langley then looked into using the Centaur, however, NASA overruled them stating the Centaur was not yet rated for human spaceflight. Ultimately, the development team decided on using a Saturn 1 with its 210,000lb payload capacity. Crew and supplies would be sent to the station with Apollo CSMs either launched on Saturn 1 or Titan III rockets. Some of the only physical hardware developed for the EMSS was the adapter that would've mated the station to the upper stage of the Saturn 1, designed by Berglund himself. The station would have been folded to fit into the faring, and then a series of mechanical hinges would've enabled the interconnected modules to fold out into one compact mass with a series of retractable spokes and screw-jack actuators.

NASA financed a 6-month feasibility study on the EMSS concept by North American Aviation (NAA) over the summer of 1961 narrowly beating out Douglas. In July 1962 Langley held a symposium offering updates on their space station research where they stated that they were moving ahead with the rotating hexagon, and provided a 15ft scale model made by NAA. They also reiterated that they had not yet discovered an optimal design, and that the station was a "conceptual design." Langley estimated that the total cost for the station would have been $100 million USD, which was also the same price that the United States Air Force quoted for their Manned Orbiting Laboratory, which NASA agreed to. In Berglund's report on the study, he reported that 30 configurations where studied by NAA who concluded that the 75ft radius hexagon was the best design due to ease of packaging and deployment.

=== Cancellation ===
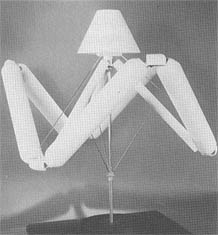
Scale model of the EMSS partially deployed.

While the feasibility study found the concept was viable, with both NAA and Langley Engineers awaiting further funding from NASA to begin development of hardware, funding for the space station program would be redirected to Project Apollo, especially after development of the Saturn V started. George Low reported that in 1962 NASA's budget only accounted for enough money to finish Project Mercury, with $29 million left over which was already earmarked for Apollo which at that point entailed only a circumlunar mission. Low also argued that the space station was not required for project Apollo and therefore NASA had no reason to further fund its development.

Then President John F. Kennedy outlined that a space station would be a by-product of Project Apollo, with no need to develop one in the interim. Langley's space station team would shift to work on the Manned Orbital Research Laboratory (MORL) which would've used technologies from Project Apollo for a more focused design effort.

== Legacy ==
Despite the project's cancellation, von Braun and his team still pressed for the development of wheel-like station in the form of the Orbital Launch Facility which would've acted as a hub where rockets destined for the moon would be assembled in orbit, reducing the weight otherwise needed for a launch from the surface of the earth.

From 1963 to 1964, the "Phase I" MORL designed by NAA design still largely resembled Berglund's hexagon, however, in April 1963 NASA finally abandoned the requirement for artificial gravity on their first space station, with Boeing and Douglas taking the lead on "Phase II" which would have been a Saturn 1 upper stage refit into a laboratory, with two horizontal docking ports allowing crew rotations.

With Project Apollo a number of space station designs would be proposed as part of the Apollo Applications Program but none of which included artificial gravity or a wheel shape.

== Gallery ==
Markup of the EMSS

The non-rotating core section of the EMSS with docking facilities

The EMSS' docking ports, complete with a robotic catch arm

== See also ==
- Erectable Torus Manned Space Laboratory
