= Erectable Torus Manned Space Laboratory =

Experimental inflatable Space Laboratory

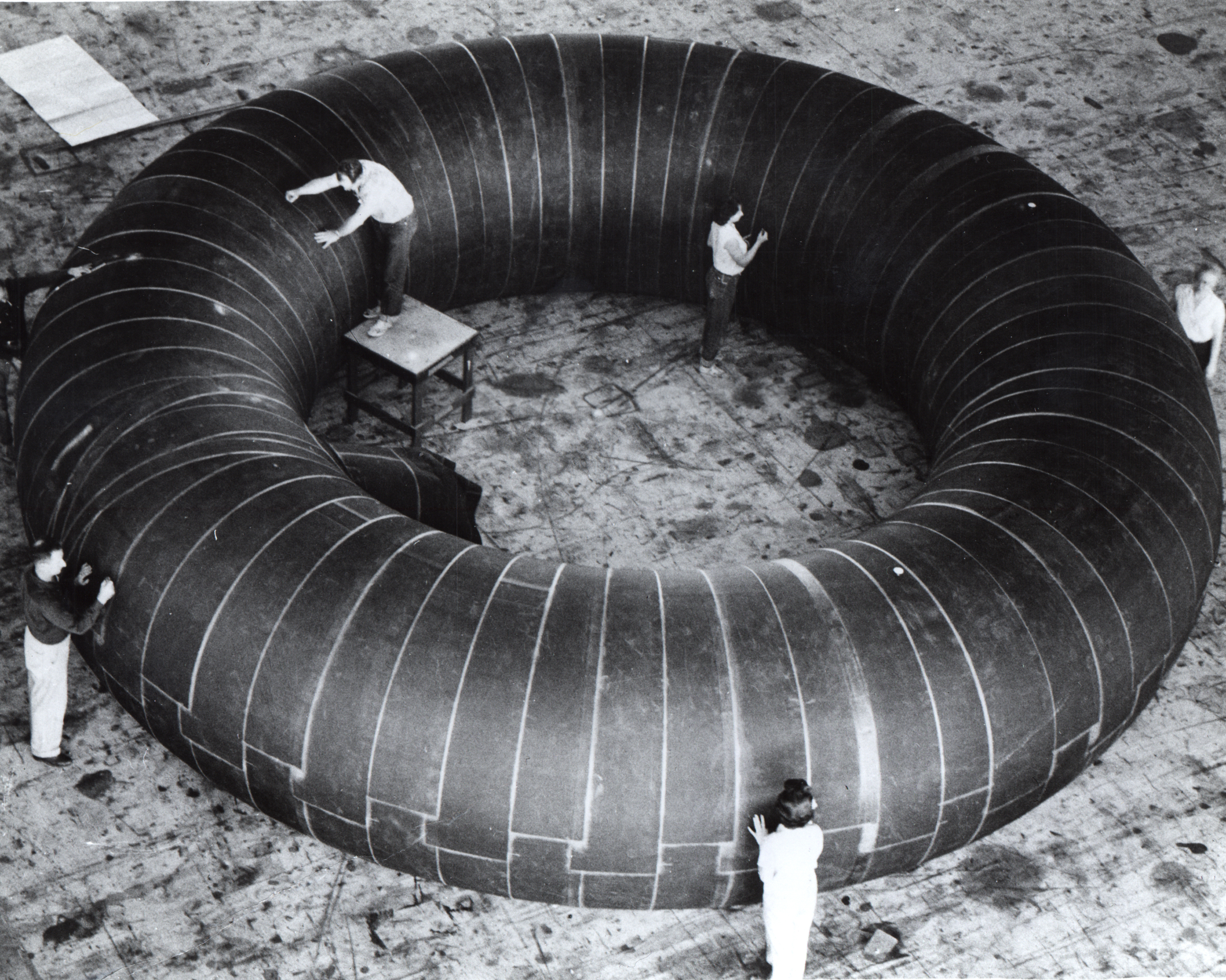
- Langley engineers working on the prototype ETMSL in May 1961.

Station statistics
- Carrier rocket: Atlas LV-3B (planned)
- Mission status: Cancelled
- Length: 24 feet
- Width: 24 feet

The Erectable Torus Manned Space Laboratory (ETMSL) was a cancelled NASA project in development from 1960 to 1962 to create the first space station using technology from Project Mercury. The station would've been a 24 foot inflated nylon toroid with a crew of up to 6 astronauts that would perform a prolonged stay while spinning to create 1g of artificial gravity. The planned station was quickly cancelled due to fears the crew or a micrometeorite would puncture its thin walls or that the crew's movement could cause the station to tumble out of control.

== Background ==
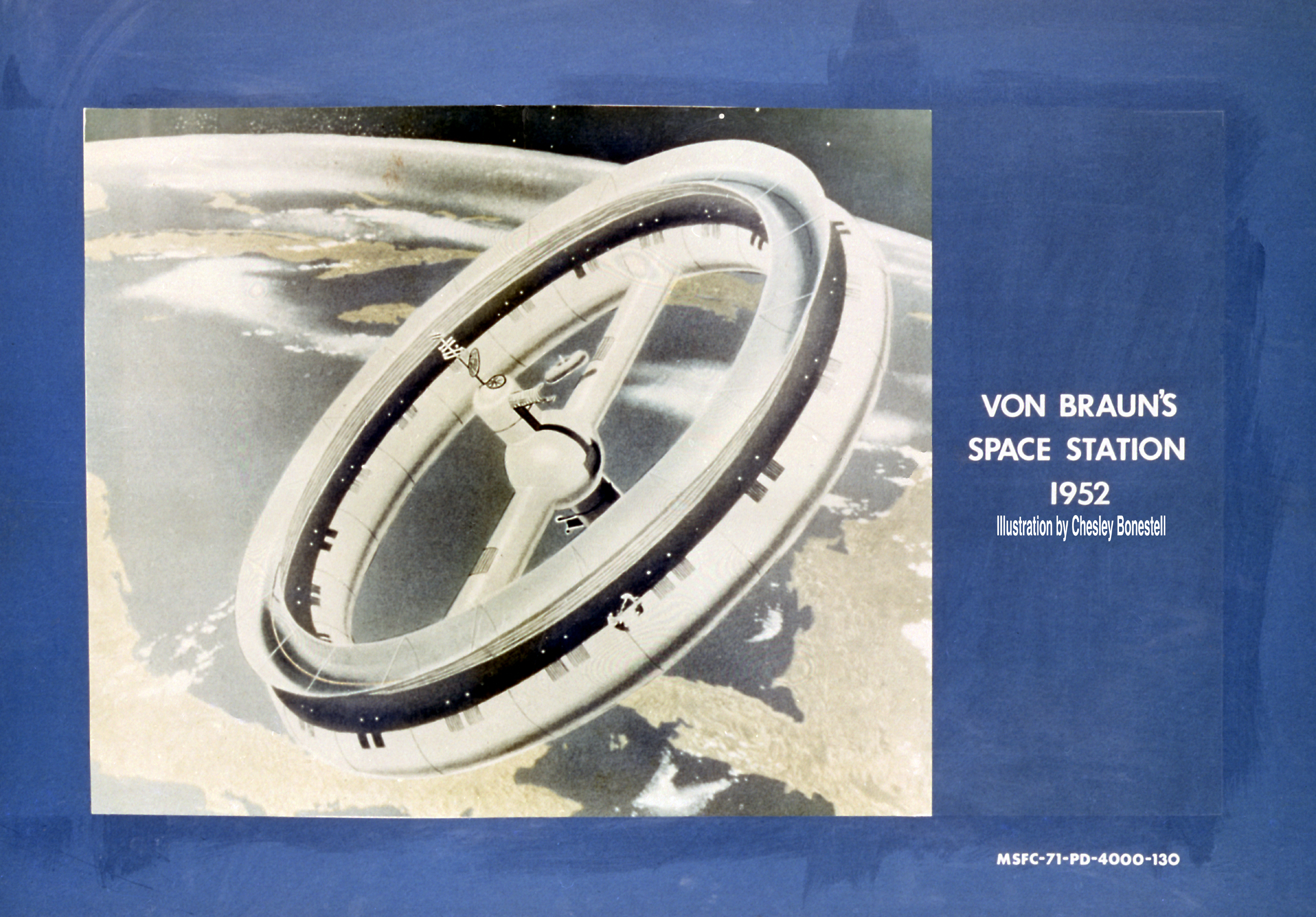
1952 concept art of Wernher von Braun's envisioned 250-foot diameter inflatable nylon ring-shaped space station that could provide artificial gravity.

In 1923 Austro-Hungarian born German physicist Hermann Oberth published Die Rakete zu den Planetenraumen considered by NASA to contain the "first serious proposal for a manned space station" in which he envisioned space operations being centered out of a large wheel shaped station that would rotate to produce artificial gravity. The paper was deeply influential on German physicists and especially the Weimar era youth, including Wernher von Braun, who, during his interrogation by the Air Materiel Command in 1945 after World War II, stated that his V-2 rocket would open the door to the use of rocket power for both space exploration and space militarization and also called for a wheel-shaped space station.

By early 1946 he was working for United States Army Ordnance Department to help American engineers reverse engineer the V-2. In may 1946 when asked about the feasibility of putting a nuclear warhead on a V-2 he instead proposed a wheel-shaped space station to deliver pre-emptive nuclear strikes on the Soviet Union. Between 1952 and 1954 von Braun published Man Will Conquer Space Soon! in Collier's which outlined his vision for peaceful scientific exploration of space with the centerpiece of his plan being a 250-foot diameter inflatable wheel-shaped station since dubbed the "von Braun wheel".

Starting in 1960 the Langley Research Center (LaRC) began to explore the feasibility of a number of different space station configurations. Industry partners proposed several different designs including spinning cylinders dubbed "cans" that where rejected for being dynamically unstable and traditional wheel or "hub and spoke" designs that where rejected due to nausea caused by the Coriolis effect.

== Development ==
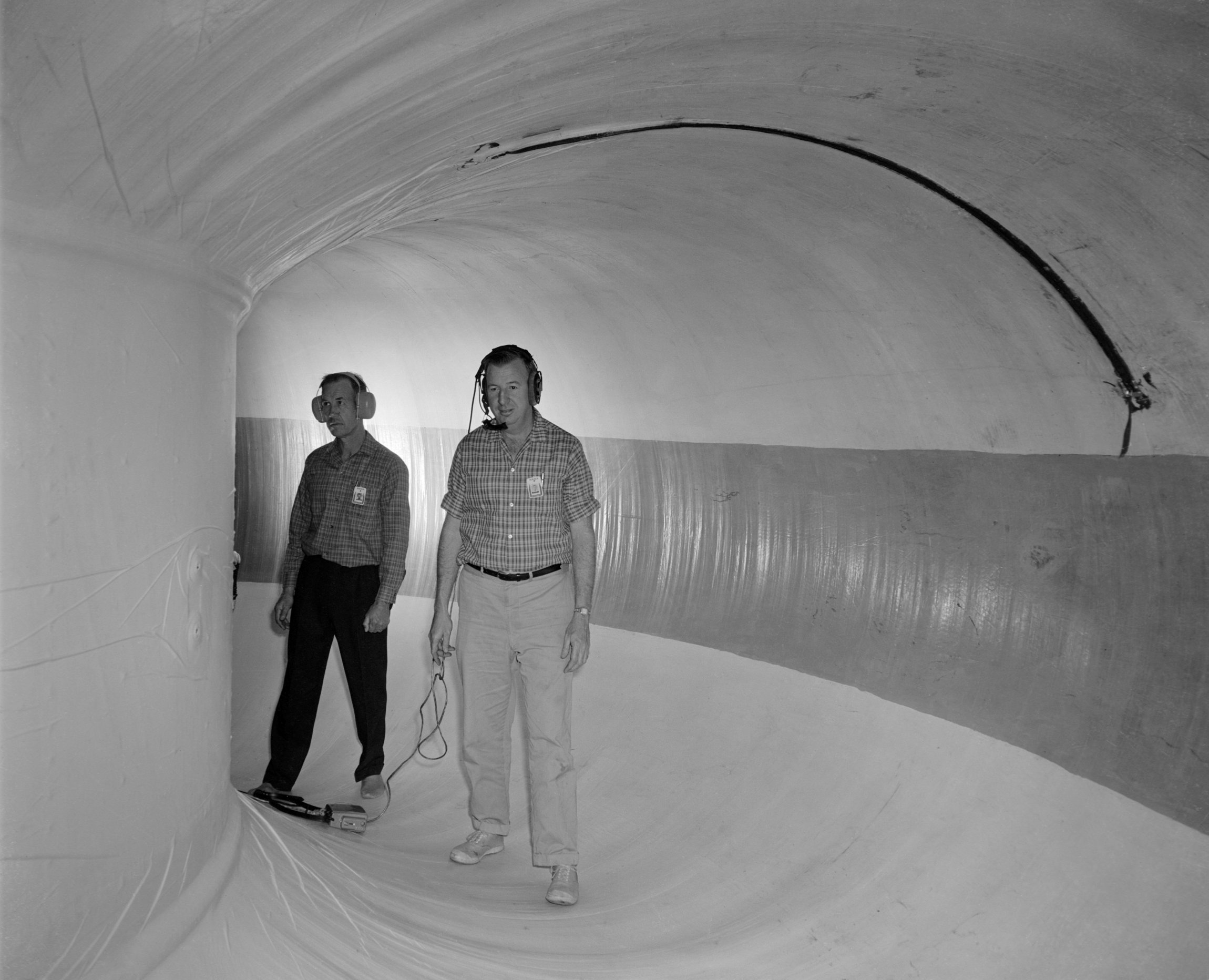
Langley engineers inside the ETMSL prototype in January 1962

On September 12, 1960, LaRC's Emanuel Schnitzer published a technical paper titled A Manned Orbital Space Laboratory. The paper outlined the station as consisting of an inflatable torus that would act as a laboratory and living quarters, and a central solar collector that would reflect solar radiation into a hemispherical mercury boiler to power a turbogenerator to provide electricity and heat. The station would rotate at 6 rotations per minute to achieve a theoretical 1g. Heat would be regulated by a window to the boiler that the crew would manually cover and uncover as needed to achieve 70°F within 10° of variation. The torus would also be constructed of a material with sufficient radiation characteristics that if the station where to tumble that habitable temperatures would still be maintained, initially suggesting a reflective metal coating on elastomer. In his paper Schnitzer noted that life support technologies would have to be developed such as passive refrigerators.

Unimpressed with their industry partners and despite its limitations LaRC selected Schnitzer's proposal as the first space station design that NASA would seriously pursue. Schnitzer co-led a team with Paul Hill with assistance from the Goodyear Aircraft Corporation to create a prototype 24-foot torus for the stations main body. By April Schnitzer presented the station to the American Rocket Society where it was dubbed the "Erectable Torus Manned Space Laboratory" The station would have been launched from an Atlas LV-3B at just 2% of its volume before inflating once in orbit.

=== Cancellation ===
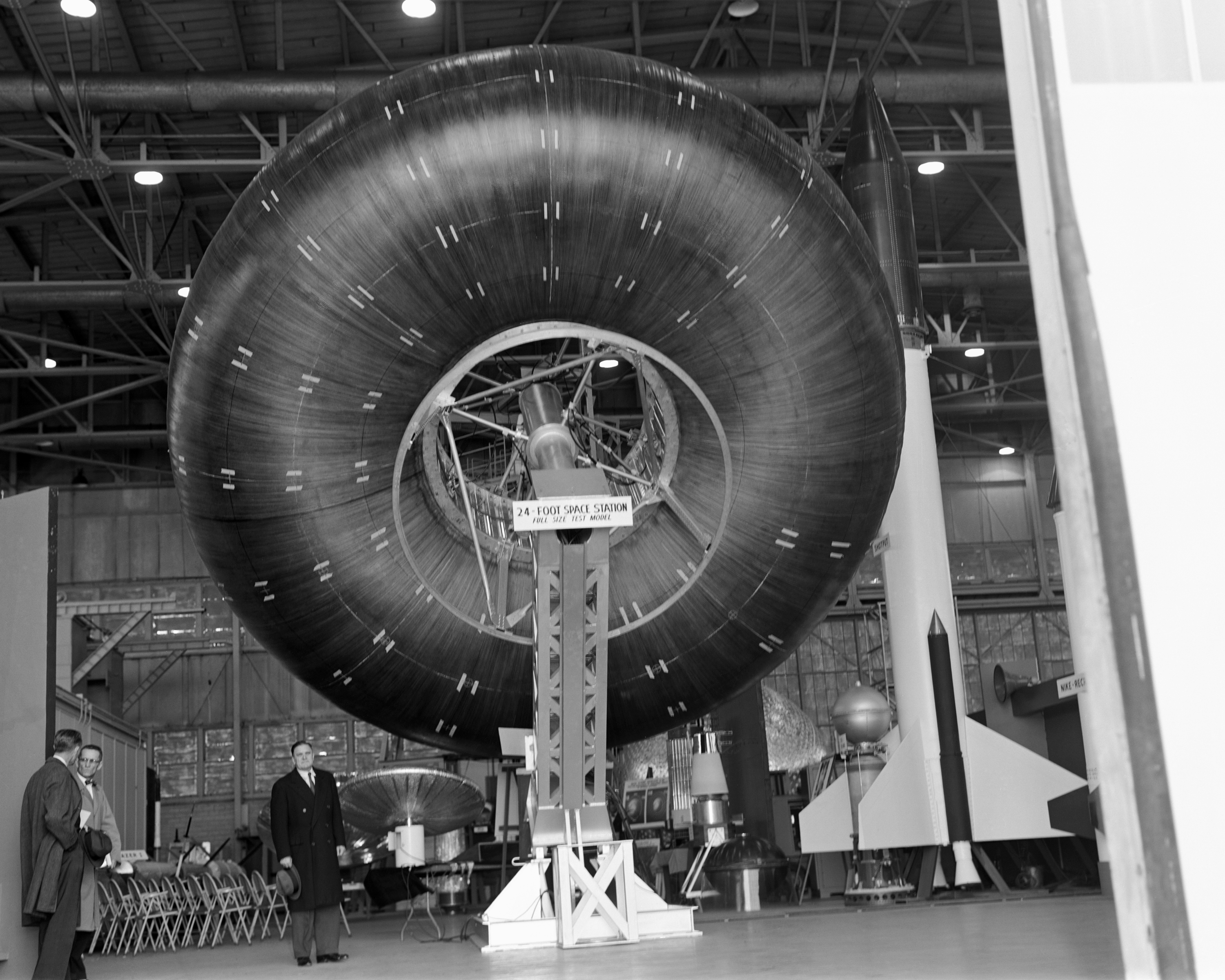
The Erectable Torus Manned Space Laboratory on display in 1961.

Almost immediately after development on the prototype started other LaRC engineers began to voice skepticism over the concept pointing to many of the same micrometeorite issues from Project Echo. The ETMSL prototype would be constructed out of three-ply nylon cords held together by butyl elastomer that would have been extremely susceptible to penetration. NASA engineers especially worried that the thin material would be easily punctured by the crew in normal operations. Another issue would be that the torus also had fragile dynamics while spinning and could very easily tumble out of control. Work on the mercury boilers and condensers, which was contracted to Thompson, Ramo, and Wooldridge (TRW) would continue as part of NASA's Sunflower Auxiliary Power Plant project.

NASA would run computer simulations that showed that the mass distribution changing just by a crew member walking from one side to the other would produce a significant wobble. In order to determine if this wobble might cause the station to totally tumble out of control a section prototype, this time 10-feet across, would be built. By the time the second prototype was complete in summer of 1961 LaRC had abandoned the ETMSL due to the cost to fix its limitations and instead explored other ideas, namely Rene A. Berglund's proposed Erectable Modular Space Station an inflatable 150-foot diameter spinning-hexagon. In December 1961 the full-scale mock-up of the ETMSL was presented to NASA Administrator James E. Webb during his tour of the facility before it was quietly destroyed in early 1962. The ETMSL also saw significant media scrutiny, being described as "too inelegant" and as an "oversize automobile tire."

== Legacy ==
NASA would entirely abandon its inflatable space station concept as Berglund's hexagon would've been too large for any existing rocket to launch, so efforts where instead redirected solely to the Saturn V and Apollo Programs. Due to the influence of the von Braun wheel within NASA the agency insisted that their first space station provide artificial gravity and be deployed with just a single launch, setting them significantly behind the Soviet Union who would launch the first station, Salyut 1, in 1971. It wouldn't be until 2016 when NASA again considered an inflatable space station in the form of the Bigelow Expandable Activity Module which would join to the International Space Station.

== See also ==
- Erectable Modular Space Station
