= Paul R. Hill =

American aerodynamicist

Paul Richard Hill (1909–1990) was a mid–twentieth-century American aerodynamicist. He was a leading research and development engineer and manager for NASA (National Aeronautics and Space Administration) and its predecessor, NACA (the National Advisory Council for Aeronautics) between 1939 and 1970, retiring as Associate Chief, Applied Materials and Physics Division at the NASA Langley Research Center. He is arguably most widely known today as the author of Unconventional Flying Objects: a Scientific Analysis.

== Background ==
Hill was born in Odebolt, Iowa in February 1909. After graduating with a B.S. in mechanical engineering from University of California, Berkeley in 1936, he was a professor of aeronautics at the Polytechnic College of Engineering in Oakland, California for three years before joining the National Advisory Committee of Aeronautics (NACA) in 1939. He continued to work in a range of senior R&D management roles when NACA became the National Aeronautics and Space Administration (NASA) in 1958 at the NASA Langley Research Center. Hill was married to Frances Hoback Hill (d. 1999). They had one daughter, Julie M. Hill. Paul Richard Hill died on April 9, 1990, in the James River Regional Convalescent Centre, Newport News, Virginia, USA.

The Paul R Hill Special Collection is held by the Archives of American Aerospace. He was awarded NASA's Exceptional Service Medal in 1969. This award was "… granted for significant achievement or service characterized by unusual initiative or creative ability that clearly demonstrates substantial improvement in engineering, administrative space flight, or space-related endeavors which contribute to NASA programs". In 1970 Hill received a citation for outstanding scientific leadership for "directing research applicable to space laboratories and other spacecraft."

== NACA and NASA research ==
During the Second World War Hill co-authored a number of technical NACA papers, focusing on aerodynamic aspects of aircraft performance. Hill was also involved in NACA collaboration with the Republic Aircraft Company, assisting in the design of the highly successful P-47 fighter. Hill's specific role was in the aerodynamic design. In the immediate post war period Hill made a number of significant contributions to the development of ram jet technology, including establishing and supervising the Wallops Island ram jet test flight programme and authoring the first NACA technical paper on ram jet technology.

By the early 1950s, in part inspired by his personal interest in the 'flying saucer' or 'UFO' phenomenon, Hill began experimenting in his own time with kinesthetically controlled flying platforms. This led to an official project, which Hill initiated with Charles Zimmerman, who had been independently working on similar concepts for some time. This project designed and test flew such platforms in collaboration with the United States Air Force, the Royal Canadian Air Force and the US Office of Naval Research. The increased understanding of the aerodynamic and performance characteristics of such platforms informed future design work for the Apollo Lunar Module (LM), other VTOL designs and experiments with disc shaped aircraft in the period.

In the early 1950s Hill was part of a specially-assembled advisory panel of "great men"; aerodynamicists advising Sandia Labs on problems encountered with the design of the second generation bombs (H Bombs). In addition to Hill, who at this time headed NACA's Pilotless Aircraft Division, the "great men" listed by Dr Robert F Brodsky of Sandia Labs in his memoir were Jack Northrop (founder of Northrop Aircraft), George Schairer (Chief of aerodynamics at Boeing), Ira H. Abbott ("a legendary engineer"), Ed Heinemann (Chief engineer Douglas Aircraft), Dr. Alex Charters ("a famous ballistician"), Al Sibilia (Vought aircraft chief of aerodynamics), Dr. Charles Poor (Chief Scientist Army's Ballisic Research Laboratory), and "several other distinguished engineers". It was Hill and Charters, however, whom Brodsky called the "heroes". Hill's specific contribution was in diagnosing the aerodynamic problems in the bomb design, though Brodsky acknowledges that at the time they were ignored until a year later when the Sandia scientists realized they were right. "Both experts were correct, but they were too far ahead of us technically".

In 1956 the US Air Force established project HYWARDS, with the aim of developing a hypersonic design capable of up to Mach 12, as a successor to the X-15. The aerospace historian, James Hansen notes that a number of NACA engineers later joined the initial HYWARDS study group at Langley Research Centre "notably Paul Hill, configuration and propulsion…". Hill made a number of important contributions, particularly in the design of hypersonic wind tunnels.

By 1959 Hill became involved in research for a future lunar mission. A lunar study group was established under the leadership of Clint Brown who asked for the participation of six of "Langley's most thoughtful analysts: David Adamson, Supersonic Aerodynamics Division; Paul R. Hill, PARD; John C. Houbolt, Dynamic Loads Division; Albert A. Schy, Stability Research Division; Samuel Katzoff, Full-Scale Research Division; and Bill Michael of his own Theoretical Mechanics Division". This was one of many study groups to examine a lunar mission during the period, with arguably its major contribution being in initiating the concept of rendezvous in orbit between a lander and a main spacecraft.".

Space station research began in earnest at NASA-Langley in the early 1960s and Hill played a prominent role. The historian James Hansen describes Hill as one of two " key members of Langley's early space station research" (along with Robert Osborne), with again much of Hill's pioneering work feeding into later developments. From 1960 to 1962 he co-led a team with Emanuel Schnitzer to develop the Erectable Torus Manned Space Laboratory, a 24-foot inflatable von Braun wheel complete with artificial gravity that was cancelled due to fears of puncture of its thin nylon walls.

"Of all those who contributed to the Moon decision, the ones farthest in the background were the engineers of Langley and Goddard and Marshall, many of whom devoted their lives to spaceflight, designing dreams ...".

== Interest in unidentified flying objects (UFOs) ==
Hill maintained a long-term interest in Unidentified Flying Objects. He had two personal UFO sightings. The first, on July 16, 1952, was with his future wife, Frances Hoback, and was reported to the USAF Blue Book project. This sighting was officially classified as aeroplanes as a flight of bombers were in the area. The then head of Blue Book, Captain (later Major) Edward Ruppelt was later to write of the case, however,

"The only possible solution to the sighting was that the two men [sic] had seen airplanes. We investigated this report and found that there were several B-26's from Langley AFB in the area at the time of the sighting, but none of the B-26 pilots remembered being over Hampton Roads. In fact, all of them had generally stayed well south of Norfolk until about 10:30P.M. because of thunderstorm activity northwest of Langley. Then there were other factors - the observers heard no sound and they were away from all city noises, aircraft don't carry just one or two amber lights, and the distance between the two lights was such that had they been on an airplane the airplane would have been huge or very close to the observers. And last, but not least, the man from the National Advisory Committee for Aeronautics was a very famous aerodynamicist and of such professional stature that if he said the lights weren't airplanes they weren't."

Hill's second personal UFO sighting, in 1962, was not reported to Blue Book, but is described in his book.

Hill was a strong proponent of the extraterrestrial hypothesis, which suggests that some UFOs represent structural craft of extraterrestrial origin. After retiring from NASA he developed his analysis with the aim of demonstrating that those UFOs that are not misidentifications of mundane objects or phenomena, have a coherent and consistent set of performance characteristics that are in line with what is allowable within physical theory. Hill presented his case within his book, Unconventional Flying Objects: A Scientific Analysis. The book was published posthumously, following a number of rejections from publishers during Hill's lifetime.

Unconventional Flying Objects was well received by the ufology community and is widely referenced by authors interested in UFOs.

== Interest in psychic phenomena ==
In an interview in 2000 Hill's daughter, Julie, described her father's interest in researching psychic phenomena:

"He spoke about a friend who was a psychic and experiments they did. He said he set up a pinwheel experiment – I don't know how, but he knew how to set up an experiment that would be valid – and he told me that for about a week he could turn it with his mind, with his thoughts, but after about a week he couldn't do it anymore. He also told me a story about being in a car parked on the street, he was into thought experiments, and he said he projected a thought into her mind to get into my car, and as the woman was walking by the car she stopped, opened the door and sat down and looked at him, and I don't know if she shrieked or what but she was absolutely stunned at what she was doing. He said, I willed her to get into the car, and she did. I think he was as shocked as she was. They were both shocked. He told me when I was in my late teens, and this was before Shirley Maclaine and astral projection, that when he slept, he could float out of his body at night and float on the ceiling and look down and watch himself sleep. He never said he went anywhere or saw fantastic things, just that he left his body and watched himself sleep".

None of these experiments were subject to peer review or published in any other way, however.
