= SpaceX CRS-8 =

2016 American spaceflight to the ISS

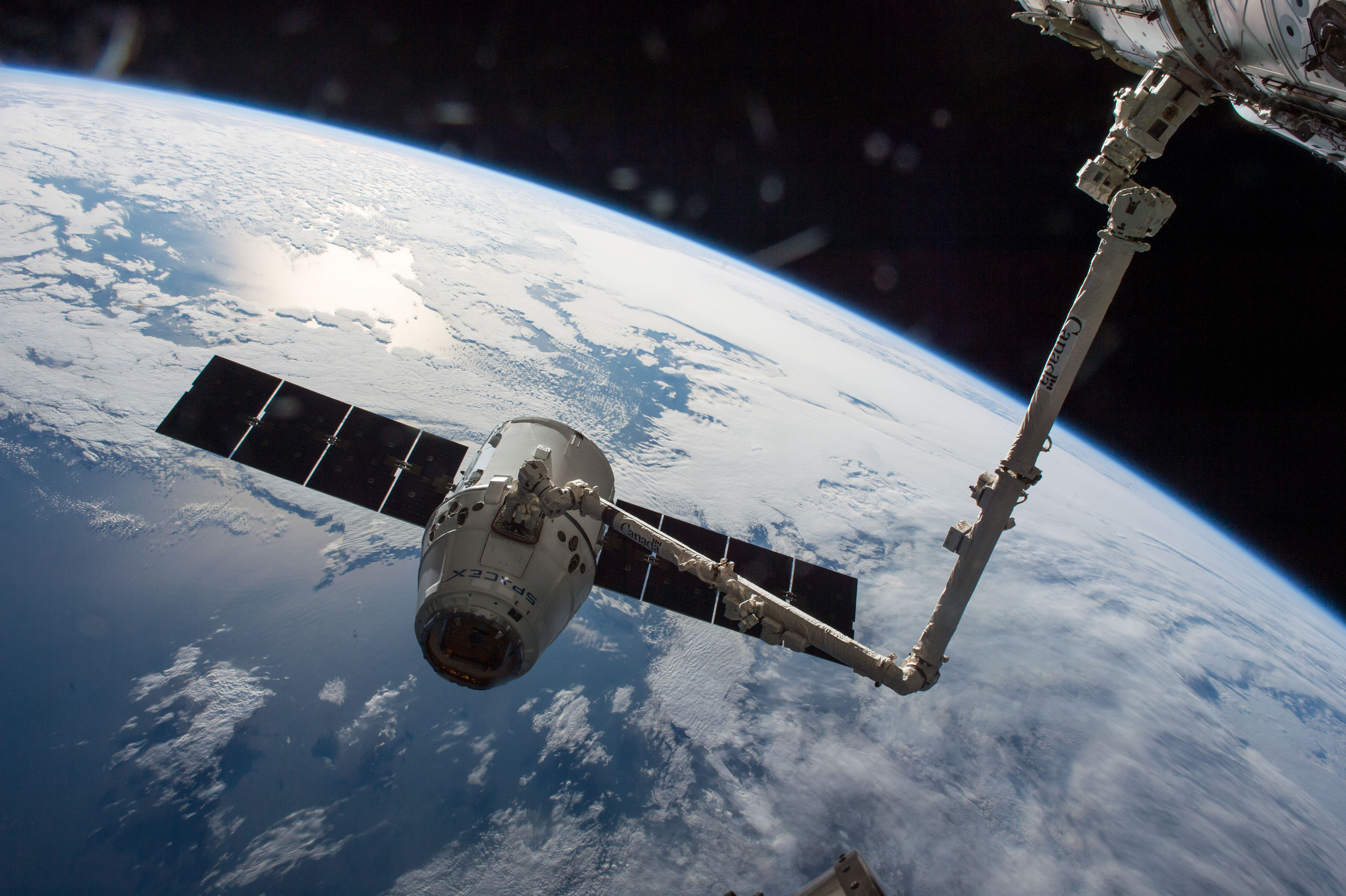
- The CRS-8 SpaceX Dragon captured by Canadarm on April 10, 2016
- Names: SpX-8
- Mission type: ISS resupply
- Operator: SpaceX
- COSPAR ID: 2016-024A
- SATCAT no.: 41452
- Mission duration: 32 days, 21 hours, 48 minutes

Spacecraft properties
- Spacecraft: Dragon 1 C110
- Spacecraft type: Dragon 1
- Manufacturer: SpaceX

Start of mission
- Launch date: April 8, 2016, 20:43 UTC
- Rocket: Falcon 9 Full Thrust (B1021)
- Launch site: Cape Canaveral, SLC-40
- Contractor: SpaceX

End of mission
- Disposal: Recovered
- Landing date: May 11, 2016, 18:31 UTC
- Landing site: Pacific Ocean

Orbital parameters
- Reference system: Geocentric
- Regime: Low Earth
- Periapsis altitude: 402 km (250 mi)
- Apoapsis altitude: 405 km (252 mi)
- Inclination: 51.64 degrees
- Period: 92.63 minutes
- Epoch: May 10, 2016, 13:19:38 UTC

Berthing at ISS
- Berthing port: Harmony nadir
- RMS capture: April 10, 2016, 11:23 UTC
- Berthing date: April 10, 2016, 13:57 UTC
- Unberthing date: May 11, 2016, 11:00 UTC
- RMS release: May 11, 2016, 13:19 UTC
- Time berthed: 30 days, 21 hours, 3 minutes

Cargo
- Mass: 3,136 kg (6,914 lb)
- Pressurised: 1,723 kg (3,799 lb)
- Unpressurised: 1,413 kg (3,115 lb)
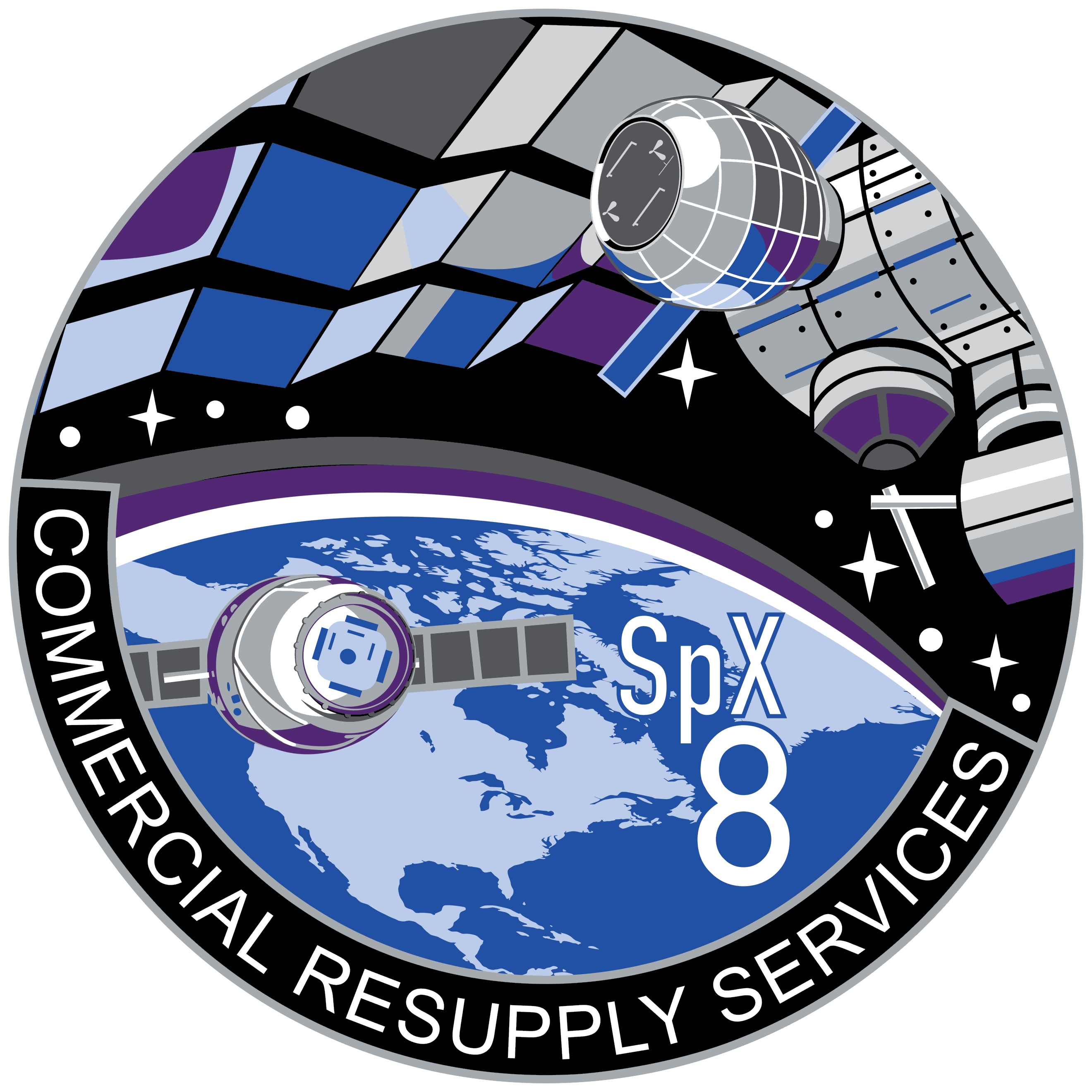
- NASA SpX-8 mission patch Commercial Resupply Services Cargo Dragon

SpaceX CRS-8, also known as SpX-8, was a Commercial Resupply Service mission to the International Space Station (ISS) which was launched on April 8, 2016, at 20:43 UTC. It was the 23rd flight of a Falcon 9 rocket, the tenth flight of a Dragon cargo spacecraft and the eighth operational mission contracted to SpaceX by NASA under the Commercial Resupply Services program. The capsule carried over 3,100 kilograms (6,800 lb) of cargo to the ISS including the Bigelow Expandable Activity Module (BEAM), a prototype inflatable space habitat delivered in the vehicle's trunk, which was attached to the station and, as of May 2022, is expected to remain so for five more full years of in-orbit viability tests.

After boosting the payload on its orbital trajectory, the rocket's first stage re-entered the denser layers of the atmosphere and landed vertically on the ocean landing platform Of Course I Still Love You nine minutes after liftoff.

The recovered Falcon 9 first stage (B1021) from this mission became the first one to be flown again, launching the SES-10 satellite on March 30, 2017.

== Launch schedule history ==
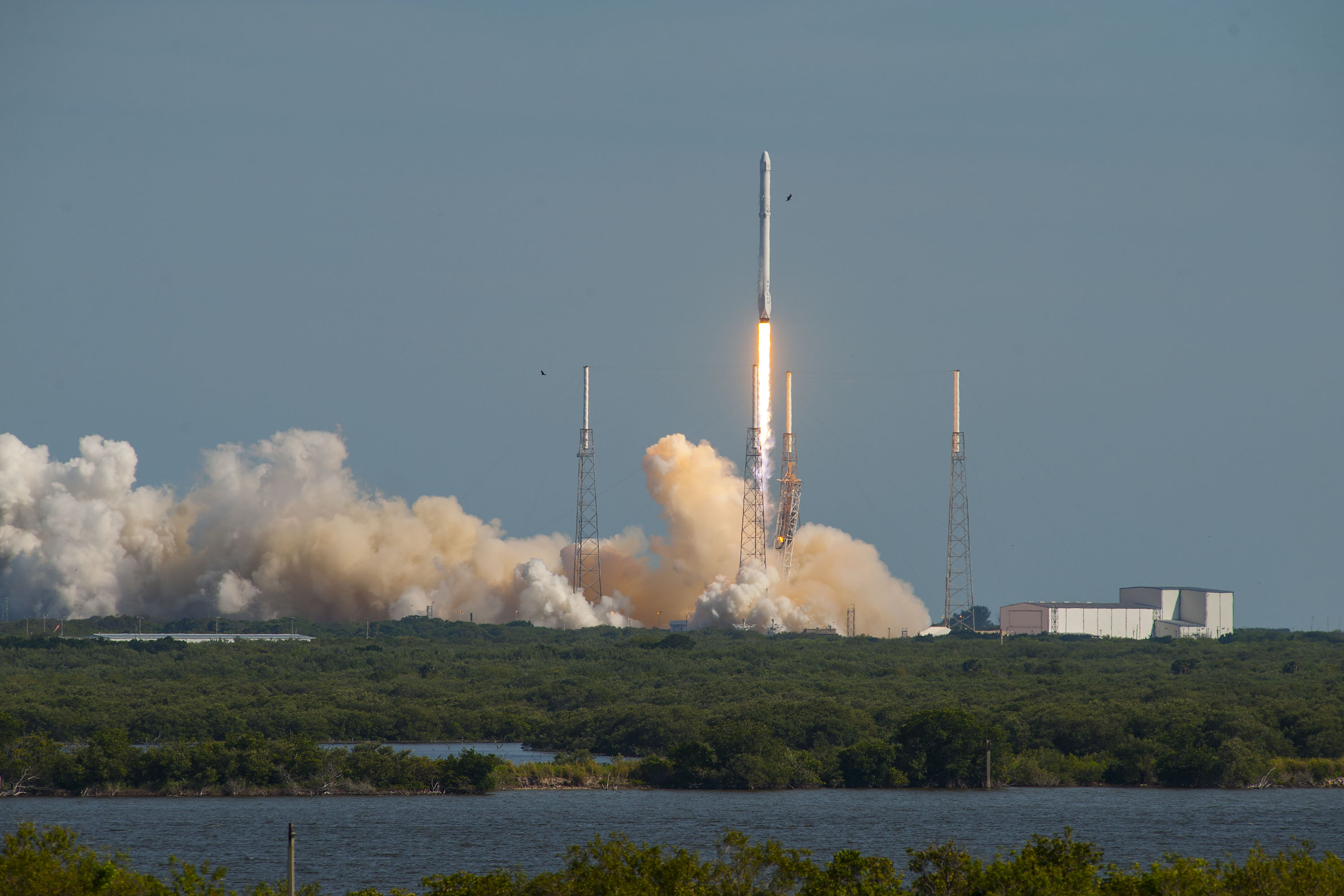
Falcon 9 lifting off from SLC-40 on April 8, 2016.

The launch was initially scheduled by NASA to occur no earlier than September 2, 2015. The launch date went under review pending the outcome of the analysis of the failure of the Falcon 9 launch vehicle in SpaceX CRS-7, a June 2015 flight. The return-to-flight (RTF) project included additional improvements.

With additional manifest changes announced by SpaceX in mid-October, CRS-8 was scheduled to be the third launch of the upgraded Falcon 9 Full Thrust rocket. By March 2016, the launch date was set to April 8, 2016, with a backup launch window the next day.

The spacecraft was finally launched on schedule, at 20:43 UTC on April 8, 2016. The rocket first stage separated around 2 minutes 40 seconds after liftoff, and the second stage separated around ten minutes 30 seconds after liftoff.

== Primary payload ==
NASA has contracted for the CRS-8 mission from SpaceX and therefore determines the orbital parameters for the primary payload – the Dragon space capsule.

The mission delivered 3,136 kilograms (6,914 lb) of supplies, experiments, and hardware to the ISS. These include the station's first expandable module, called the Bigelow Expandable Activity Module (BEAM), which is expected to remain on the station for at least five more full years of observation and testing. Also delivered in the Dragon were sixteen Flock 2d 3U CubeSats for the Earth-observing Flock constellation, built and operated by Planet Labs, which will be deployed by the NanoRacks CubeSat Deployer.

After splashdown, the mission returned more than 3,700 lb (1,700 kg) of cargo from the station back to Earth.

== First stage landing ==
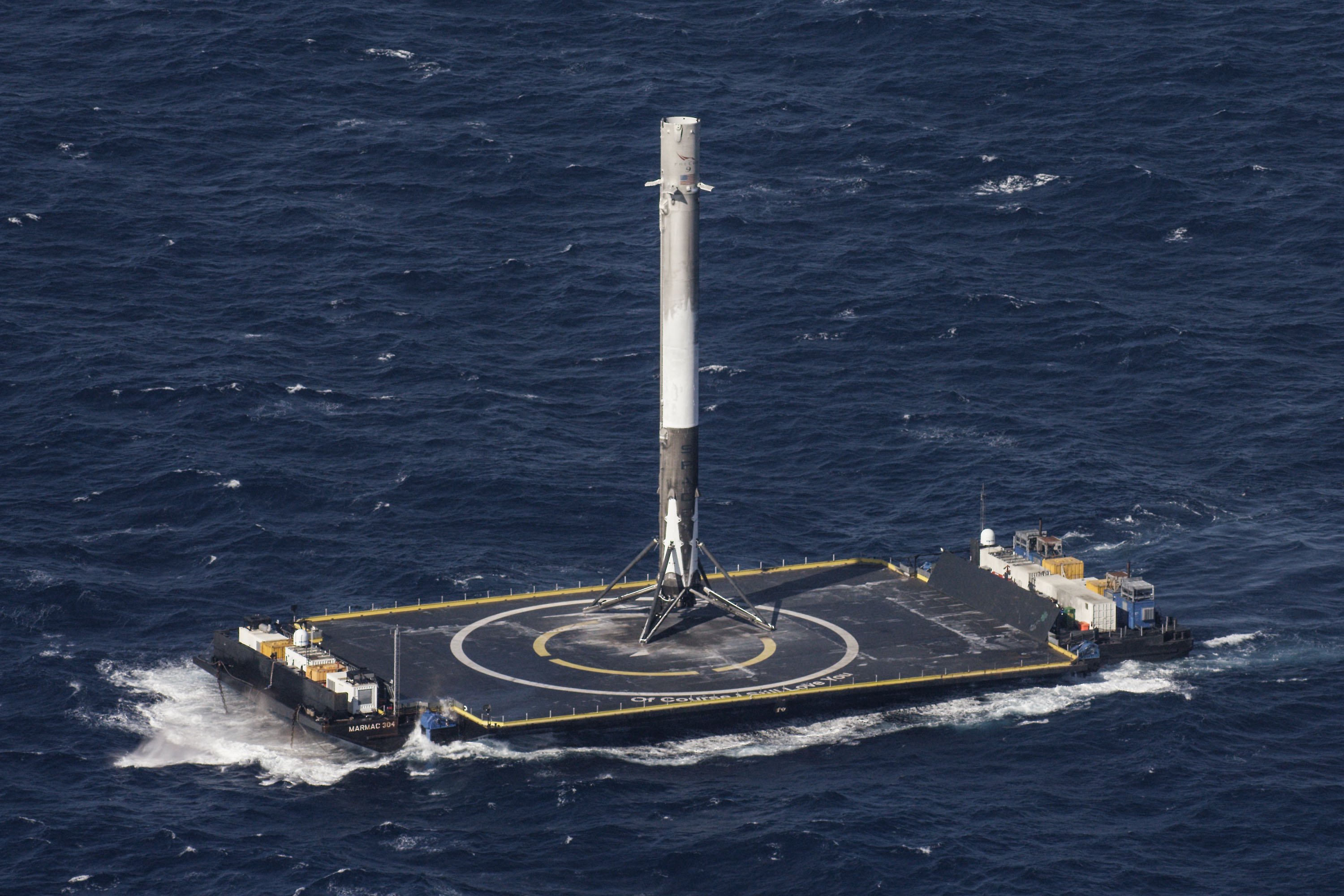
First stage of Falcon 9 Flight 23 landed on autonomous spaceport drone ship

After placing the CRS-8 cargo on its way to the International Space Station, the first stage of the Falcon 9 rocket conducted an experimental boostback and re-entry maneuver over the Atlantic Ocean. Nine minutes after liftoff, at 20:52:10 UTC, the booster landed vertically on the autonomous spaceport drone ship Of Course I Still Love You, 300 kilometers (190 mi) from the Florida coastline, achieving a long-sought-after milestone for the SpaceX reusable launch system development program.

This was the second successful landing achieved by a SpaceX orbital launch vehicle and the first vertical landing by any organization on a floating platform. SpaceX first landed a Falcon 9 on solid ground at Cape Canaveral with flight 20 on December 22, 2015.

=== Port arrival ===
The drone ship carried the stage to Port Canaveral, Florida, arriving on April 12, 2016 (UTC), where it was offloaded. SpaceX plans to keep this first stage in Cape Canaveral and conduct a series of test fires to ensure that the vehicle is ready for a future operational mission. According to SpaceX CEO Elon Musk, the rocket will likely be test-fired at Kennedy Space Center Launch Complex 39. Musk noted that assuming the test fires went well, the stage would likely be reflown for a mission in June 2016.

=== First stage reflight ===
The first stage of the CRS-8 launch was selected to be reflown first, in early 2017. Additional tests were conducted prior to SpaceX certifying the stage's suitability for reuse on subsequent launch. On January 31, 2017, SpaceX posted a photo of a static fire test of this stage in Texas. It was launched again on March 30, 2017, as part of Falcon 9 Flight 32 carrying the SES-10 communications satellite. The stage was also recovered a second time after landing on the drone ship Of Course I Still Love You.

As part of a multi-month multi-vehicle test process to reuse Falcon 9 boosters, another first stage — from flight 24 which carried JCSAT-14 — was designated a "reference vehicle" for further testing, because it encountered "extreme temperatures during its reentry into Earth atmosphere" in May 2016 from a more energetic GTO trajectory. This booster underwent a series of tests, including a 150-second full-duration engine firing which was completed on July 28, 2016.

== Gallery ==
SpaceX CRS-8
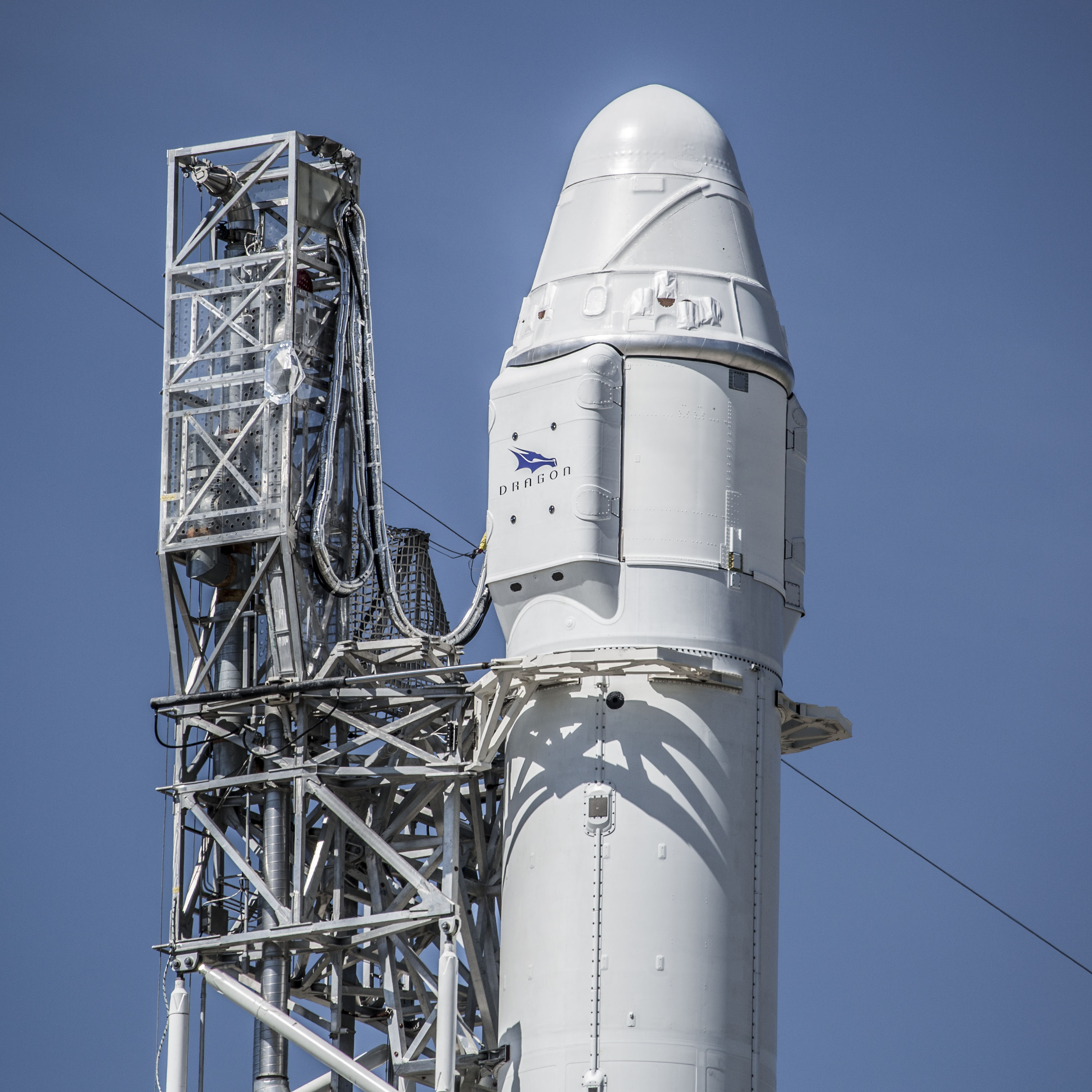
CRS-8 on the pad

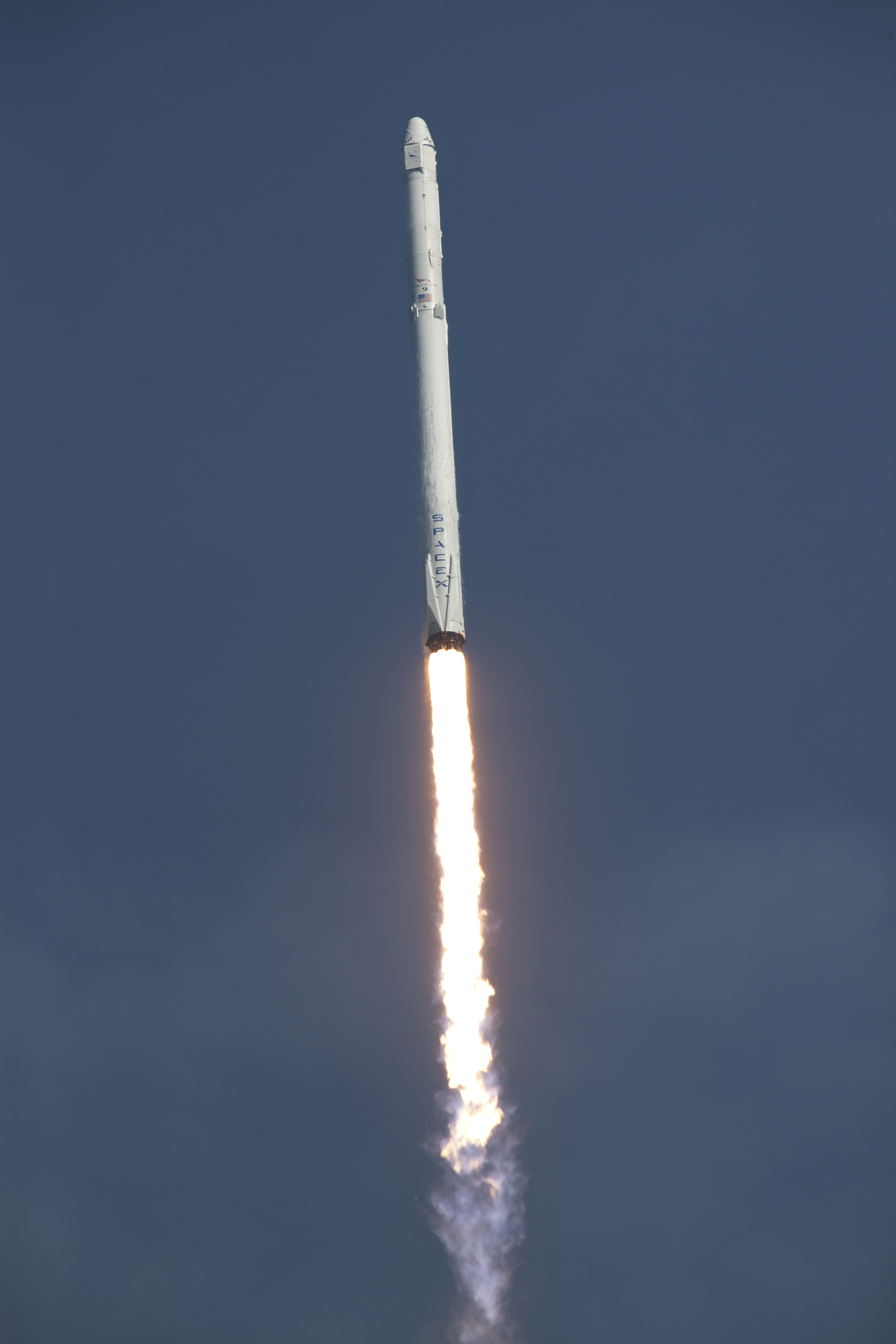
Launch of CRS-8

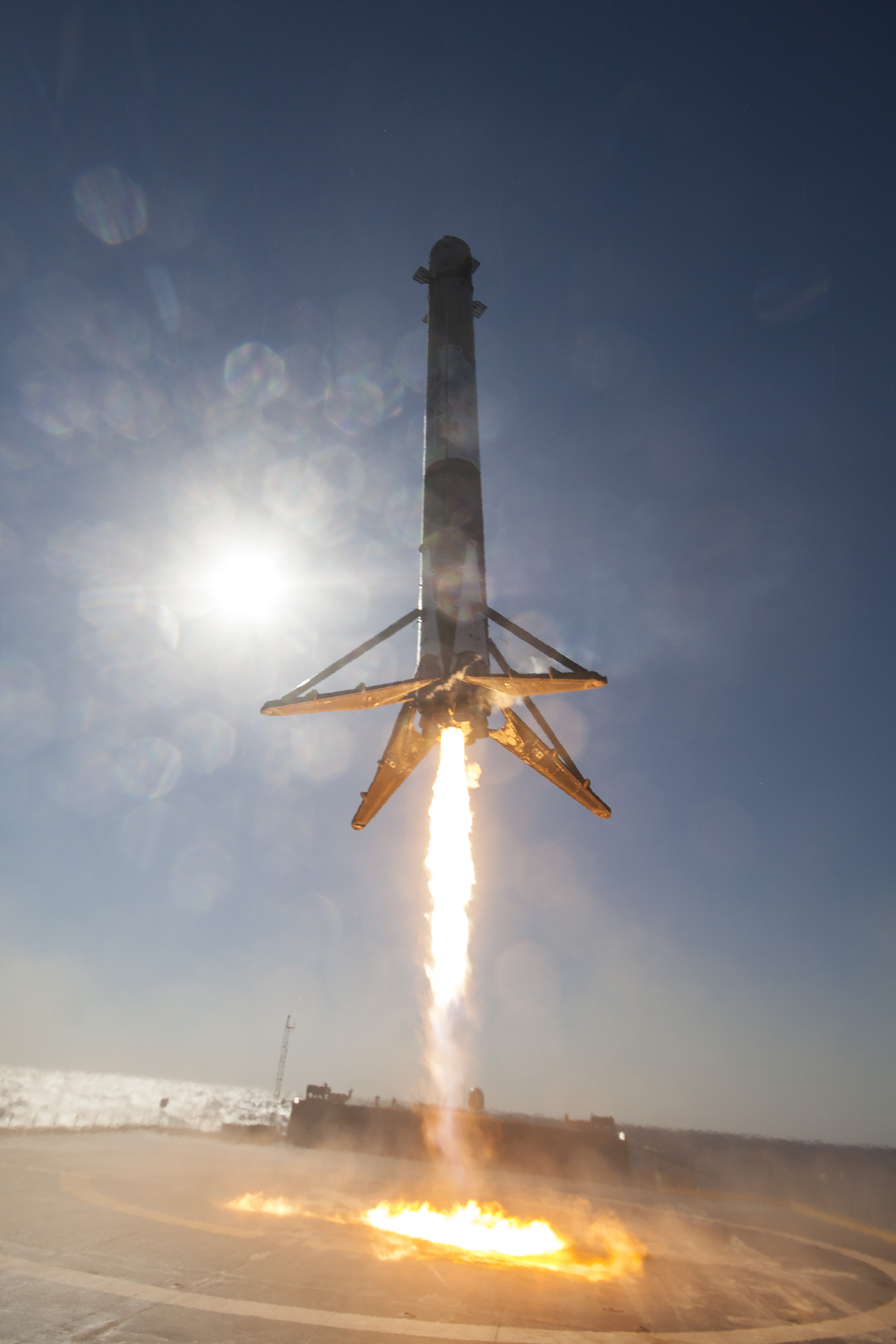
Falcon 9 lands on Of Course I Still Love You

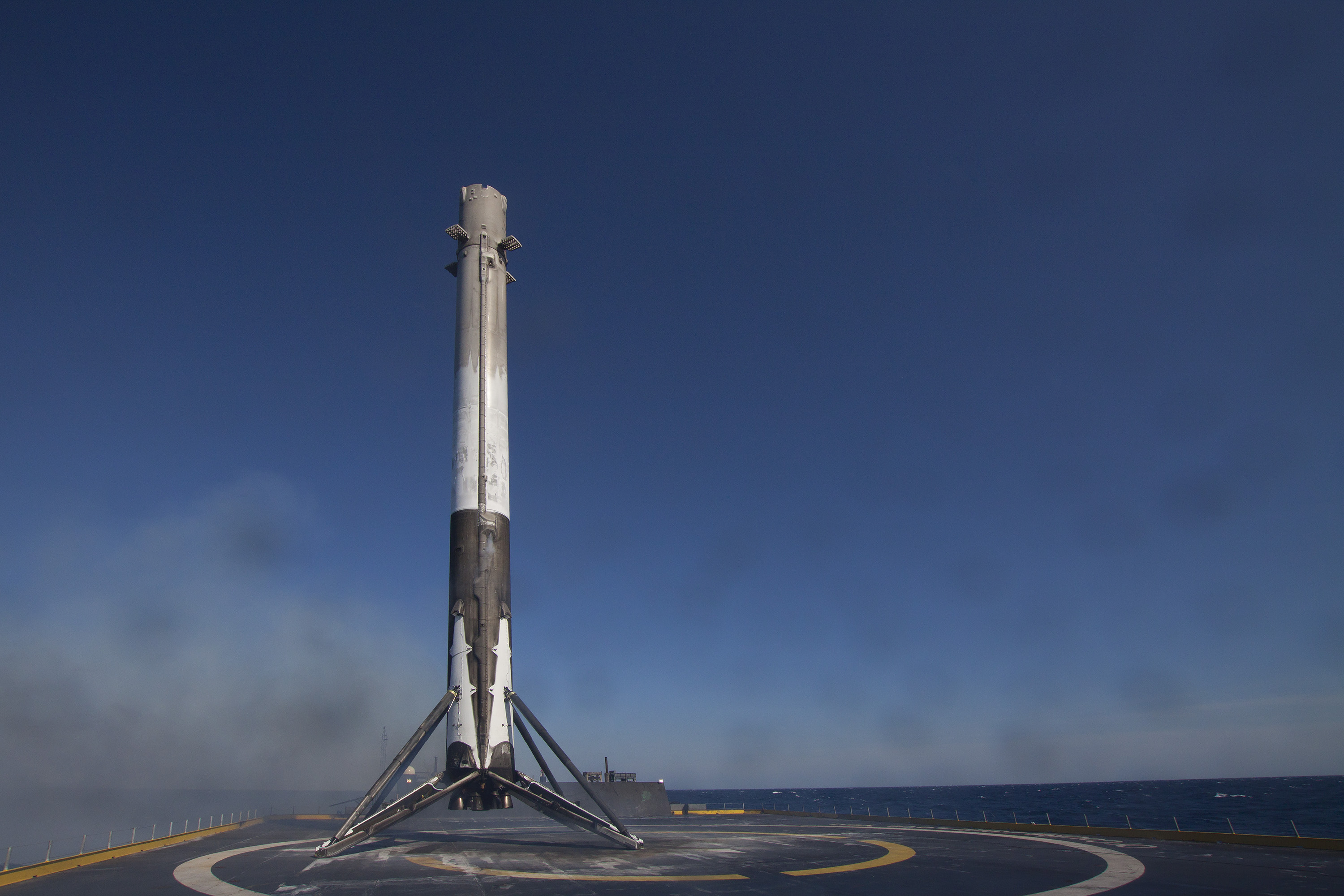
Falcon 9 after landing

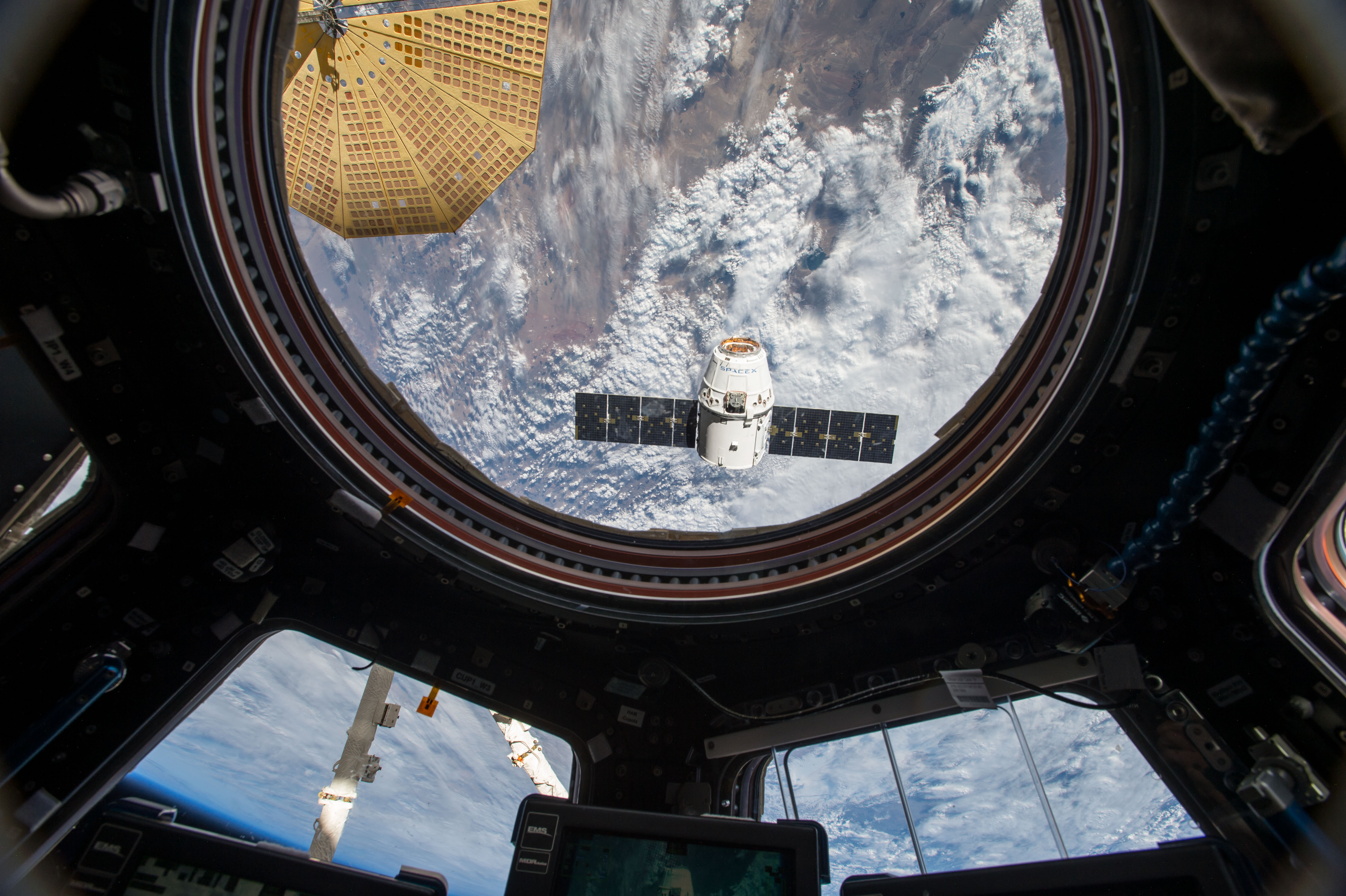
Dragon seen from the ISS cupola

== See also ==
- List of Falcon 9 launches
