= Clarence Otis Bigelow =

American pharmacist (1851–1937)

- Bigelow pictured around 1920
- Born: November 29, 1851; Warwick, Rhode Island, U.S.
- Died: March 28, 1937 (aged 85); New York City, New York, U.S.
- Resting place: Rosedale Cemetery, Orange, New Jersey, U.S.
- Occupation: Pharmacist
- Known for: Founding C.O. Bigelow

Clarence Otis Bigelow (November 29, 1851 – March 28, 1937) was an American pharmacist and banker. He founded C. O. Bigelow Apothecaries on Sixth Avenue in New York City. Today, it is the oldest apothecary–pharmacy in the United States.

== Early life ==
Bigelow was born in 1851 in Warwick, Rhode Island, to William Marlin Bigelow and Margaret Catherine Dye. His father died aged 41, before Clarence was born.

== Career ==
Bigelow began his pharmaceutical career with Messrs. Frost and Dickinson in Springfield, Massachusetts, but left in 1867, "while still a mere boy", for New York City. He began working for George L. Hooper at his Village Apothecary Shop pharmacy, founded in 1838 by Dr. Galen Hunter, at 104 Sixth Avenue (today, number 414).

In 1880, Bigelow purchased the business from Hooper and renamed it C. O. Bigelow Apothecaries. In 1904, he moved the business to 106–108 Sixth Avenue, two doors to the north of its original location, and expanded it twice over the next forty years. By 1900, he had a staff of fifteen, including seven registered pharmacists. His chief clerk remained with the business from its founding until at least the turn of the century, a period of twenty years. In 1900, he put his success down to two factors: keeping his capital invested in his company, and employing the best people as clerks and assistants.

In 1924, Bigelow unveiled inside the store's main entrance a large bronze tablet commemorating the 85th anniversary of the incorporation of the business.

== Personal life ==
Bigelow married New Jersey native Grace Frances Bird, daughter of Thomas H. Bird, one of the founders of the New York Stock Exchange. She died on October 18, 1916, of heart disease. She was 62. The couple had one child, a daughter, who married Walter B. Simpson.

He became the president of the New York State Board of Pharmacy and treasurer of Columbia University's Department of Pharmacy from 1882, and was also president of the West Side Savings Bank. He belonged to the Sons of the American Revolution.

In 1911, twenty-one years after moving to New York's Upper West Side, he became a founding member of Ye Olde Settler's Association of Ye West Side. He was living at 133 West 78th Street, but also owned a summer home in Allenhurst, New Jersey.

== Death ==
Bigelow died at St. Luke's Hospital in Manhattan in 1937, aged 85. His funeral was held on March 30, 1937, at the Rutgers Presbyterian Church, of which he was the president of the board of trustees. He was interred in Rosedale Cemetery in Orange, New Jersey, beside his wife.
