= Bigelow School =

Bigelow School may refer to:

- Bigelow Middle School (Newton Corner, Massachusetts)
- Bigelow School (Boston, Massachusetts), listed on the National Register of Historic Places in Suffolk County, Massachusetts
- Bigelow School (Mequon, Wisconsin), listed on the National Register of Historic Places in Ozaukee County, Wisconsin
