= Bigelow (surname) =

Bigelow is a surname. Notable people with the surname include:

- Abijah Bigelow (1775–1860), United States Representative from Massachusetts
- Albert Bigelow (1906–1993), former United States Navy officer turned peace activist and Quaker
- Bob Bigelow (1953–2020), retired National Basketball Association player
- Charles A. Bigelow (1862–1912), American actor
- Charles Bigelow (type designer) (born 1945), American type historian, professor, and designer
- Clarence Otis Bigelow (1851-1937), American pharmacist and banker, founder of C. O. Bigelow Apothecaries
- Daniel Bigelow (1824–1905), American lawyer and politician
- Doug Bigelow (1928–1996), Australian rules footballer with Essendon Football Club
- Edward Manning Bigelow (1850–1916), Pittsburgh City Engineer, Director of Public Works and "father of Pittsburgh's parks"
- Ella A. Bigelow (1849–1917), American author and clubwoman
- Elliot Bigelow (1897–1933), Major League Baseball player
- Elmer Charles Bigelow (1920–1945), posthumous recipient of the United States Medal of Honor
- Erastus Brigham Bigelow (1814–1879), American inventor of weaving machines
- Frank Bigelow (born 1954), American politician. Served in the California State Assembly from 2012 to 2022
- Frank Hagar Bigelow (1851–1924), United States astronomer and meteorologist
- Frederick Ellsworth Bigelow (1873–1929), American bandmaster and composer
- George Tyler Bigelow (1810–1878), chief justice of the Massachusetts Supreme Judicial Court
- Harry Bigelow (1874–1950), American lawyer and big-game hunter
- Henry Bryant Bigelow (1879–1967), American oceanographer and marine biologist
- Henry Jacob Bigelow (1818–1890), American surgeon and Harvard University professor
- Herbert S. Bigelow (1870–1951), United States Representative from Ohio
- Hobart B. Bigelow (1834–1891), American politician and 50th Governor of Connecticut
- Horace Bigelow (1898–1980), American chess master and organizer
- Howard E. Bigelow (1923–1987), American mycologist
- Iva Bigelow (later Iva Bigelow Weaver; 1875–1932), American singer
- Jacob Bigelow (1787–1879), American physician, botanist, architect and professor
- John Bigelow (1817–1911), American lawyer
- John Bigelow Jr. (1854–1936), United States Army officer and son of John Bigelow
- John Milton Bigelow (1804–1878), American physician and botanist
- John P. Bigelow (1797–1872), mayor of Boston, Secretary of State of Massachusetts and member of the Massachusetts House of Representatives
- Julian Bigelow (1913–2003), American pioneering computer engineer
- Kathryn Bigelow (born 1951), American film director
- Lettie S. Bigelow (1848/49 – 1906), American author
- Lewis Bigelow (1785–1838), United States Representative from Massachusetts
- Lisa Jenn Bigelow, American writer of children's books and young adult novels
- Lucius A. Bigelow (1892–1973), American chemistry professor
- Poultney Bigelow (1855–1954), American journalist and author
- Melville M. Bigelow (1846–1921), American legal academic
- Rensselaer R. Bigelow (1848–1907), justice of the Supreme Court of Nevada
- Robert Bigelow (born 1945), hotel magnate
- Rolla Bigelow (1878–1952), American banker
- Scott Bam Bam Bigelow (1961–2007), American professional wrestler
- Stephen Bigelow, Australian mathematician and professor of mathematics at the University of California, Santa Barbara
- Timothy Bigelow (soldier) (1739–1790), Continental Army colonel in the American Revolutionary War
- Timothy Bigelow (lawyer) (1767–1821), Speaker of the Massachusetts House of Representatives
- Tim Bigelow (born 1978 or 1979), American rapper
- Tom Bigelow (born 1939), former racing driver
- Wilfred Gordon Bigelow (1913–2005), Canadian surgeon known for his role in developing the artificial pacemaker
- William Sturgis Bigelow (1850–1926), American physician and collector of Japanese art
