= Bigelow School (Mequon, Wisconsin) =

- U.S. National Register of Historic Places
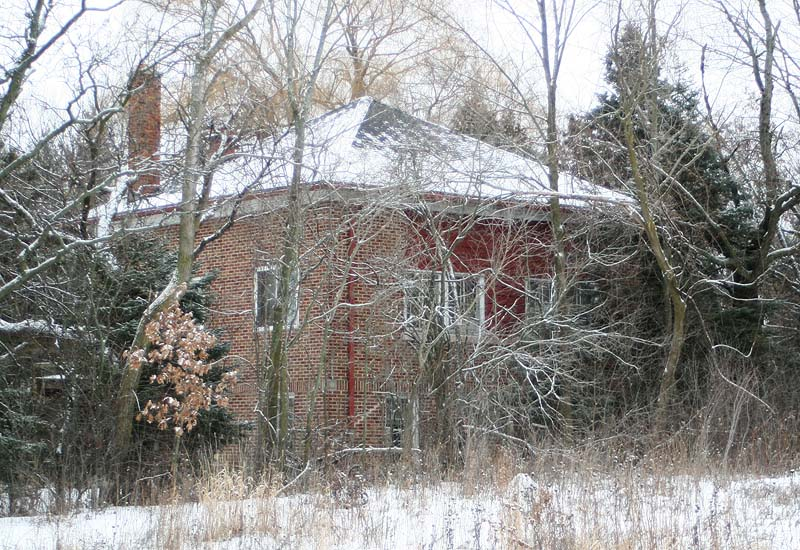

- Location within Wisconsin Location within the United States
- Location: 4228 W. Bonniwell Rd., Mequon, Wisconsin
- Coordinates: 43°15′57″N 87°57′42″W
- Area: 4.8 acres (1.9 ha)
- Built: 1929
- Architect: Redden, William J.
- Architectural style: Classical Revival
- NRHP reference No.: 00000851
- Added to NRHP: July 27, 2000

The Bigelow School is a historic former school located at 4228 W. Bonniwell Rd. in Mequon, Wisconsin. The one-story red brick school was built in 1929; it was one of the last schools built in Mequon and is one of many extant school buildings from the late 19th and early 20th centuries in the city. Designed by William J. Redden, the school's architecture utilizes the Classical Revival and Prairie School styles and features a hipped roof, flaring eaves, and a front entry decorated with a brick surround and a stone keystone and plaque. The school closed in the 1960s due to school consolidation.

The Bigelow School was added to the National Register of Historic Places on July 27, 2000.
