= Galen Hunter =

American pharmacist (1802–1872)

- Born: January 20, 1802; Westmore, Vermont, U.S.
- Died: August 6, 1872 (aged 70); New York City, New York, U.S.
- Resting place: Cypress Hills Cemetery, Brooklyn, U.S.
- Occupation: Physician
- Known for: Founder of The Village Apothecary Shop

Galen Hunter, M.D. (January 20, 1802 – August 6, 1872) was an American pharmacist. He founded The Village Apothecary Shop on Sixth Avenue in New York City. Today, as C.O. Bigelow, it is the oldest apothecary–pharmacy in the United States.

== Early life ==
Hunter was born in Westmore, Vermont, to Jabesh Hunter and Mary Savage. He graduated Dartmouth College in Hanover, New Hampshire, in 1824.

== Career ==
In 1838, Hunter established The Village Apothecary Shop at 102 Sixth Avenue in New York City. He ran the business until 1863, at which point it was sold to George L. Hooper, a native of Castine, Maine.

He was a member of the Medical Society of the County of New York between 1841 and his death.

== Personal life ==
On January 27, 1827, in Springfield, Vermont, Hunter married Elizabeth Rosalind Willard (1807–1852), of Burke, Vermont. They had three known children: Dr. William Charles, who was born in 1829; Helen Elizabeth, born in White River Junction, Vermont, on June 6, 1836; and George Olcutt.

== Death ==
Hunter died on August 6, 1872, aged 70. He is interred in Brooklyn's Cypress Hills Cemetery. He survived his wife by twenty years.
