= Bigelow Expandable Activity Module =

Experimental inflatable module – Installed on ISS

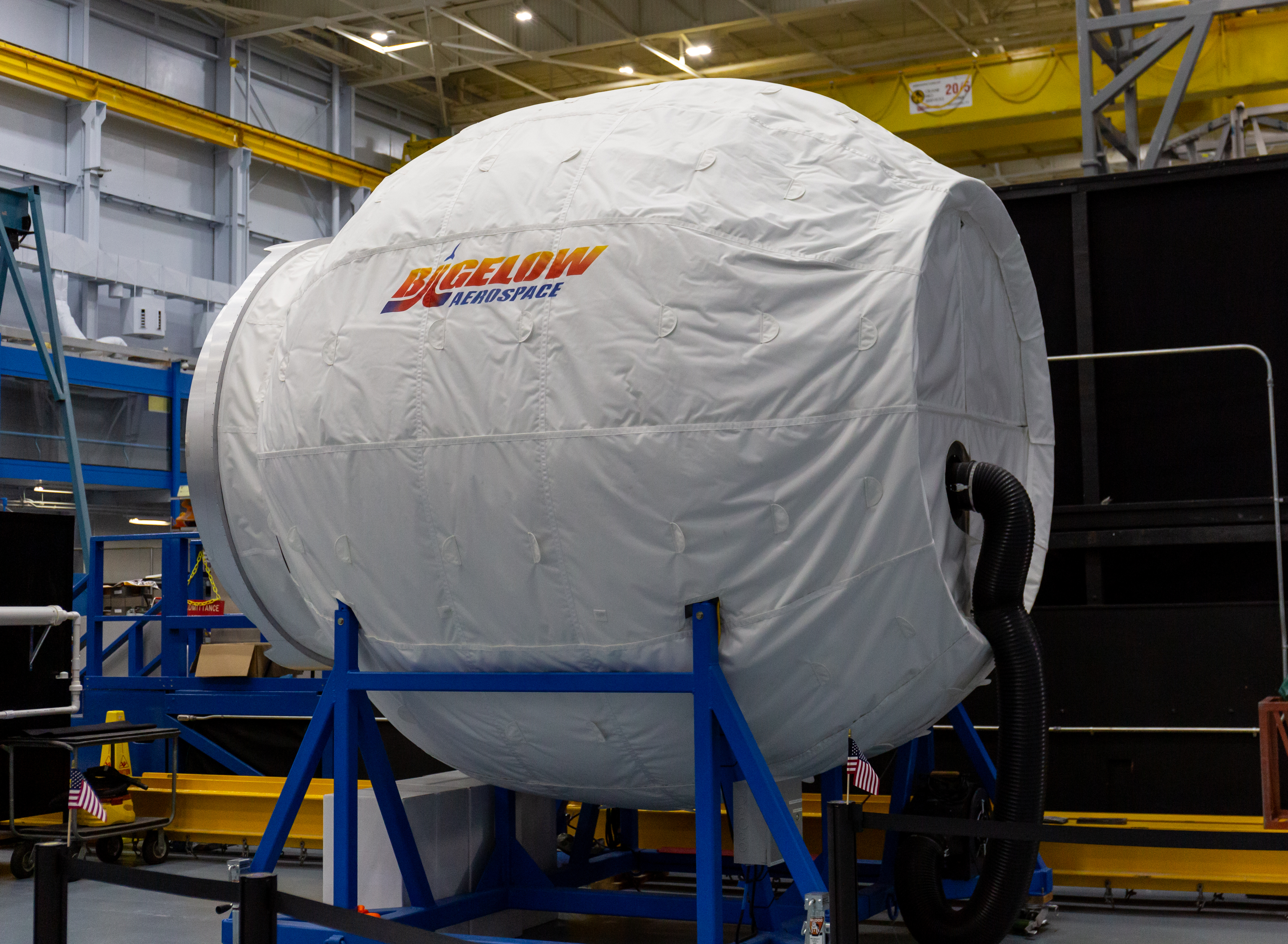
- Full-scale mock-up of BEAM at Johnson Space Center

Module statistics
- COSPAR ID: 2016-024A
- Launch date: April 8, 2016, 20:43:31 UTC
- Launch vehicle: Falcon 9 Full Thrust (SpaceX CRS-8)
- Berthed: April 16, 2016, 09:36 UTC; Tranquility aft
- Mass: 1,413 kg (3,115 lb)
- Length: 4.01 m (13.2 ft)
- Diameter: 3.23 m (10.6 ft)
- Pressurised volume: 16.0 m^{3} (570 cu ft)

The Bigelow Expandable Activity Module (BEAM) is an experimental expandable space station module developed by Bigelow Aerospace under contract with NASA. It was designed for testing as a temporary module on the International Space Station (ISS) beginning in 2016. BEAM arrived at the ISS on April 10, 2016, was berthed to the station on April 16, and was expanded and pressurized on May 28. Originally planned as a two-year test, the module has exceeded expectations and as of 2026, remains in use for additional cargo storage. Following Bigelow Aerospace's suspension of business operations in 2020, ownership of BEAM transferred to NASA.

== History ==
NASA originally considered the idea of inflatable habitats in the 1960s with the Erectable Torus Manned Space Laboratory, and developed the TransHab inflatable module concept in the late 1990s. The TransHab project was canceled by Congress in 2000, and Bigelow Aerospace purchased the rights to the patents developed by NASA to pursue private space station designs. In 2006 and 2007, Bigelow launched two demonstration modules to Earth orbit, Genesis I and Genesis II.

NASA re-initiated analysis of expandable module technology for a variety of potential missions beginning in early 2010. Various options were considered, including procurement from commercial provider Bigelow Aerospace, for providing what in 2010 was proposed to be a torus-shaped storage module for the International Space Station. One application of the toroidal BEAM design was as a centrifuge demo preceding further developments of the NASA Nautilus-X multi-mission exploration concept vehicle. In January 2011, Bigelow projected that the BEAM module could be built and made flight-ready 24 months after a build contract was secured.

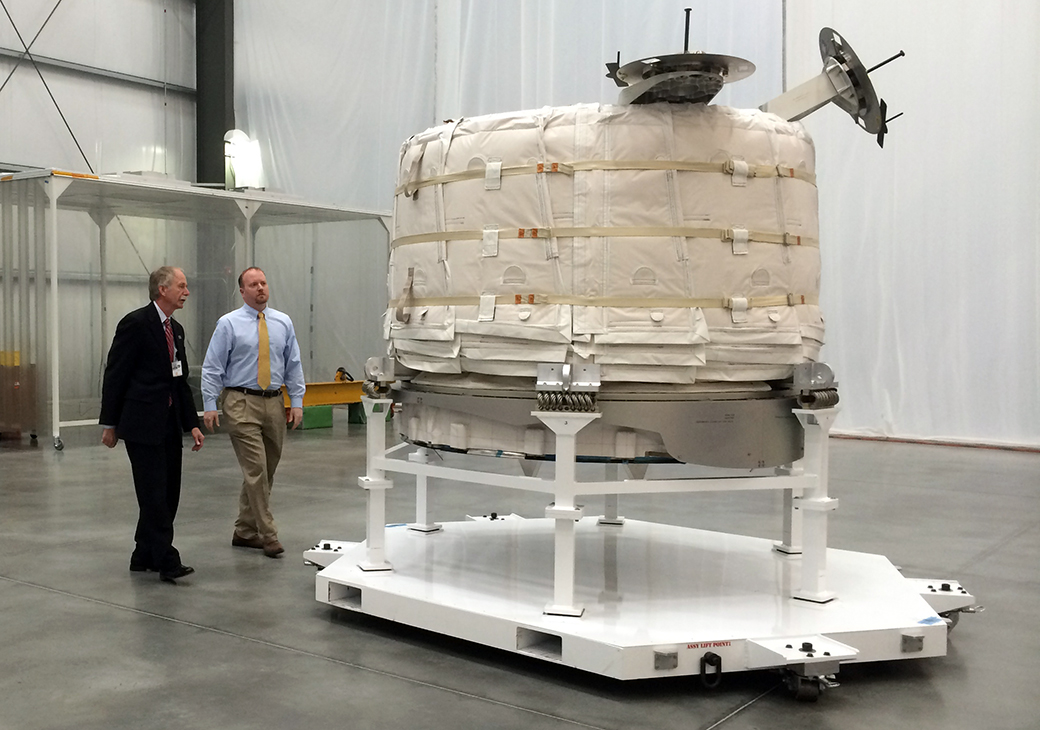
Completed BEAM flight unit at the Bigelow Aerospace facility in North Las Vegas, Nevada

On December 20, 2012, NASA awarded Bigelow Aerospace a US$17.8 million contract to construct the Bigelow Expandable Activity Module (BEAM) under NASA's Advanced Exploration Systems (AES) Program. Sierra Nevada Corporation built the US$2 million Common Berthing Mechanism under a 16-month firm-fixed-price contract awarded in May 2013. NASA plans made public in mid-2013 called for a 2015 delivery of the module to the ISS.

In 2013, it was planned that at the end of BEAM's mission, it would be removed from the ISS and burn up during reentry.

During a press event on March 12, 2015, at the Bigelow Aerospace facility in North Las Vegas, Nevada, the completed ISS flight unit, compacted and with two Canadarm2 grapple fixtures attached, was displayed for the media.

In December 2021, Bigelow transferred ownership of BEAM to NASA's Johnson Space Center. With the cessation of Bigelow Aerospace activities, NASA contracted ATA Engineering, a former Bigelow subcontractor, for engineering support on the BEAM.

== Deployment and status ==
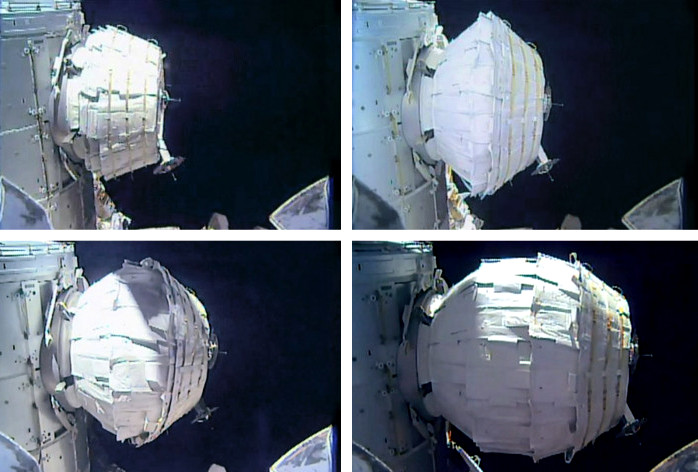
Progression of expansion of BEAM

In early 2015, BEAM was scheduled for deployment on the next available ISS transport vehicle, SpaceX CRS-8, which was scheduled for launch in September 2015. Due to a rocket failure during the SpaceX CRS-7 launch in June 2015, the delivery of BEAM was delayed. The successful launch of SpaceX CRS-8 took place on April 8, 2016, and the Dragon cargo vehicle was berthed to the nadir port of Harmony node on April 10, 2016. On April 16, 2016, British astronaut Tim Peake extracted BEAM from Dragon's trunk using Canadarm2, and installed it on the aft port of Tranquility node.

The first attempt at module inflation took place on May 26, 2016, and was suspended after higher-than-expected air pressure inside BEAM was detected with minimal expansion of the module. The attempt was terminated after two hours. The failure to expand and unfold may be the result of the unanticipated 10-month delay in module inflation, which may have caused the fabric layers to stick together. The module was expanded on May 28, 2016, over the course of seven hours, with air being injected 25 times for a total of 2 minutes 27 seconds. Its length was extended 170 cm (67 in) from its stowed configuration, 2.5 cm (0.98 in) less than expected. After expansion was complete, air tanks aboard BEAM were opened to equalize air pressure in the module with that of the ISS. The module was originally to be monitored for two years.

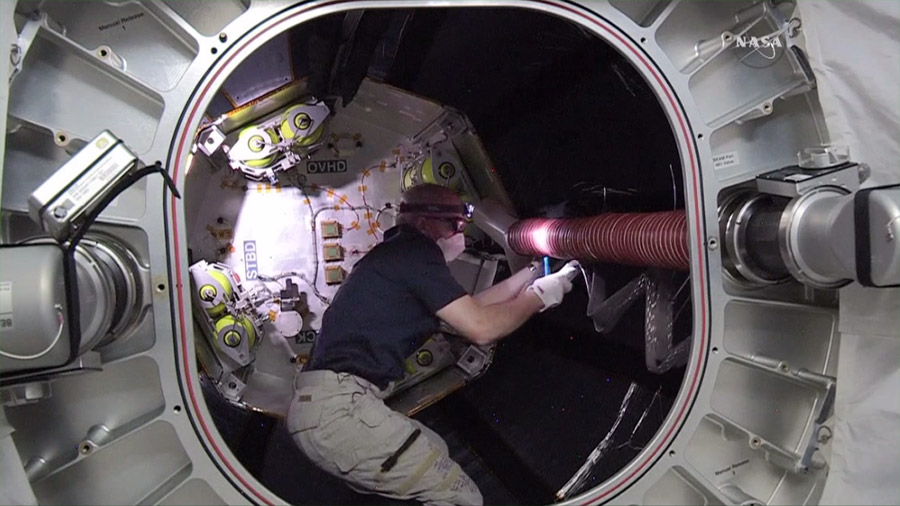
Jeff Williams inside BEAM during early tests

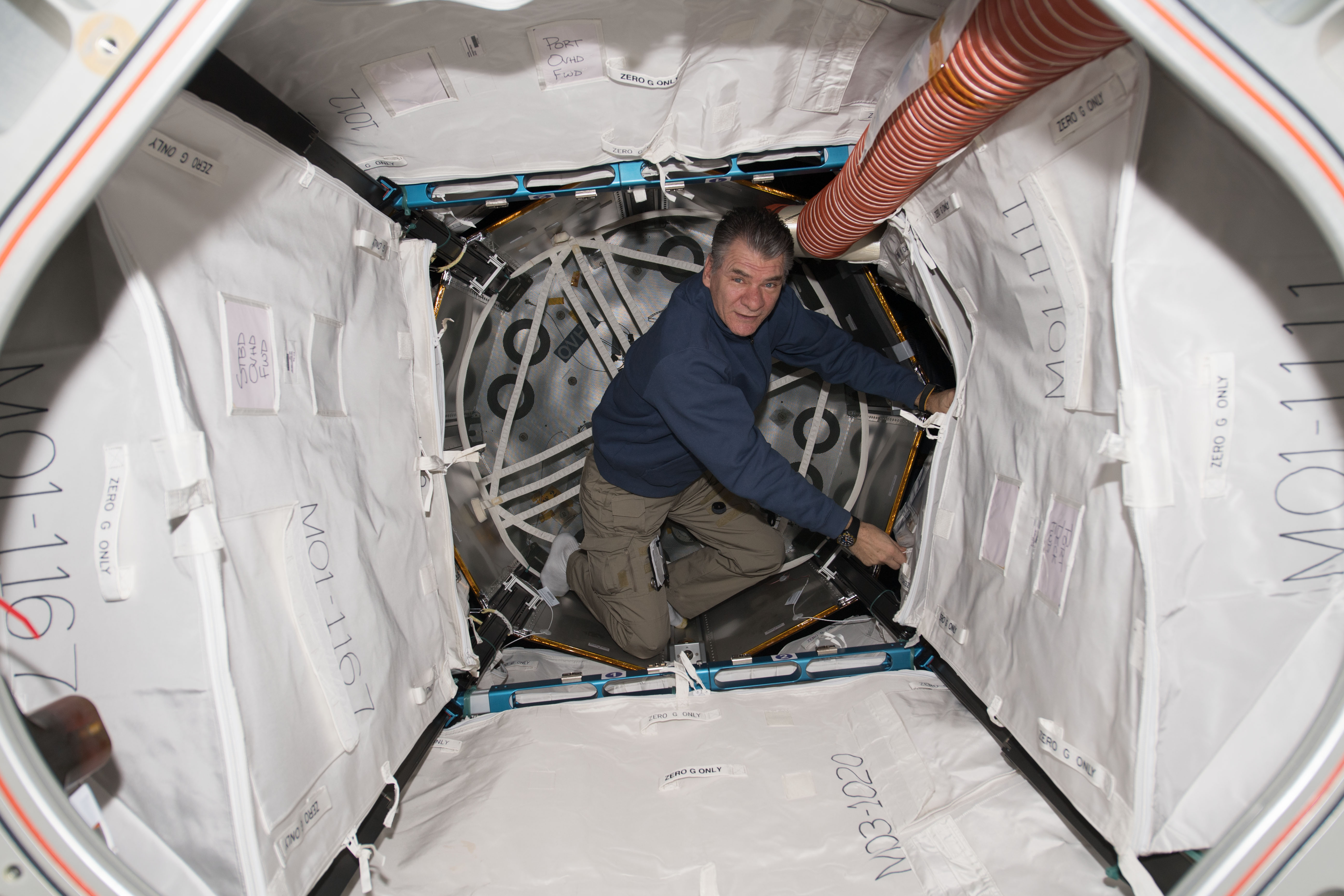
ESA astronaut Paolo Nespoli inside BEAM, outfitted with cargo storage bins

On June 6, 2016, astronaut Jeff Williams and cosmonaut Oleg Skripochka opened the hatch to BEAM and entered to collect an air sample, download expansion data from sensors, and install monitoring equipment. The hatch to BEAM was re-sealed on June 8, 2016, after three days of tests. A second round of tests took place on September 29, 2016, when astronaut Kathleen Rubins entered the module to install temporary monitoring equipment.

NASA noted in May 2017 that, after spending one year in space, the BEAM instrumentation had recorded "a few probable micrometeoroid debris impacts" but that the module's protective layers had resisted penetration. Early results from monitors inside the module have shown that galactic cosmic radiation levels are comparable to those in the rest of the space station. Further testing will try to characterize whether the inflatable structure is any more resilient to radiation than traditional metal modules.

In October 2017, it was announced that the module would stay attached to the ISS until 2020, with options for two further one-year extensions. The module will be used to store up to 130 cargo transfer bags to make available space aboard the station. The ISS crew began work in November 2017 to prepare BEAM for use as storage space.

In July 2019, an engineering assessment certified BEAM's ability to remain attached to the station until 2028, as it has exceeded performance expectations and become a core cargo storage module on the volume-constrained station. A contract extension will be required to allow BEAM to serve its extended operational lifetime.

With the suspension of all activities at Bigelow Aerospace, development on BEAM has ended. Engineering support passed to Bigelow subcontractor ATA Engineering in 2022, who will not continue development.

== Objectives ==
The BEAM is an experimental program in an effort to test and validate expandable habitat technology. If BEAM performs favorably, it could lead to development of expandable habitation structures for future crews traveling in deep space. The two-year demonstration period will:

- Demonstrate launch and deployment of a commercial inflatable module. Implement folding and packaging techniques for inflatable shell. Implement a venting system for inflatable shell during ascent to ISS.
- Determine radiation protection capability of inflatable structures.
- Demonstrate design performance of commercial inflatable structure like thermal, structural, mechanical durability, long term leak performance, etc.
- Demonstrate safe deployment and operation of an inflatable structure in a flight mission.

== Characteristics ==
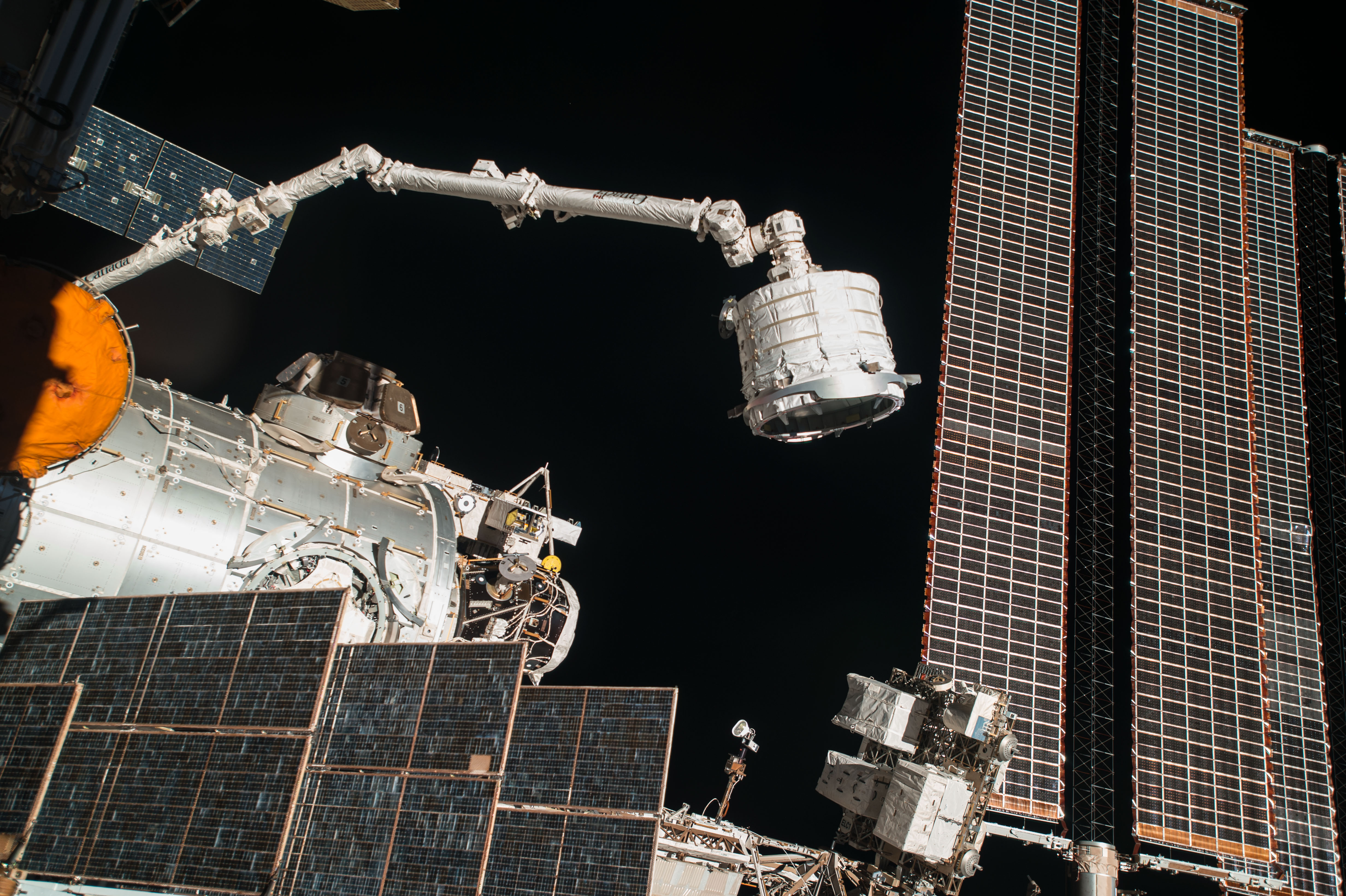
BEAM being moved to the aft port of Tranquility in April 2016

BEAM is composed of two metal bulkheads, an aluminium structure, and multiple layers of soft fabric with spacing between layers, protecting an internal restraint and bladder system; it has neither windows nor internal power. The module was expanded about a month after being attached by its Common Berthing Mechanism to the space station. It was inflated from its packed dimensions of 2.16 m (7 ft 1 in) long and 2.36 m (7 ft 9 in) in diameter to its pressurized dimensions of 4.01 m (13.2 ft) long and 3.23 m (10.6 ft) in diameter. The module has a mass of 1,413 kg (3,115 lb), and its interior pressure is 101.3 kPa (14.69 psi), the same as inside of the ISS.

BEAM's internal dimensions provide 16.0 m^{3} (570 cu ft) of volume where a crew member will enter the module three to four times per year to collect sensor data, perform microbial surface sampling, conduct periodic change-out of the radiation area monitors, and inspect the general condition of the module. The hatch to the module will otherwise remain closed. Its interior is described as being "a large closet with padded white walls", with various equipment and sensors attached to two central supports.

=== Radiation shielding ===
The flexible Kevlar-like materials of construction are proprietary. The multiple layers of flexible fabric and closed-cell vinyl polymer foam in the BEAM structural shell are expected to provide impact protection (see Whipple shield) as well as radiation protection, but model calculations need to be validated by actual measurements.

In a 2002 NASA study, it was suggested that materials that have high hydrogen contents, such as polyethylene, can reduce primary and secondary cosmic radiation to a greater extent than metals, such as aluminium. Vinyl polymer may also be used in laboratories and other applications for radiation shield garments.

== Gallery ==
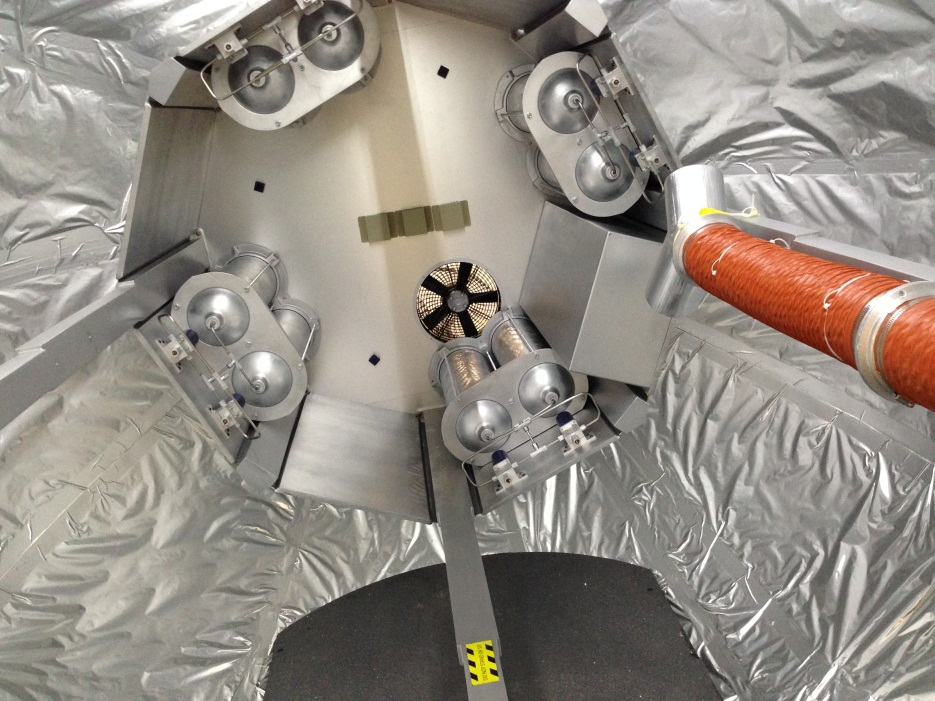
Interior of BEAM mock-up

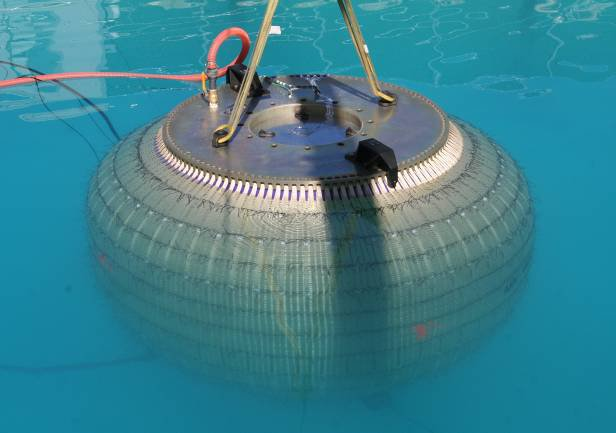
BEAM development unit undergoing burst test

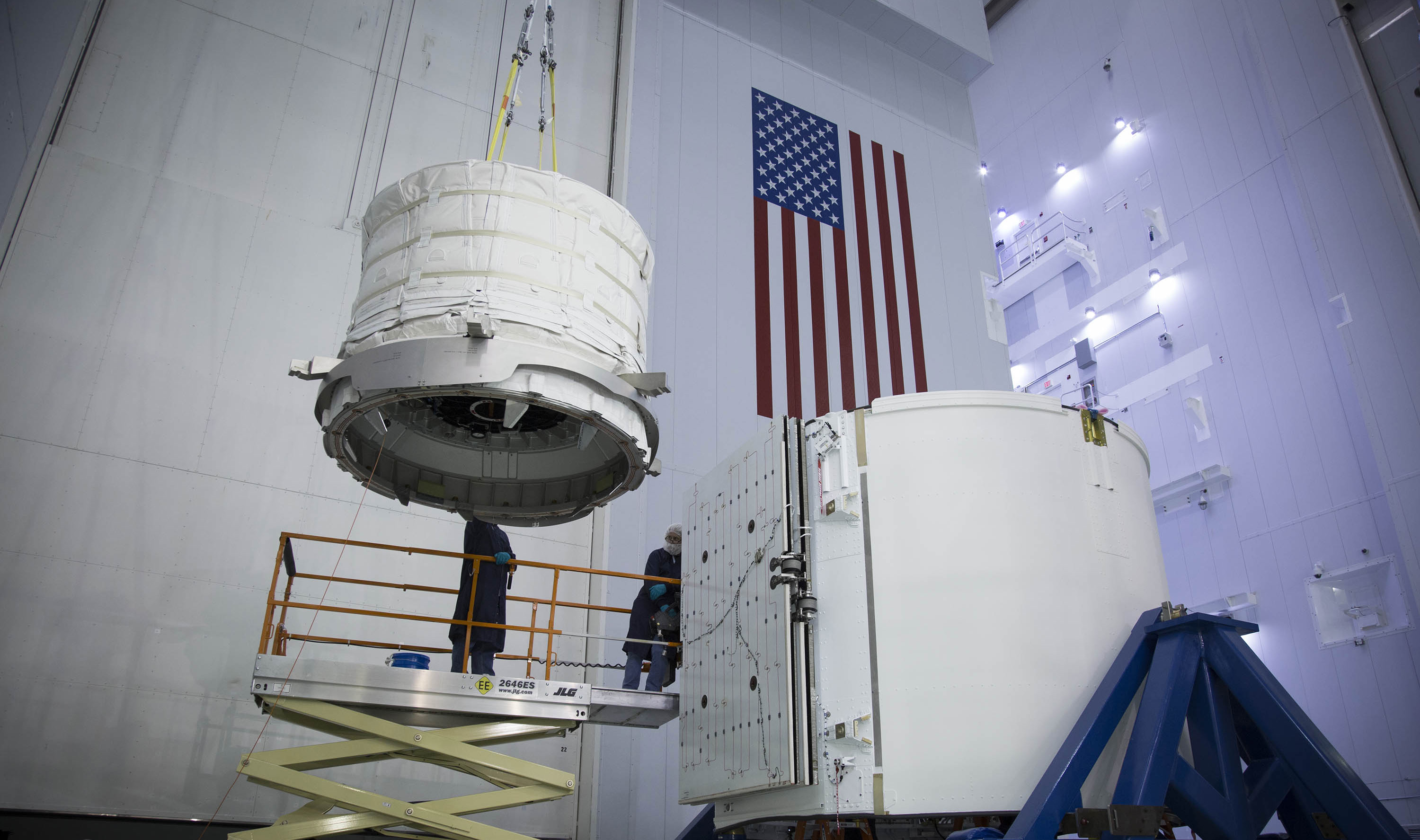
BEAM being loaded into SPACEX Dragon's trunk in February 2016

== See also ==
- B330, an inflatable space habitat
- B2100, concept
