= Bigelow Peak =

Mountain in the American state of California

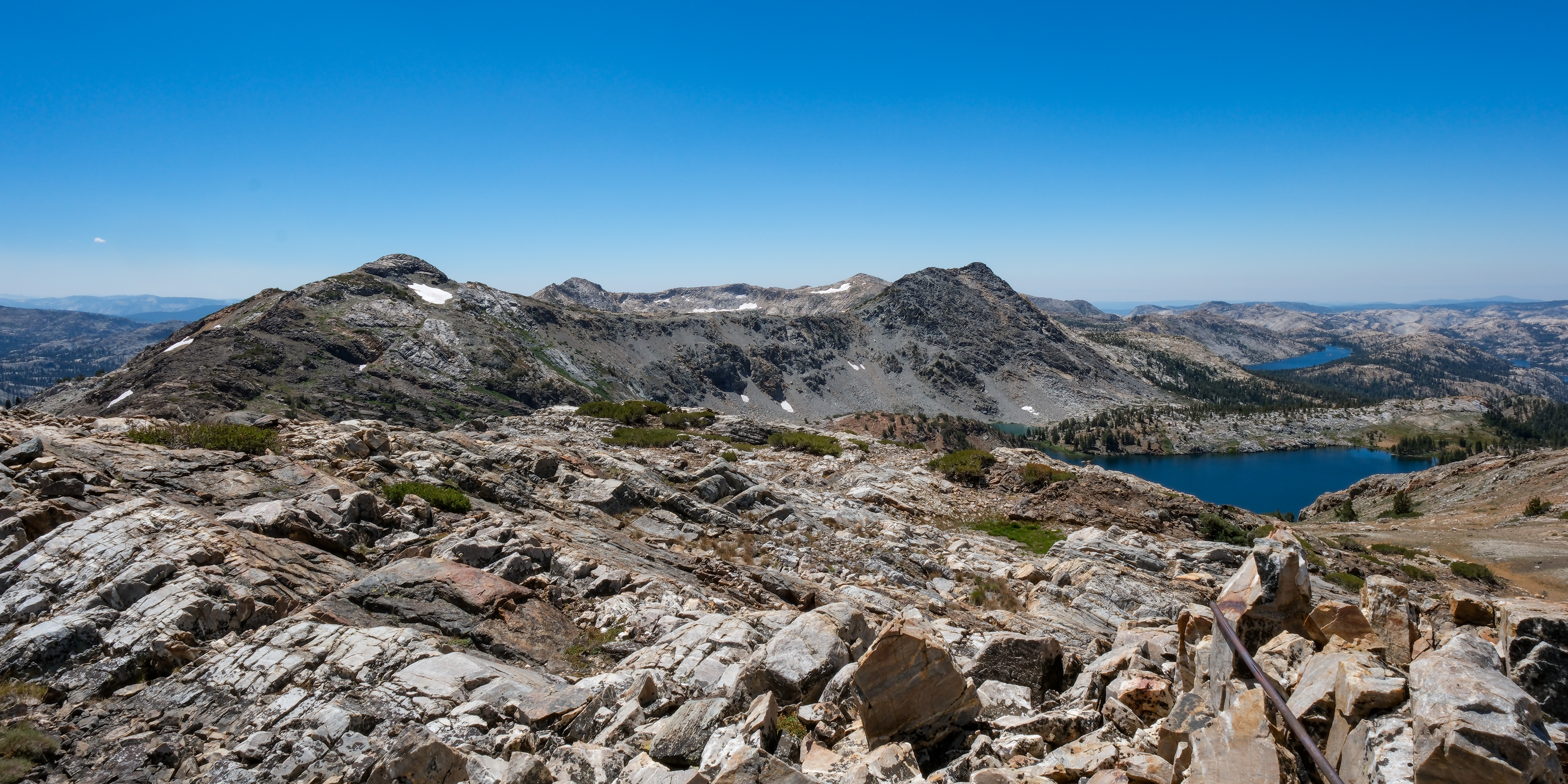
- Bigelow Peak (left) from the summit of Quartzite Peak

Highest point
- Elevation: 10,542 ft (3,213 m)
- Prominence: 819 ft (250 m)
- Coordinates: 38°8′56.90″N 119°37′40.76″W

Geography
- Location within California
- Location: Yosemite National Park, Tuolumne County, California, United States
- Parent range: Sierra Nevada
- Topo map: USGS Emigrant Lake

Bigelow Peak is a summit in Yosemite National Park, United States. With an elevation of 10,541 feet (3,213 m), Bigelow Peak is the 504th highest summit in the state of California.

Bigelow Peak was named for John Bigelow, Jr., a Yosemite National Park official.
