= C. O. Bigelow =

American pharmacy and beauty brand

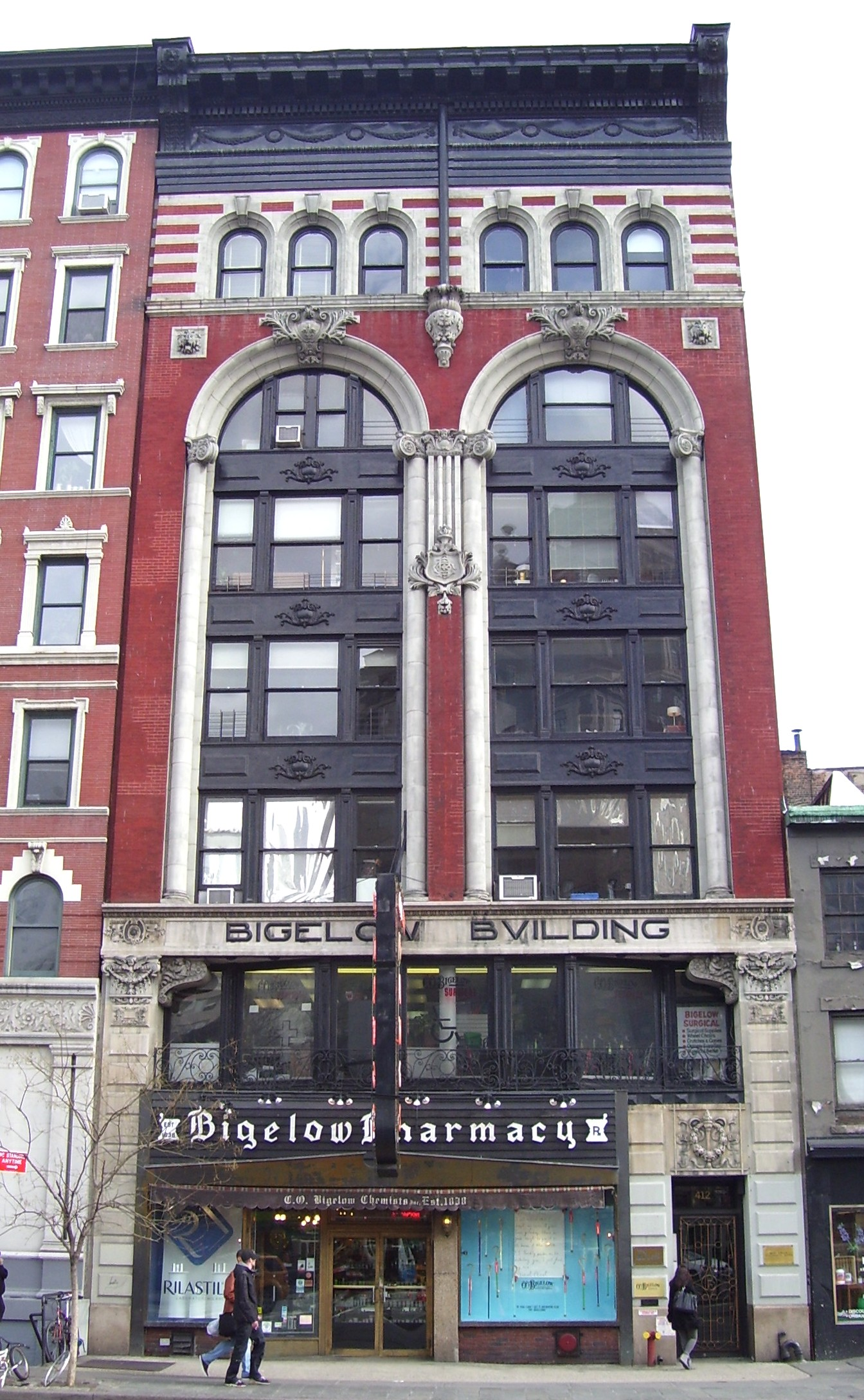
- Storefront of C.O. Bigelow Apothecaries on Sixth Avenue in New York City
- Predecessor: The Village Apothecary Shop
- Founded: 1838 (188 years ago)
- Founder: Dr. Galen Hunter
- Headquarters: New York City, U.S.
- Number of locations: 1 (2026)
- Key people: Ian Ginsberg (president; since 1996); Alec Ginsberg (COO; since 2016)
- Website: https://www.bigelowchemists.com/

C. O. Bigelow Apothecaries is an American pharmacy and beauty brand founded in 1838 by Dr. Galen Hunter as The Village Apothecary Shop in Greenwich Village, New York. Currently owned and operated by Ian Ginsberg, C. O. Bigelow is the oldest surviving apothecary–pharmacy in the United States.

In the late 1800s, the pharmacy was purchased by Clarence Otis Bigelow, who renamed the store after himself. He subsequently built the Bigelow Building at 414 Sixth Avenue, and in 1902 the pharmacy moved into the new location where it has remained ever since. During the Great Depression, the store had become run-down, and it was sold to William B. Ginsberg, an Eastern-European immigrant who came to New York and earned his Doctorate of Pharmacy from Columbia University. The Ginsberg family has owned and operated the apothecary since 1939, passing from William, to his son Jerry Ginsberg, and eventually to his son Ian Ginsberg. Alec Ginsberg, Ian's son and fourth generation pharmacist, currently serves as the company's Chief Operating Officer after joining full-time in 2016.

Limited Brands had an agreement to open and operate other stores bearing the Bigelow name, which were operated as upscale beauty and skin care stores to compete with other stores such as Sephora and Neiman Marcus. However, all of these stores were closed, leaving only the original shop. Certain products from the line are sold in Bath & Body Works stores throughout the United States, as well as many other retail stores worldwide.

In 2002 C. O. Bigelow was honored with a Village Award from the Greenwich Village Society for Historic Preservation.

== History ==
Dr. Galen Hunter, a Vermont native, established The Village Apothecary Shop in 1838, although he did not operate the store himself. His employee, Clarence Otis Bigelow, purchased the business in 1880, eight years after Hunter's death, and renamed it C. O. Bigelow Apothecaries. He also moved the business two doors north, to a new home at 106–108 Sixth Avenue (today number 414, after the street's renumbering in 1929).

In 1939, William Ginsberg became the owner. Since then, it has been passed down through the Ginsberg family, and as of 2023 it is in the hands of Ian, grandson of William.

== Stores ==
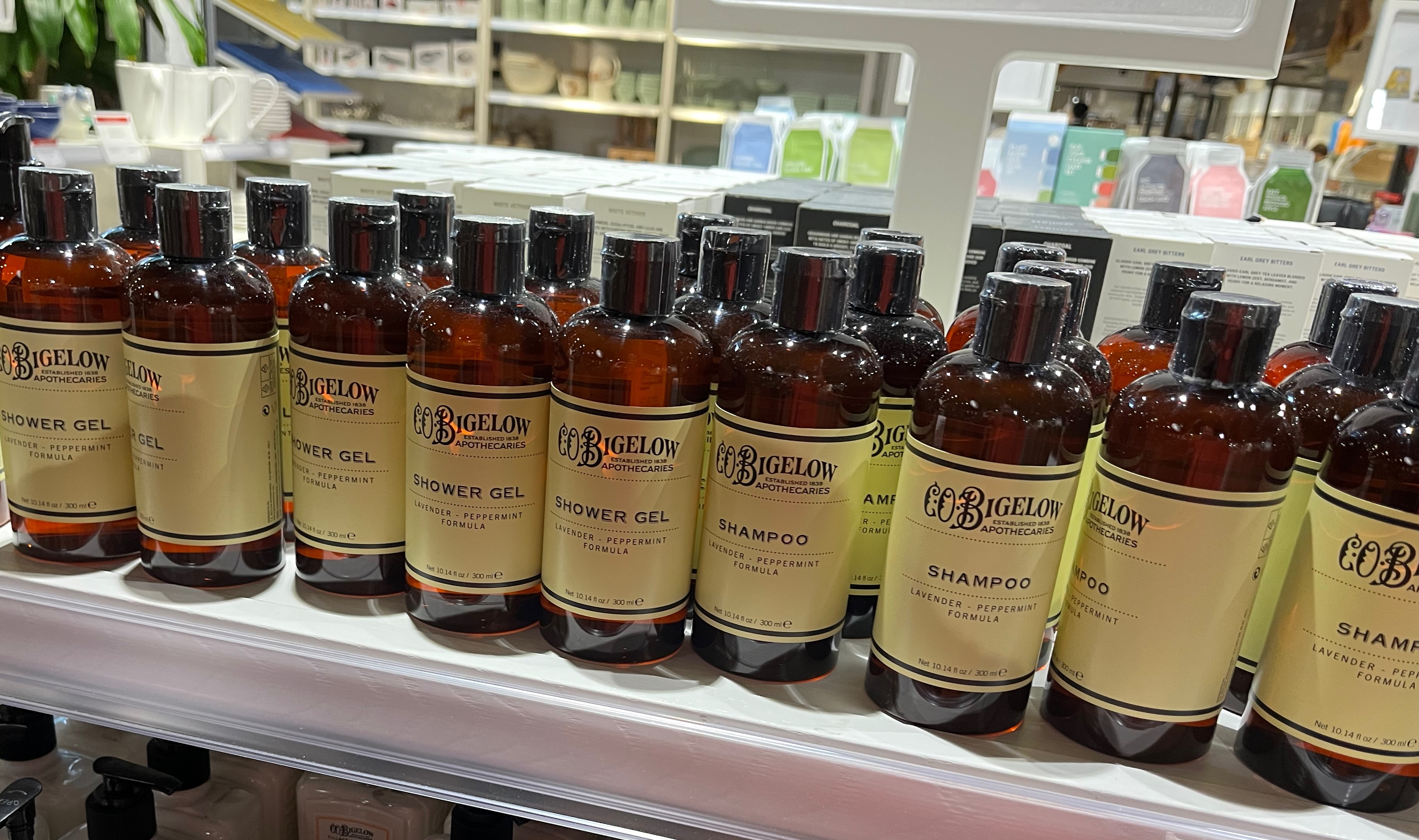
C.O. Bigelow shower gel and shampoo on display at Eataly in Boston's Prudential Center shopping mall

There was formerly a chain of stores; however, the only store still operating is the original Sixth Avenue store in Greenwich Village. Its chandeliers, though now electrified, still have their gas fittings. During the extensive blackouts on the East Coast in 1965 and 1977, Bigelow's was the only pharmacy between Maine and the Carolinas with enough light to remain open for business.

All of the other stores have closed. The Easton Town Center store in Columbus, Ohio, closed its doors in February 2012. Several stores closed in 2009: Northshore Mall in Peabody, Massachusetts, closed June 28, 2009; Westfield Garden State Plaza in Paramus, New Jersey, closed September 4, 2009; and Plaza at King of Prussia in King of Prussia, Pennsylvania/Upper Merion Township, Pennsylvania, closed July 1, 2009. Other closed stores were located in Copley Place in Boston, Westfield Hawthorn Center in Vernon Hills, Illinois, and Water Tower Place in Chicago, which closed in 2010. The location at Woodfield Mall in Schaumburg, Illinois, closed on August 18, 2012.

A C. O. Bigelow store was to be built in Tysons Corner Center in Tysons Corner, Virginia, but the scheduled construction was canceled.

== Advertising ==
Famous patrons of C. O. Bigelow, featured in advertisements, include Thomas Edison, Eleanor Roosevelt, and Mark Twain. Twain lived around the corner, at 21 Fifth Avenue.
