= Dream Chaser Tenacity =

Uncrewed cargo spaceplane built by Sierra Space

Tenacity
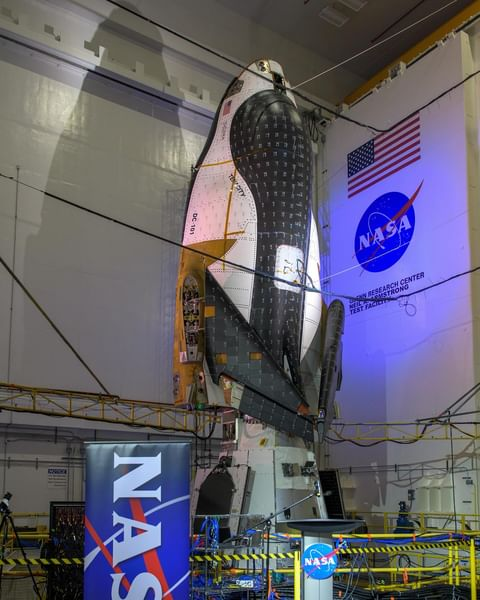
- Tenacity and its cargo module undergoing testing at NASA's Neil Armstrong Test Facility
- Type: Lifting body spaceplane
- Serial no.: DC101
- Owner: Sierra Nevada Corporation
- Manufacturer: Sierra Nevada Corporation

Specifications
- Power: Solar panels
- Rocket: Vulcan Centaur

History
- First flight: Late 2026 (planned); SSC Demo-1

Dream Chasers

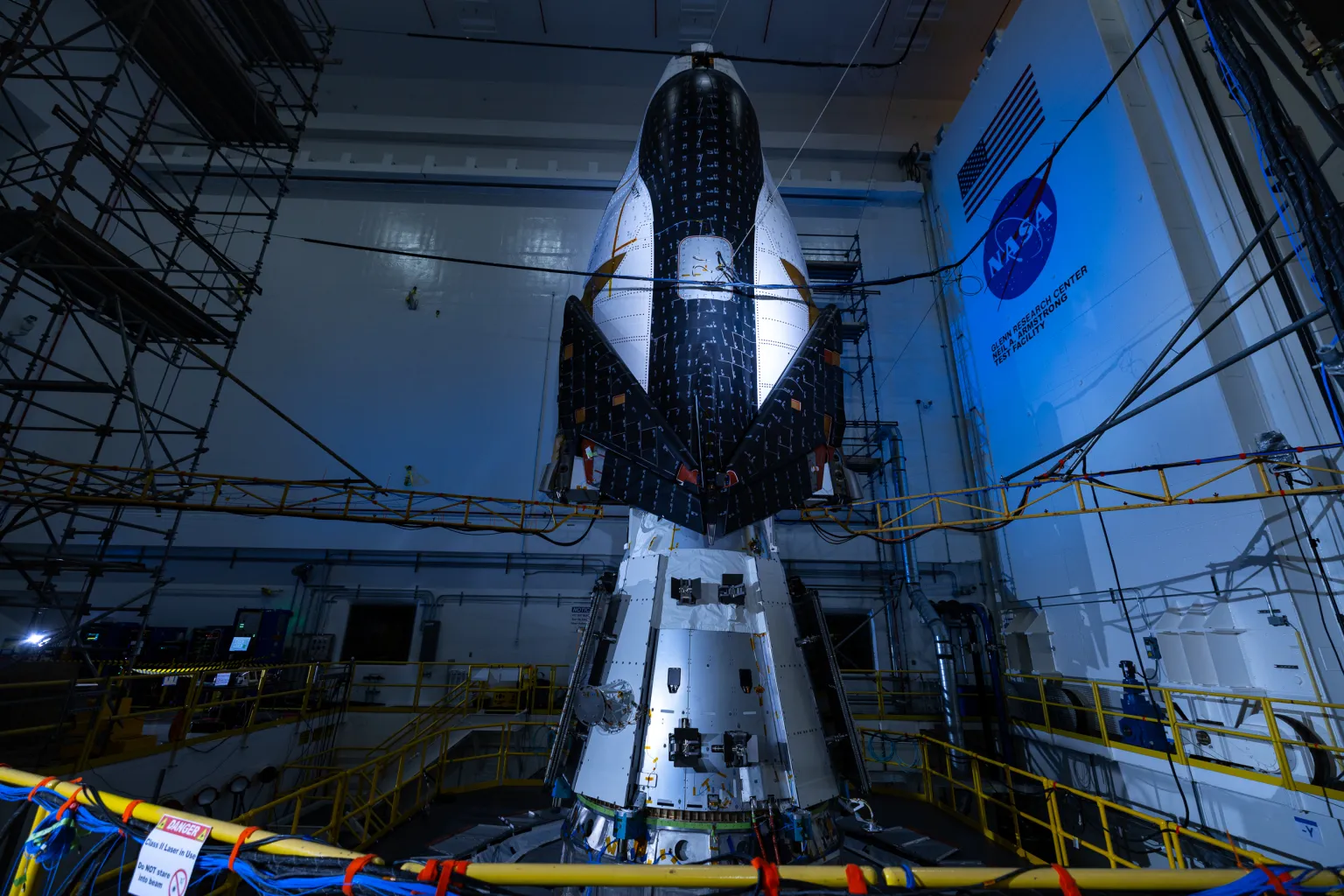
Tenacity undergoing testing

Dream Chaser Tenacity (DC101) is the first Dream Chaser spacecraft expected to fly in space. Manufactured by the Sierra Nevada Corporation, it was expected to launch to the International Space Station as part of the SSC Demo-1 mission in late 2026 under the CRS-2 contract. But has had operations changed from a docking to the ISS to a now set free-flight demonstration in LEO (Low Earth Orbit). That of which include a flight software test, 26-thruster RCS demonstration, thermal radiators display, and an testing of its autonomous re-entry system. If said demonstration does return successful: planned for future docking missions under the CRS-2 contract post-vehicle certification.

== Background ==
The Sierra Nevada Corporation was awarded a CRS-2 contract for by NASA for six operational resupply spaceflights to the International Space Station. SSC Demo-1 is a demo flight that will precede the operational resupply flights if the mission is successful.

Tenacity and other Dream Chasers will be mated with a Shooting Star module, which will provide an additional 10,000 lb (4,500 kg) of payload capacity, in addition to the 2,000 lb (910 kg) carried by the spaceplane. The module will be separated from the Dream Chaser prior to reentry and burn up in the atmosphere, while the Dream Chaser vehicle will perform a runway landing to be reused.

== Status ==
In 2023, Tenacity was still under development. Overall, the spacecraft's structure was largely complete, but it was still being prepared for the mission.

By 2024, the spacecraft and its Shooting Star module were stacked and undergoing vibration and acoustics tests at NASA's Neil Armstrong Test Facility. Additionally, the Vulcan Centaur rocket that will carry it had its maiden flight on 8 January 2024, paving the way for Tenacity's first launch. In April 2024, it was reported that Tenacity would soon be arriving at Kennedy Space Center.

In October 2024, the first flight of Tenacity, SSC Demo-1, was planned to dock at the ISS in the third quarter of 2025. In September 2025, this flight was delayed to late 2026 and will no longer dock at the ISS.

== Name ==
The Sierra Space team named its first orbit-capable Dream Chaser Tenacity as a tribute to all the years of hard work they undertook for the spacecraft to reach its maiden flight.

== Flights ==
Mission	Launch date	Duration	Landing date	Description	Outcome
SSC Demo-1	NET Late 2026	45 days (planned)	NET Late 2026 (planned)	First Dream Chaser demonstration flight, originally planned to visit the ISS, now a free flying flight.	Planned
