= SSC Demo-1 =

Planned 2027 American test spaceflight

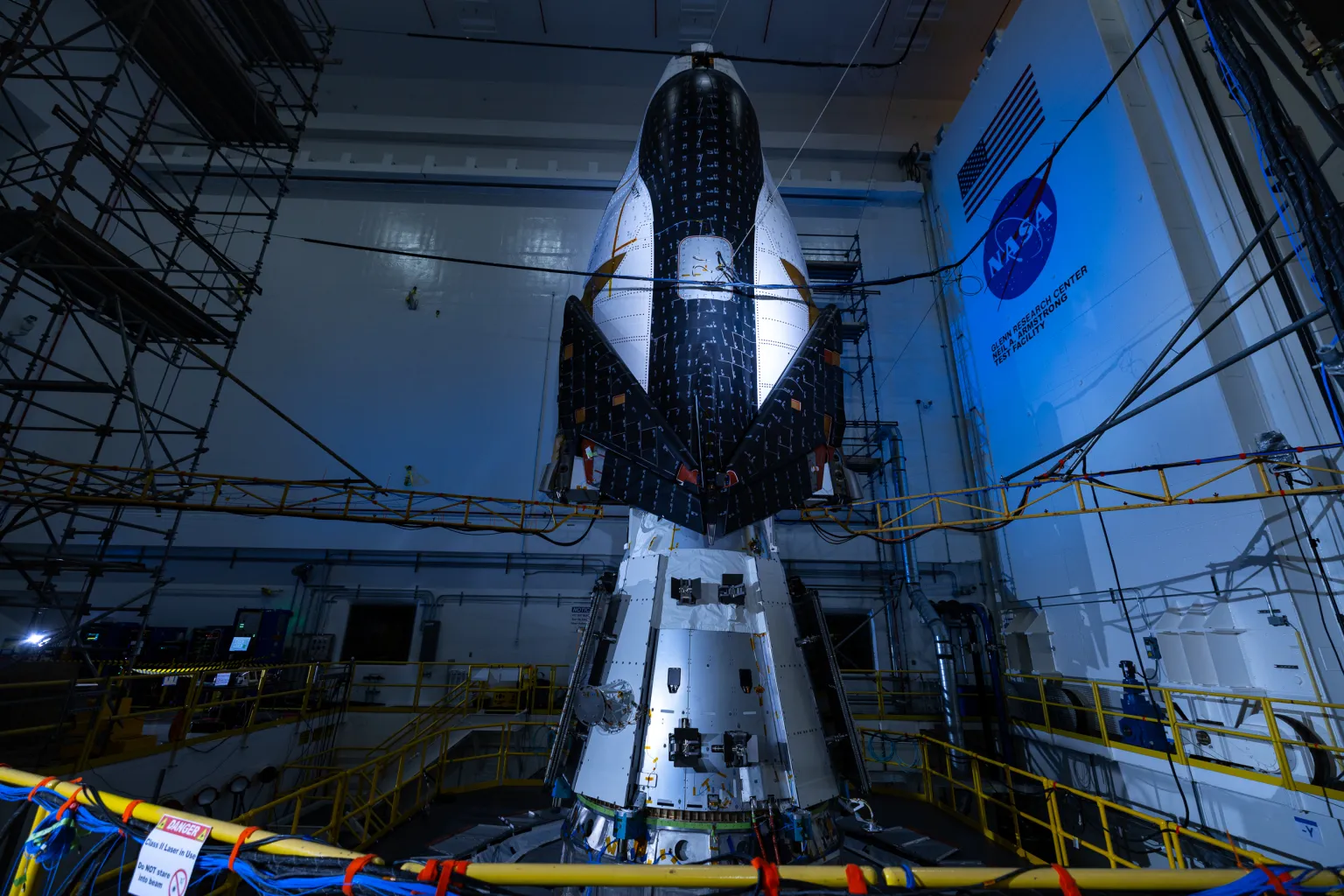
- Dream Chaser Tenacity and its Shooting Star cargo module undergoing testing
- Names: Dream Chaser Demo-1
- Mission type: Flight test
- Operator: Sierra Nevada Corporation
- Website: sierraspace.com/dream-chaser-spaceplane
- Mission duration: 45 days (planned)

Spacecraft properties
- Spacecraft: Dream Chaser Tenacity
- Spacecraft type: Dream Chaser
- Manufacturer: Sierra Nevada; Lockheed Martin

Start of mission
- Launch date: NET Q2 2027
- Rocket: Vulcan Centaur VC4L (Note: VC4L designates that this is a Vulcan Centaur with four solid rocket boosters and a long payload fairing.)
- Launch site: Cape Canaveral, SLC‑41
- Contractor: United Launch Alliance

End of mission
- Landing site: Vandenberg, Runway 12

Orbital parameters
- Reference system: Geocentric orbit
- Regime: Low Earth orbit

SSC Demo-1, also known as Dream Chaser Demo-1, is the planned first flight of the Sierra Space robotic spacecraft Dream Chaser to low Earth orbit under the CRS-2 contract with NASA. Originally scheduled to go to the International Space Station (ISS) in 2025, in September 2025, NASA announced the mission would not visit the ISS and instead launch no earlier than the second quarter of 2027.

The Dream Chaser division of the Sierra Nevada Corporation (SNC) was spun-off in April 2021, creating the fully independent Sierra Space Corporation (SSC), which assumed full oversight over the Dream Chaser program. The company developed a new reusable spacecraft to provide commercial cargo resupply services to the International Space Station (ISS), based on decades of lifting body programs. Under the Commercial Orbital Transportation Services (COTS) program, the company designed Dream Chaser with industrial partner Lockheed Martin.

The company also designed the accompanying Shooting Star cargo module with subcontractor Applied Composites. At the end of mission, the Shooting Star will destructively reenter the atmosphere and the Dream Chaser will land at the Vandenberg Space Force Base.

== Spacecraft ==
The Dream Chaser Cargo System will fly cargo resupply missions to the ISS under NASA's Commercial Resupply Services-2 program. This system features the Shooting Star, an expendable cargo module with solar panels, and the Dream Chaser, a reusable lifting body capable of returning 1,750 kg (3,860 lb) of pressurized cargo to Earth while undergoing maximum re-entry forces of 1.5 g.

The Dream Chaser design is derived from NASA's HL-20 Personnel Launch System spaceplane concept from the 1990s, which in turn is descended from over 20,000 hours and six decades of experimental lifting body vehicles, including the X-20 Dyna-Soar, Northrop M2-F2, Northrop M2-F3, Northrop HL-10, Martin X-24A and X-24B, and Martin X-23 PRIME.

The vehicle to be used in SSC Demo-1 is named Tenacity. The Shooting Star carries pressurized and unpressurized cargo, and serves as the power supply for the Dream Chaser. The Shooting Star will have a cargo capacity of 4,536 kg (10,000 lb). Its design is similar to the Exoliner cargo container shown in Lockheed Martin's Jupiter proposal for NASA's CRS-2.

== Mission ==
SSC Demo-1 is the Dream Chaser demonstration mission under the Commercial Resupply Services-2 (CRS-2) contract with NASA. Production and integration of the Dream Chaser spacecraft is performed in Texas, Colorado, and Florida. The Dream Chaser is mated with the Shooting Star at the launch site, and mission operations are conducted from control centers in Colorado and Houston, Texas. Sierra Nevada selected ULA's Vulcan Centaur as its launch vehicle for this Demo-1 mission and the six contracted NASA CRS-2 missions.

The Dream Chaser arrived at the Space Systems Processing Facility at Kennedy Space Center on May 20, 2024, to undergo "final testing and prelaunch processing." The Dream Chaser would finish its certification testing and was returned to Sierra Space's facility in Louisville, Colorado in April 2026. There the vehicle will undergo hot-fire tests and mission-specific modifications for the demo flight with launch targeted for no earlier than the second quarter of 2027.

== See also ==
- SpaceX COTS Demo Flight 1 – SpaceX Dragon demonstration flight that did not include a docking test (October 2010)
- Orbital-D1 – First Cygnus demonstration flight to dock to ISS (September 2013)
