= Eren Özmen =

Turkish businesswoman

- Born: 1958 or 1959 (age 67–68); Izmir, Turkey
- Education: University of Nevada, Reno (MBA)
- Occupation: Businesswoman
- Known for: Owner and president of Sierra Nevada Corporation, Dream Chaser mini space shuttle
- Spouse: Fatih Özmen
- Children: 2
- Website: www.sncorp.com/personnel/eren-ozmen/

Eren Özmen (born 1958/1959) is a Turkish-American billionaire businesswoman, and the majority co-owner and president of the private aerospace and defense company, Sierra Nevada Corporation (SNC).

== Early life and education ==
In the early 1980s, Eren Özmen came to the United States from Turkey to pursue higher education. In 1985, she earned an MBA from the University of Nevada, Reno, and in 1988, she joined SNC.

== Career ==
Özmen and her husband Fatih Özmen acquired Sierra Nevada Corporation in 1994. Under the Özmens, SNC has acquired 19 companies in 34 locations in 19 US states, England, Germany and Turkey, and has grown to include a workforce of over 3,000 personnel.

Özmen has prioritized maintaining a healthy work-life balance by promoting family-friendly policies within the corporate culture. In 1991 she established an on-site daycare for employees.

In 2017, Eren and Fatih Özmen launched Özmen Ventures, a seed and early-stage venture capital fund headquartered in Reno. The $5 million fund aims to invest in young and dynamic local startups and cultivate the local entrepreneurial ecosystem.

== Philanthropy ==
In 2014, Eren and Fatih Özmen donated $5 million to the University of Nevada, Reno, to create a permanent center for entrepreneurship at the university's college of business. The Özmen Center for Entrepreneurship supports and enhances the university's entrepreneurial programs in order to stimulate the creation of new business ventures.

In May 2016, the Özmen Center for Entrepreneurship launched a Women's Initiative aimed at connecting innovative female entrepreneurs with leaders and established professionals and business owners in the community. It also highlights female business achievements in and around the community.

== Personal life ==
She is married to Fatih Özmen, they have two children, and live in Reno, Nevada.
