= Fatih Özmen =

Turkish-American aerospace engineer, entrepreneur and former cyclist

- Education: University of Nevada, Reno (MS)
- Occupations: Aerospace engineer, entrepreneur
- Known for: Owner and CEO of Sierra Nevada Corporation, Dream Chaser mini space shuttle
- Spouse: Eren Özmen
- Website: www.sncorp.com/personnel/fatih-ozmen/

Fatih Özmen (born 1957 or 1958) is a Turkish-American aerospace engineer, entrepreneur, former cyclist, the co-owner and CEO of Sierra Nevada Corporation (SNC). Özmen is among the 900 richest people in the world as of September 2025.

== Early life and education ==
Born in Turkey, the former Turkish National Cycling Champion rode alongside top Turkish cyclists throughout the 1970s including the 1977 Tour de L'avenir in France. Fatih Özmen pursued higher education in the United States receiving a M.S. Degree in Electrical Engineering from the University of Nevada, Reno. He went on to obtain a master's degree, with a thesis on navigation and landing systems.

== Career ==
Özmen started at Sierra Nevada Corporation as an engineering intern in 1981; during his early years at the company, he helped develop numerous systems and managed several key programs. In 1994, Fatih Özmen and his wife Eren Ozmen acquired Sierra Nevada Corporation. Under the Ozmens, SNC has completed 19 strategic acquisitions, and has expanded to 34 locations in 19 U.S. states, England, Germany and Turkey, with a workforce of over 3,000 personnel

Fatih is a member of the National Space Council Users Advisory Group, established in 2018 under Vice President Mike Pence.

In 2017, Fatih and Eren Özmen launched Özmen Ventures, a $5 million venture capital fund headquartered in Reno.

== Philanthropy ==
In 2014, Fatih and wife Eren donated $5 million to the University of Nevada, Reno’s College of Business to support entrepreneurial programs.

== Awards and recognition ==
=== Personal ===
- Aviation Entrepreneurs of the Year
- Living Legends of Aviation
- "Ellis Island Medal of Honor"
- Top 10 Most Influential Turkish Americans, TurkOfAmerica
- Honorary Doctorate of Science – University of Nevada, Reno (2016)
- On May 13, 2016, Fatih Özmen delivered the keynote speech at the University of Nevada, Reno commencement ceremony.
