= Thor III =

THOR III
- Type: Counter radio-controlled IED jamming device
- Place of origin: United States

Service history
- Used by: US Armed Forces
- Wars: War in Afghanistan (2001–2021)

Production history
- Manufacturer: Sierra Nevada Corporation
- Produced: 2009

Specifications
- Crew: Carried by 1 soldier

The THOR III is man-portable, counter-radio-controlled improvised explosive device (IED) jammer built by Sierra Nevada Corp, designed to counter specifically Radio Controlled Improvised Explosive Devices (RCIED). It was employed by the U.S. Army, U.S. Marine Corps, and partnered Afghan National Army soldiers in Afghanistan. Sierra Nevada received the initial contract in December 2007. This system uses three transceivers mounted on backpacks to jam radio-controlled IEDs; each of the three different transceivers jams a different frequency bandwidth (Low, Mid, and High). Power requirements: Low-band, 2.5amps; Mid-band, 4.0amps; High-band, 5.0amps.

== See also ==
- Joint Improvised Explosive Device Defeat Organization (JIEDDO)
