= Dream Chaser =

US reusable automated cargo lifting-body spaceplane

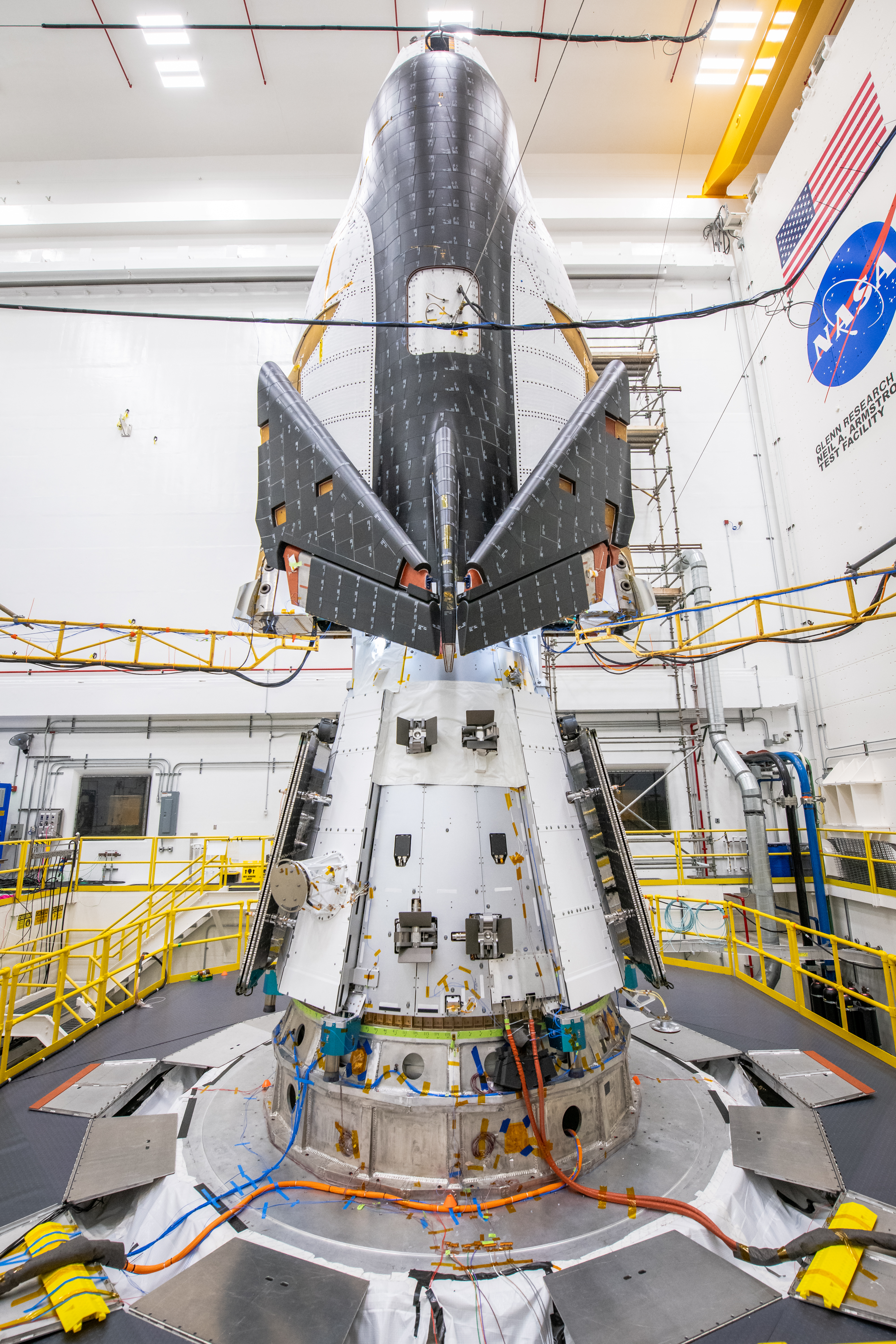
- Dream Chaser Tenacity at NASA’s Neil Armstrong Test Facility in 2024
- Manufacturer: Sierra Space
- Country of origin: United States
- Operator: NASA
- Applications: International Space Station (ISS) resupply

Specifications
- Spacecraft type: Robotic cargo vehicle version, also Crewed orbital spaceplane version
- Payload capacity: 5,000 kg (11,000 lb) pressurized, 500 kg (1,100 lb) unpressurized
- Crew capacity: 0 (cargo); 3–7 (crew)
- Regime: LEO

Production
- Status: Active
- Built: 3
- Launched: 0 (4 atmospheric tests)
- Operational: 1

Related spacecraft
- Derived from: HL-20 Personnel Launch System
- Launch vehicle: Vulcan Centaur

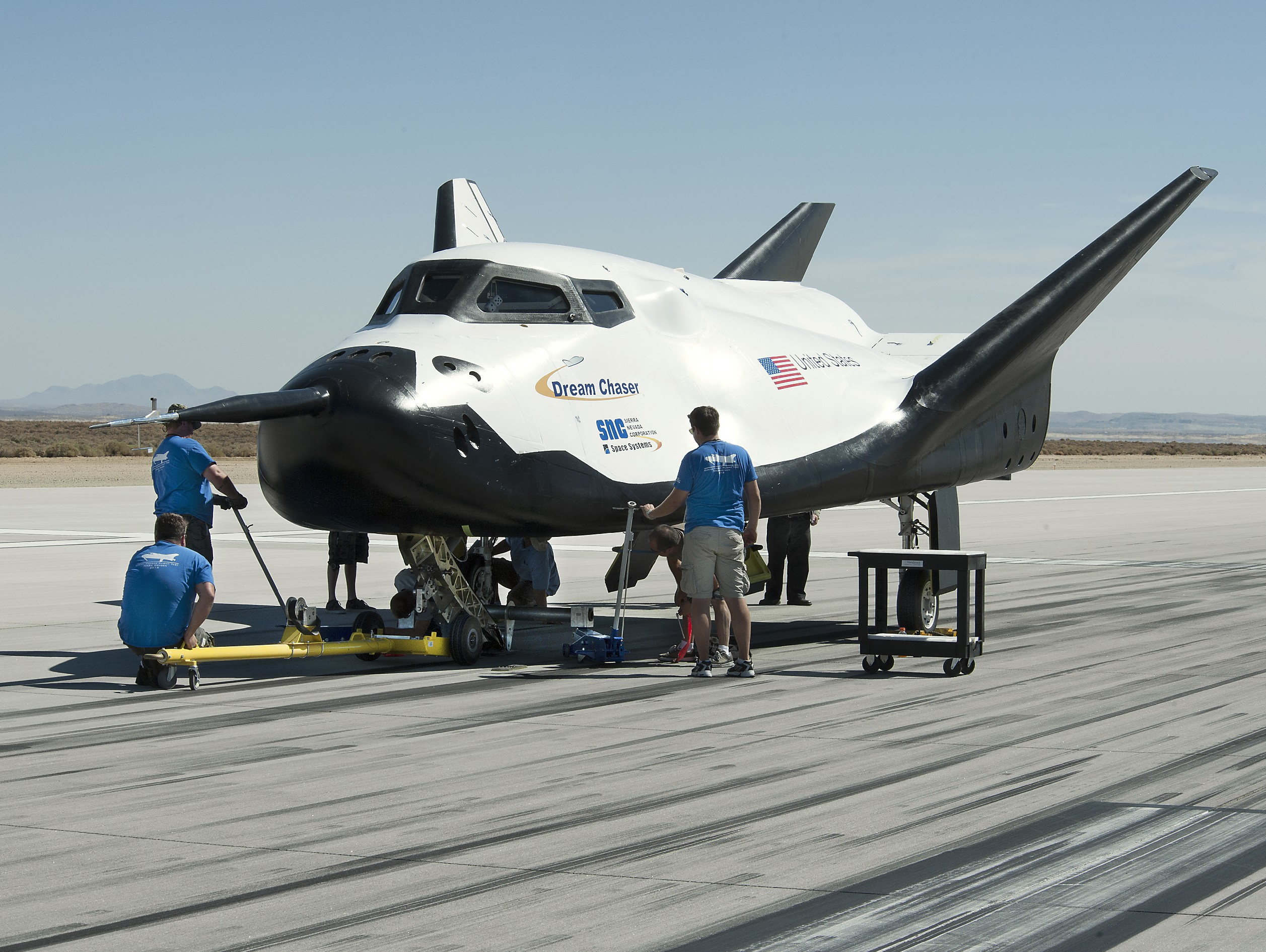
Dream Chaser flight test vehicle in 2013

Dream Chaser is an American reusable lifting-body spaceplane developed by Sierra Space. Conceived as a crewed vehicle, it is being developed in a cargo configuration known as the Dream Chaser Cargo System for missions to the International Space Station (ISS) under NASA's Commercial Resupply Services program.

Development of Dream Chaser began in 2004 as a project of SpaceDev, which was acquired by Sierra Nevada Corporation (SNC) in 2008. In 2021, the program was transferred to Sierra Space, a subsidiary spun off from SNC as an independent company. The first Dream Chaser vehicle, Tenacity, was completed in November 2023.

Dream Chaser is designed for vertical takeoff and horizontal landing, launching atop a Vulcan Centaur rocket and landing on conventional runways. It is capable of carrying both pressurized and unpressurized cargo. A proposed variant for the European Space Agency would launch aboard an Ariane 6 rocket. The first flight of Dream Chaser was originally scheduled for the second flight of Vulcan Centaur but was not ready in time. As of April 2026, the spacecraft's propulsion system and software had not yet been certified by NASA, and the spacecraft's initial mission, SSC Demo-1 in late 2027, will no longer dock at the ISS as originally planned.

The Dream Chaser's design is derived from NASA's HL-20 Personnel Launch System, a lifting-body concept studied in the 1980s and 1990s.

== Spacecraft ==
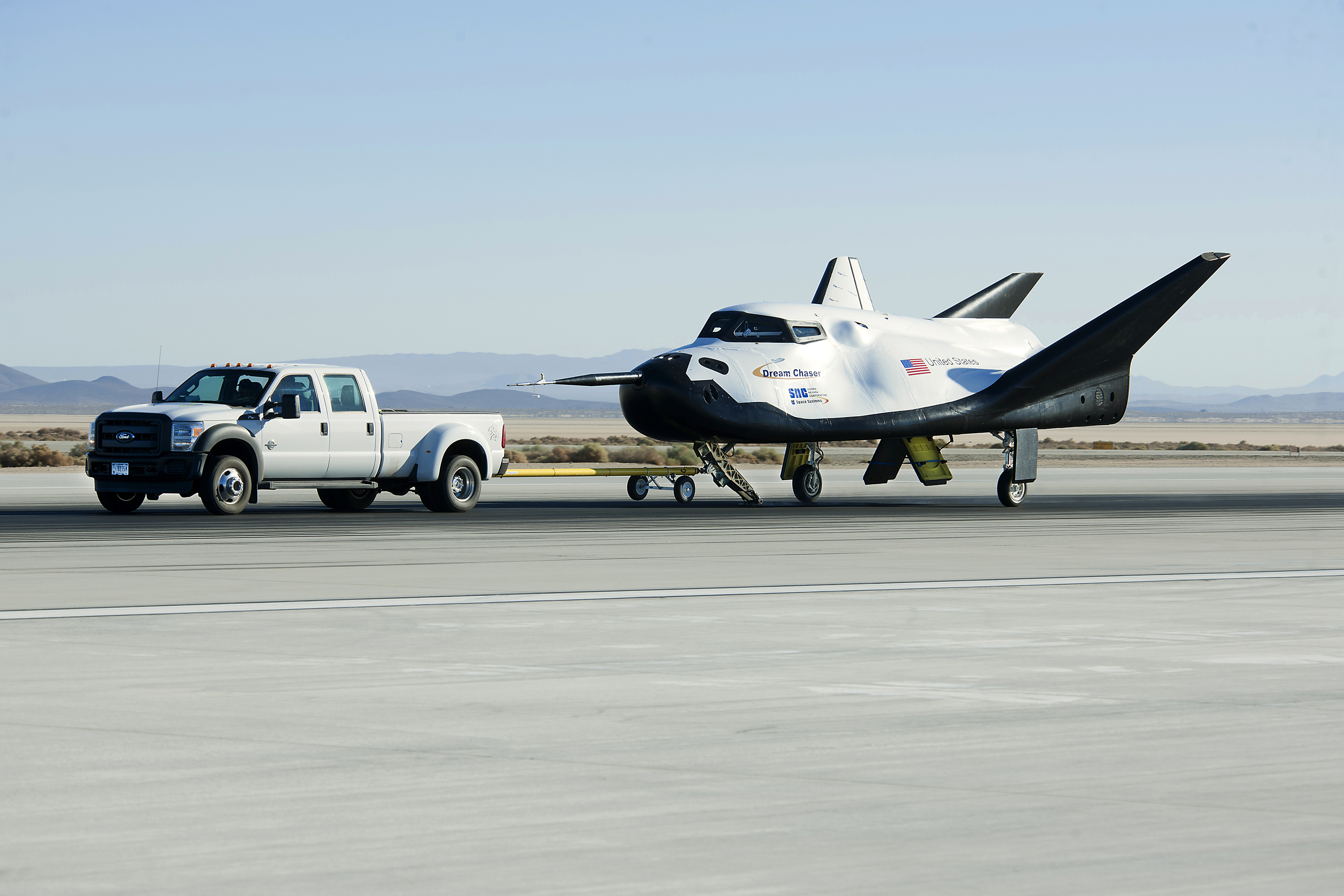
Dream Chaser engineering test article, being driven along the runway by a pickup truck after an atmospheric test

The Dream Chaser spaceplane is designed to be launched on the top of a typical rocket and land like an airplane on a runway. The design has heritage going back decades. Currently, the Dream Chaser will resupply the ISS with cargo. Per the company's website, a crew version is planned for a later date.

Sierra Space was contracted under CRS-2 to perform resupply missions to the ISS, but in a September 2025 contract change Sierra Space only needs to perform a free flight demonstration, with NASA optionally booking resupply missions.

=== Propulsion ===
On-orbit propulsion of the Dream Chaser was originally proposed to be provided by twin hybrid rocket engines capable of repeated starts and throttling. At the time, the SSC's predecessor, the SNC was also developing a similar hybrid rocket for Virgin Galactic's SpaceShipTwo. In May 2014, SNC involvement in the SpaceShipTwo program ended.

After the acquisition of Orbitec LLC in July 2014, Sierra Nevada Corporation announced a major change to the propulsion system. The hybrid rocket engine design was dropped in favor of a cluster of Orbitec's Vortex engines. The new unit would be a pressure-fed three-mode engine. At low- and mid-power regimes it uses monopropellant fuel – hydrogen peroxide – and in high-power demand, the engine adds injection of RP-1 fuel. This increased thrust will be useful to shorten the de-orbit burn duration of the Dream Chaser.

=== Thermal protection system ===
Its thermal protection system (TPS) is made up of silica-based tiles (for most of the belly and upper portion of the heat shield), and a new composite material called Toughened Unipiece Fibrous Reusable Oxidation Resistant Ceramic (TUFROC) to cover the nose and leading edges.

=== Shooting Star module ===
In 2019, it was announced that an expendable Shooting Star cargo module would be part of the Dream Chaser cargo system for CRS-2 flights. The module is a 15-foot-long (4.6 m) attachment to Dream Chaser that will allow the spacecraft to carry an additional 10,000 pounds (4,500 kg) of pressurized and unpressurized cargo to ISS. The module supports disposal of unwanted cargo by burning up upon re-entry.

In addition to carrying cargo, the Shooting Star module includes solar panels that supply up to 6 kW of electrical power. It also supplies active and passive thermal management; provides Dream Chaser translation and rotation capability via six mounted thrusters; and supports berthing or docking (in different configurations) to the ISS. Access from ISS to Dream Chaser will involve crew passing through Shooting Star (which supports a shirt-sleeve environment) and through a hatch that separates Shooting Star from Dream Chaser. Sierra Nevada says the module is capable of additional types of missions in LEO or to cis-lunar destinations; they have developed a free-flying variant with additional capabilities.

In July 2020, Sierra Nevada announced a contract with the Defense Innovation Unit (DIU) to use its Shooting Star expendable cargo vehicle as a possible commercial solution for a high-powered uncrewed orbital outpost.

=== Technology partners ===
In 2010, the following organizations were named as technology partners for the original passenger Dream Chaser:

- Aerojet – reaction control system technology
- AdamWorks – composites
- Charles Stark Draper Laboratory – guidance, navigation, and control
- Lockheed Martin – airframe construction and human rating of the spaceplane
- MDA – systems engineering
- University of Colorado – human-rating

== History ==
The Dream Chaser design is derived from NASA's HL-20 Personnel Launch System spaceplane concept, which in turn is descended from a series of test vehicles, including the Northrop M2-F2, Northrop M2-F3, Northrop HL-10, Martin X-24A and X-24B, and Martin X-23 PRIME.

The name "Dream Chaser" had been previously used for two separate space vehicle concepts. The first was planned to be an orbital vehicle based on the HL-20, with the second suborbital vehicle proposed by the Benson Space Company for the purposes of space tourism.

The Dream Chaser was publicly announced on September 20, 2004. In April 2007, SpaceDev announced that it had partnered with the United Launch Alliance to pursue the possibility of using the Atlas V booster rocket as the Dream Chaser's launch vehicle. In June 2007, SpaceDev signed a Space Act agreement with NASA.

On October 21, 2008, SpaceDev with Dream Chaser was acquired by the Sierra Nevada Corporation for US$38 million.

=== CCDev phase 1 ===
On February 1, 2010, Sierra Nevada Corporation was awarded $20 million in seed money under NASA's Commercial Crew Development (CCDev) phase 1 program for the development of the Dream Chaser. SNC completed the four planned milestones on time, including hybrid rocket test fires and the preliminary structure design. Further initial Dream Chaser tests included the drop test of a 15% scaled version at the NASA Dryden Flight Research Center.

=== CCDev phase 2 ===
Sierra Nevada proposed Dream Chaser for the CCDev phase 2 solicitation by NASA in October 2010, with an estimated project cost of less than $1 billion. On 18 April 2011, NASA awarded $80 million to Sierra Nevada Corporation for Dream Chaser. Since then, nearly a dozen further milestones have been completed under that Space Act Agreement. Some of these milestones included testing of an improved airfoil fin shape, integrated flight software and hardware, landing gear, a full-scale captive carry flight test, and a Systems Requirement Review (SRR).

By February 2012, Sierra Nevada Corporation stated that it had completed the assembly and delivery of the primary structure of the first Dream Chaser flight test vehicle. With this, SNC completed all 11 of its CCDev milestones that were scheduled up to that point. SNC stated in a press release that it was "on time and on budget."

On May 29, 2012, the Dream Chaser Engineering Test Article (ETA) was lifted by an Erickson Skycrane helicopter in a captive carry test to better determine its aerodynamic properties. In May 2013, the ETA was shipped to the Dryden Flight Research Center in California for a series of ground tests and aerodynamic flight tests. A second captive carry flight test was completed on August 22, 2013.

On June 12, 2012, SNC announced the commemoration of its fifth year as a NASA Langley partner in the design and development of Dream Chaser. The NASA/SNC team had worked on aerodynamic and aerothermal analysis of Dream Chaser, as well as guidance, navigation, and control systems. Together with ULA, the NASA/SNC team performed buffet tests on the Dream Chaser and Atlas V stack.

On July 11, 2012, SNC announced that it successfully completed testing of the nose landing gear for Dream Chaser. This milestone evaluated the impact to the landing gear during simulated approach and landing tests as well as the impact of future orbital flights. The main landing gear was tested in a similar way in February 2012. The nose gear landing test was the last milestone to be completed before the free flight approach and landing tests scheduled for later in 2012. In August 2012, SNC completed CCiCap Milestone 1, or the 'Program Implementation Plan Review'. This included creating a plan for implementing design, development, testing, and evaluation activities through the duration of CCiCap funding. By October 2012 the "Integrated System Baseline Review", or CCiCap Milestone 2, had been completed. This review demonstrated the maturity of the Dream Chaser Space System as well as the integration and support of the Atlas V launch vehicle, mission systems, and ground systems.

=== CCiCap ===
On August 3, 2012, NASA announced the award of $212.5 million to Sierra Nevada Corporation to continue work on the Dream Chaser under the Commercial Crew Integrated Capability (CCiCap) Program. On January 30, 2013, SNC announced a new partnership with Lockheed Martin. Under the agreement, SNC will pay Lockheed Martin $10 million to build the second airframe at its Michoud facility in New Orleans, Louisiana. This second airframe is slated to be the first orbital test vehicle, with orbital flight testing planned to begin within the next two years.

In January 2013, Sierra Nevada announced that the second captive carry and first unpowered drop test of Dream Chaser would take place at Edwards Air Force Base, California in March 2013. The spaceplane release would occur at 12,000 feet (3,700 m) altitude and would be followed by an autonomous robotic landing.

On March 13, 2013, NASA announced that former Space Shuttle commander Lee Archambault was leaving the agency in order to join SNC. Archambault, a former combat pilot and 15-year NASA veteran who flew on Atlantis and Discovery, will work on the Dream Chaser program as a systems engineer and test pilot.

On October 26, 2013, the first free-flight occurred. The test vehicle was released from the helicopter and flew the correct flightpath to touchdown less than a minute later. Just prior to landing, the left main landing gear failed to deploy resulting in a crash landing. The vehicle skidded off the runway in a cloud of dust, but was found upright with the crew compartment intact and all systems inside still in working order.

In January 2014, SNC announced it had signed a launch contract to fly the first orbital test vehicle on a robotically controlled orbital test flight in November 2016.

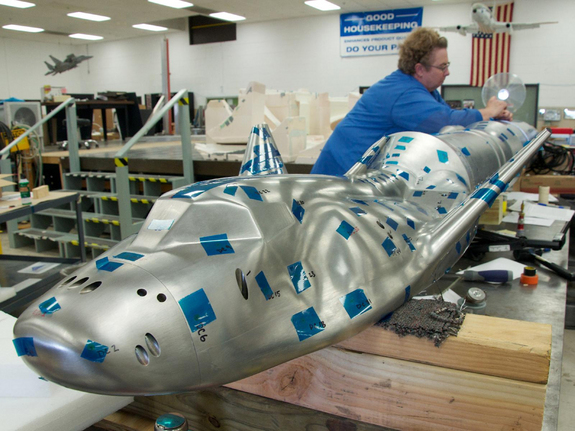
Dream Chaser model being tested at NASA Langley, aboard an Atlas V mock-up

In early 2014, Sierra Nevada completed its wind tunnel testing as part of its CCiCAP Milestone 8. The wind tunnel testing involved analyzing the flight dynamics characteristics that the vehicle will experience during orbital ascent and re-entry. Wind tunnel testing was also completed for the Dream Chaser Atlas V integrated launch system. These tests were completed at NASA Ames Research Center at Moffett Field, California, CALSPAN Transonic Wind Tunnel in New York, and at NASA Langley Research Center Unitary Plan Wind Tunnel in Hampton, Virginia.

On August 1, 2014, the first completed piece of the orbital Flight Test Article (FTA) composite airframe was unveiled at a Lockheed Martin facility.

=== CCtCap ===
On September 16, 2014, NASA did not select the Dream Chaser for CCtCap, the next phase of the Commercial Crew Program. This occurred despite previous Commercial Crew Development awards in every phase since 2009, due to lack of maturity.

On September 26, Sierra Nevada filed a protest to the US Government Accountability Office (GAO). On October 22, 2014, a Federal Judge ruled the contract awards to Boeing and SpaceX valid, allowing NASA to proceed.

On September 29, 2014, Sierra Nevada introduced the "Dream Chaser Global Project" which would provide customized access to low Earth orbit to global customers.

Despite not being selected to continue forward under NASA's Commercial Crew transportation Capability (CCtCap) phase of the effort to send crews to orbit via private companies, SNC completed the milestones assigned under earlier phases of the CCP. On December 2, 2014, SNC announced that it completed NASA's CCiCap Milestone 5a related to propulsion risk reduction for the Dream Chaser space system.

By late December, details had emerged that "a high-ranking agency official"—"William Gerstenmaier, the agency's top human exploration official and the one who made the final decision"—"opted to rank Boeing's proposal higher than a previous panel of agency procurement experts." More specifically, Sierra Nevada asserted in their filings with the GAO that Gerstenmaier may have "overstepped his authority by unilaterally changing the scoring criteria."

On January 5, 2015, the GAO denied Sierra Nevada's CCtCap challenge, stating that NASA made the proper decision when it decided to award Boeing $4.2 billion and SpaceX $2.6 billion to develop their vehicles. Ralph White, the GAO's managing associate counsel, announced that NASA "recognized Boeing's higher price but also considered Boeing's proposal to be the strongest of all three proposals in terms of technical approach, management approach and past performance, and to offer the crew transportation system with most utility and highest value to the government." Furthermore, the agency found "several favorable features" in SNC's proposal "but ultimately concluded that SpaceX's lower price made it a better value."

=== CRS-2 selection ===
In December 2014, Sierra Nevada proposed Dream Chaser for CRS-2 consideration. In January 2016, NASA announced that Dream Chaser had been awarded one of the CRS-2 contracts and committed to purchasing a minimum of six resupply missions to the ISS. The cargo spacecraft will fly alongside spacecraft from the existing CRS-1 contract holders SpaceX and Northrop Grumman Innovation Systems.

In October 2015, the thermal protection system was installed on the Engineering Test Article (ETA) for the next phase of atmospheric flight testing. The orbital cabin assembly of the Flight Test Article (FTA) was also completed by contractor Lockheed Martin.

In 2015, the ETA had reportedly been given the name Eagle, while the FTA was originally named Ascalon before being changed to Ascension.

On November 11, 2017, the Dream Chaser ETA was released from an altitude of 3,700 m and successfully landed at Edwards AFB.

In March 2019, completion of NASA's Integrated Review Milestone 5 (IR5) confirmed that development was still on schedule. In August 2019, SNC announced the first ISS flight of the Dream Chaser, known as SNC Demo-1, was planned for 2021. However, on November 17, 2020, SNC announced it would be delayed until early 2022.

In April 2021 SNC spun off its Dream Chaser division, creating the fully independent Sierra Space Corporation, which assumed responsibility for the further development of the Dream Chaser space vehicle system.

In May 2022, it was announced by the deputy manager of ISS, Dana Weigel, that the mission was scheduled for February 2023.

On November 2, 2023, SNC completed assembly of the first Dream Chaser vehicle, Tenacity.

In May 2024, it was announced that Dream Chaser Tenacity completed initial flight testing and was headed next to Kennedy Space Center to prepare for launch. It arrived later that month for launch preparation. The Vulcan Centaur to be used for the launch arrived to KSC in late June 2024. However, the Orlando Sentinel reports, June 26, "Dream Chaser dropped from next Vulcan launch as ULA targets national security certification". The mission was subsequently delayed to no earlier than May 2025, and had still not been scheduled for a specific date as of September 2025.

In September 2025, NASA announced that Dream Chaser's demonstration flight, SSC Demo-1, will no longer visit the ISS and was delayed to late 2026. The spacecraft is also no longer contracted to complete seven resupply missions to the ISS. The SSC Demo-1 flight has since been further delayed to no earlier than the second quarter of 2027.

== Variants ==
=== Crewed version ===
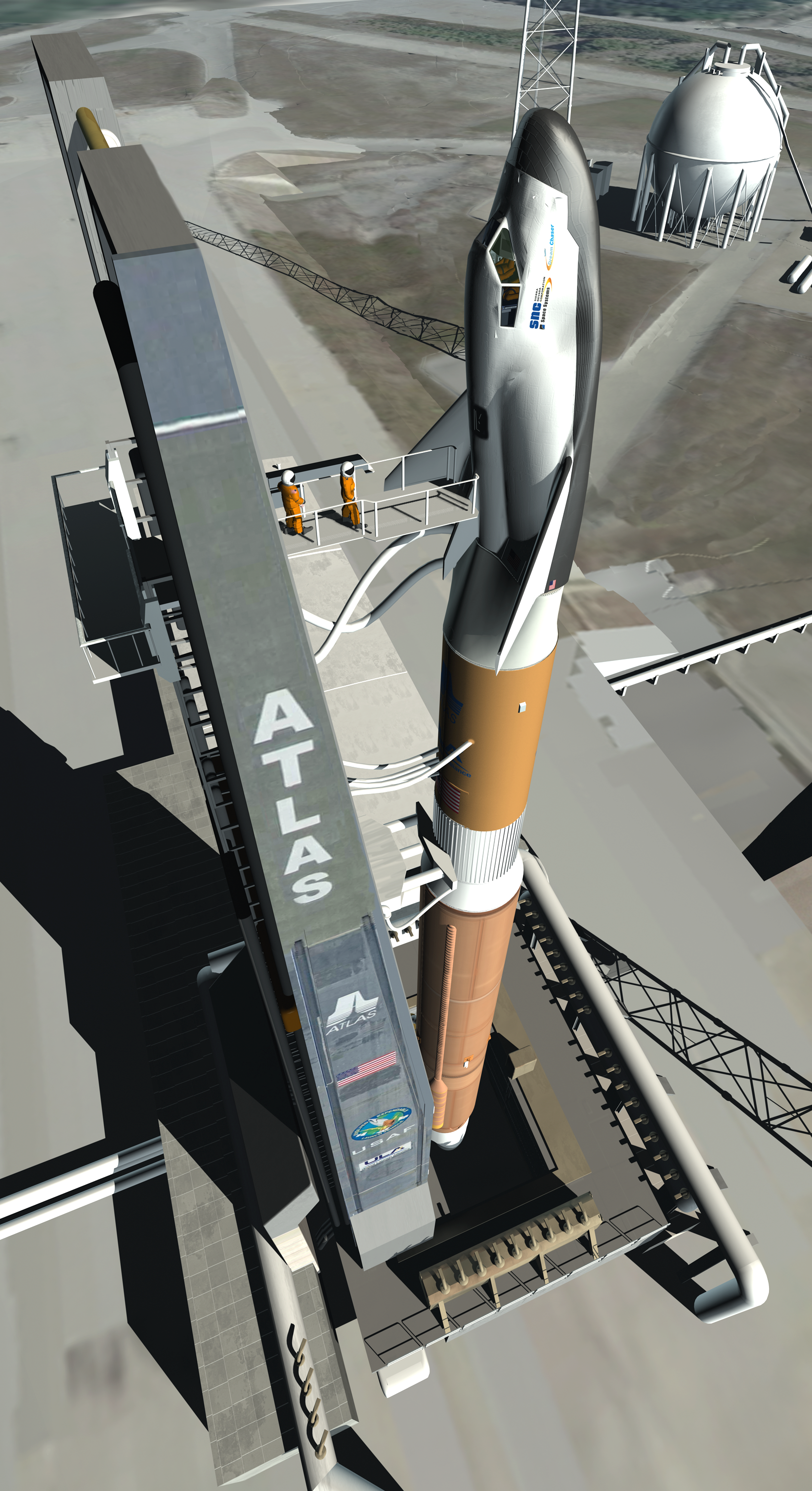
Artist's conception of the Dream Chaser Space System in the launch configuration of the Atlas V

The originally planned Dream Chaser Space System is a human-rated version designed to carry from three to seven people and cargo to orbital destinations such as the International Space Station. It was to have a built-in launch escape system and could fly autonomously if needed. Although it could use any suitable launch vehicle, it was planned to be launched on a human-rated Atlas V N12 rocket. The vehicle will be able to return from space by gliding (typically experiencing less than 1.5 g on re-entry) and landing on any airport runway that handles commercial air traffic. Its reaction control system thrusters burned ethanol-based fuel, which is not an explosively volatile material, nor toxic like hydrazine, allowing the Dream Chaser to be handled immediately after landing, unlike the Space Shuttle.

As of 2020, the Sierra Nevada Corporation said it still planned to produce a crewed version of the spacecraft within the next 5 years. The company said it "never stopped working" on the crewed version and fully intended to launch it after the cargo version, and is still committed to the crewed version as of 2021.

In November 2021, Sierra Space Corporation reported that it received a $1.4 billion investment in Series A funding, which it would use to develop a crewed version of Dream Chaser and fly astronauts by 2025, although this ultimately did not occur. On October 25, 2021, Blue Origin and Sierra Space, released their plan for a commercial space station. The station, called Orbital Reef, is intended as a "mixed-use business park". Sierra Space Corporation's Dream Chaser was chosen as one of the commercial spacecraft to transport commercial crew to and from the space station, along with Boeing's Starliner.

=== CRS-2 cargo version ===
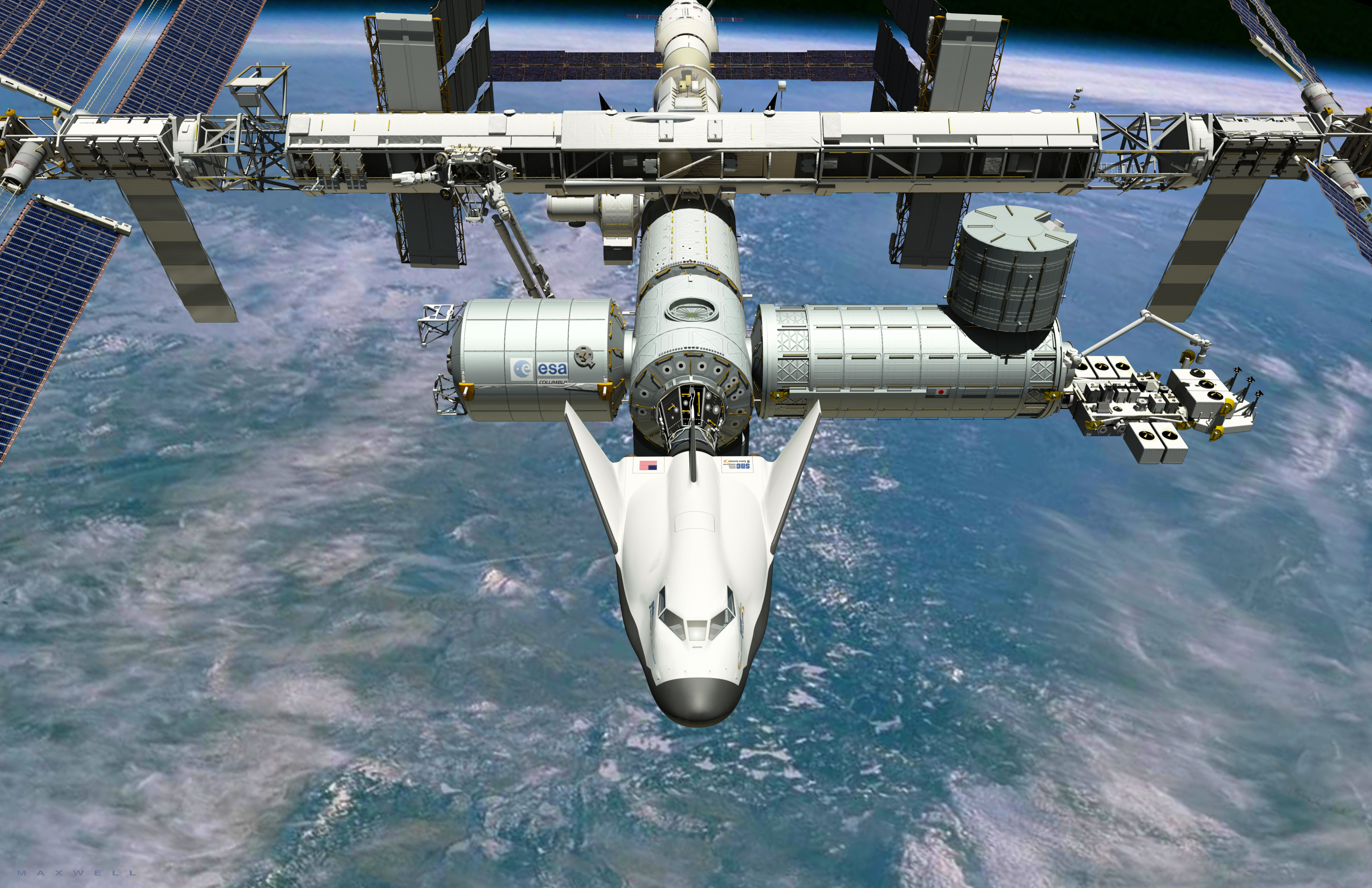
Artist's conception of the crewed Dream Chaser docked to International Space Station

The cargo version of the SSC Dream Chaser is called the Dream Chaser Cargo System (DCCS) and after development is completed, will fly resupply flights to the ISS under NASA's Commercial Resupply Services-2 program. Featuring an expendable cargo module mounting solar panels, the spacecraft will be capable of returning 1,750 kg (3,860 lb) to Earth while undergoing maximum re-entry forces of 1.5G.

To meet CRS-2 guidelines, the cargo Dream Chaser will have folding wings and fit within a 5 m diameter payload fairing, in contrast to the Crewed Dream Chaser, which is intended to launch without a fairing. The ability to fit into a payload fairing allows the cargo version to launch on any sufficiently capable vehicle, such as the (retired) Ariane 5 as well as the (soon to be retired) Atlas V. An expendable cargo module will launch attached to the back of the spacecraft, expanding the cargo uplift capacity and supporting the disposal of up to 3,250 kg (7,170 lb) of trash. Total uplift is planned for 5,000 kg (11,000 lb) pressurized and 500 kg (1,100 lb) unpressurized, with a downlift of 1,750 kg (3,860 lb) contained within the spaceplane. The expendable cargo module is called "Shooting Star".

On August 14, 2019, it was announced that all six Dream Chaser CRS-2 flights would be carried into orbit by ULA's Vulcan launch vehicle, with the first Dream Chaser flight being the second Vulcan flight in late 2021. However, on February 9, 2022, Ken Shields, Sierra Space's Director of Commercial Market Development, announced that the first flight would be pushed to January 2023. The launch has repeatedly been further delayed; as of October 2024, it was scheduled for no earlier than May 2025, as of February 2026, the mission was targeted to launch in late 2026, and as of November 2026, the mission was scheduled to launch in late 2027.

=== National Security version ===
On November 19, 2021, Sierra Space announced that it is considering a third Dream Chaser version specialized for National Security missions, though it declined to comment on what the differences compared with other versions would be.

== Dream Chaser Global Project ==
In December 2013, the German Aerospace Center (DLR) announced a funded study to investigate ways in which Europe might take advantage of the Dream Chaser crewed spaceplane technology. Named the DC4EU (Dream Chaser for European Utilization), the project will study using it for sending crews and cargo to the ISS and on missions not involving the ISS, particularly in orbits of substantially greater altitude than the ISS can reach.

In January 2014, the European Space Agency (ESA) agreed to be a partner on the DC4EU project, and will also investigate whether the Dream Chaser can use ESA avionics and docking mechanisms. ESA will also study launching options for the "Europeanized" Dream Chaser, particularly whether it can be launched from the Guiana Space Centre, within the Ariane 5's large aerodynamic cargo fairing – or, like the Atlas V, without it. In order to fit within the fairing, the Dream Chaser's wing length will have to be reduced slightly, which is thought to be easier than going through a full aerodynamic test program to evaluate and prove it along with the Ariane for flight without the fairing. The Ariane 5 launch vehicle was designed from its inception to be crew rated, in order to launch the Hermes Spaceplane, an ESA crewed vehicle which was proposed in the 1980s and 1990s, but was cancelled.

In late January 2014, it was announced that the Dream Chaser orbital test vehicle was under contract to be launched on an initial orbital test flight, using an Atlas V rocket, from Kennedy Space Center in November 2016. This was a privately arranged commercial agreement, and was funded directly by Sierra Nevada and was not a part of any existing NASA contract.

In September 2014, SNC announced that it would, with global partners, use the Dream Chaser as the baseline spacecraft for orbital access for a variety of programs, specializing the craft as needed.

On November 5, 2014, SNC's Space Systems team publicly presented the challenges and opportunities related to landing the Dream Chaser spacecraft at public-use airports. Dream Chaser uses standard landing aids and non-toxic propellants that require no special handling.

=== Dream Chaser for European Utilization ===
On February 3, 2015, the Sierra Nevada Corporation's (SNC) Space Systems and OHB System AG (OHB) in Germany announced the completion of the initial Dream Chaser for European Utilization (DC4EU) study. The study found that Dream Chaser is suitable for a broad range of space applications and could be used to advance European interests in space. The cooperation was renewed in April 2015 for an additional two years.

=== United Nations ===
The United Nations Office for Outer Space Affairs (UNOOSA) selected the cargo Dream Chaser for its first space launch. This launch is intended to last for at least two weeks in freeflight to provide space access to United Nations member states that have no space programs of their own, and carry up to 35 payloads. The United States will pay for the mission and provide all support facilities.

== List of vehicles ==
Test vehicle Spaceflight vehicle

Type	Serial	Name	Status	Flights	Time in flight	Notes
Prototype	ETA	Eagle	Retired	4	~5 minutes	Engineering Test Article (ETA) used for captive carry and atmospheric drop tests
Prototype	FTA	Ascension	Active	0	None	Flight Test Article (FTA) to be used for atmospheric tests
Cargo	DC101	Tenacity	Active	0	None	Spacecraft to be flown on SSC Demo-1 mission.
Cargo	DC102	Reverence	Under construction	0	None	Construction on hold as of November 2024; company estimates 18 months of work remain.

=== Mockups ===
Name	Location	Status	Notes
Dream Chaser	Wings Over the Rockies Air and Space Museum	On Display	Replica of a crewed Dream Chaser spaceplane. Originally constructed in 1990 as an HL-20 mockup prior to the program's cancellation.
Tenacity	Kennedy Space Center Visitor Complex	On Display	Replica of Tenacity mated to Shooting Star module. Located in Gateway section of the complex.

== Missions ==
A demonstration and six missions are currently planned to be launched from Cape Canaveral SLC-41 on Vulcan Centaur, and one more flight has been ordered to fly for the United Nations on board an Arianespace vehicle.

List includes only completed or manifested missions. NET means 'no earlier than'. Launch and landing dates and times are listed in UTC.

Mission	Spacecraft	Launch	Landing	Launch vehicle	Remarks	Outcome
Captive Test 1	ETA Eagle	May 29, 2012	May 29, 2012	Erickson Skycrane (Note: A helicopter used for lifting the vehicle)	1st atmospheric test	Success
Captive Test 2	ETA Eagle	August 22, 2013	August 22, 2013	Erickson Skycrane	2nd atmospheric test	Success
Drop Test 1	ETA Eagle	October 26, 2013	October 26, 2013	Erickson Skycrane	1st free flight test	Partial success
Drop Test 2	ETA Eagle	November 11, 2017	November 11, 2017	Boeing-Vertol 234	2nd free flight test	Success
SSC Demo-1	DC101 Tenacity	NET Late 2027	NET Late 2027	Vulcan Centaur	First orbital flight, originally an approximately 45-day ISS resupply mission, now will not visit the ISS.	Planned
CRS SSC-1	DC101 Tenacity	TBA	TBA	Vulcan Centaur	1st contracted CRS mission for NASA	Cancelled
CRS SSC-2	DC101 Tenacity	TBA	TBA	Vulcan Centaur	2nd contracted CRS mission for NASA	Cancelled
CRS SSC-3	DC101 Tenacity	TBA	TBA	Vulcan Centaur	3rd contracted CRS mission for NASA	Cancelled
CRS SSC-4	DC102 Reverence	TBA	TBA	Vulcan Centaur	4th contracted CRS mission for NASA	Cancelled
CRS SSC-5	TBA	TBA	TBA	Vulcan Centaur	5th contracted CRS mission for NASA	Cancelled
CRS SSC-6	TBA	TBA	TBA	Vulcan Centaur	6th contracted CRS mission for NASA	Cancelled
DC UNOOSA-1	TBA	TBA	TBA	Arianespace vehicle	To carry 35 payloads for the United Nations Office for Outer Space Affairs.	Planned

== See also ==
Spaceplanes

- RLV Technology Demonstration Programme – Indian reusable rocket programme
- Boeing X-37 – Reusable robotic spaceplane used by US military since 2010
- Space Rider – Planned ESA uncrewed spaceplane
- NASA X-38 – NASA experimental re-entry vehicle
- Boeing X-20 Dyna-Soar
- Mikoyan-Gurevich MiG-105 – Soviet cancelled spaceplane project
- Hermes (spacecraft) – French crewed spaceplane concept (1975–1992)
- RSC Energia Kliper

Other ISS cargo vehicles:

- Comparison of space station cargo vehicles
- Commercial Resupply Services
- Automated Transfer Vehicle
- Cygnus (spacecraft)
- SpaceX Dragon 1
- SpaceX Dragon 2
- H-II Transfer Vehicle
- Progress (spacecraft)
- Soyuz GVK

Other ISS crew vehicles:

- Commercial Crew Development
- Boeing Starliner
- SpaceX Crew Dragon
- Orel (spacecraft)
- Soyuz (spacecraft)
