= Sierra Nevada Freedom =

Sierra Nevada Freedom is a proposed military training aircraft. It is a contender for the U.S. Navy.

Other contending aircraft include the Beech version of the M-346. Boeing has withdrawn from the competition as has Lockheed.

== See also ==
Sierra Nevada Corporation
