= AdamWorks =

American engineering company

ADAMWORKS, LLC
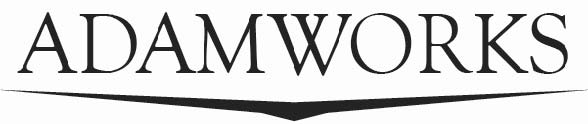
- Type: Privatized Corporation
- Industry: Aerospace
- Genre: Engineering/Manufacturing
- Founded: September 25, 2007; 19 years ago
- Founder: George F. Adam Jr., Kim Madigan
- Headquarters: Centennial, Colorado, USA
- Area served: Worldwide
- Key people: Kim Madigan, CEO; SCOT ALLEN, President
- Products: Design Engineering; Engineering of Composite Structures; Metal and Composite Tooling; Composite and Metal Part Manufacturing; Radomes; Pod Systems; Aircraft structures Spacecraft structures
- Website: www.adamworksinc.com

AdamWorks, LLC (AdamWorks), is an American engineering and manufacturing organization specializing in designing, tooling and manufacturing of composite structures and mechanical systems.

== History ==
The company was founded in 2007 to pursue composites engineering/manufacturing projects in government, defense, space, commercial, and alternative energy markets.

Since its inception, AdamWorks has designed and built a variety of spacecraft pressure vessels, aerospace and aircraft structures, radomes, pods and pod systems, unmanned aerial vehicle structures, with a portfolio of products flying on over 17 different military and civilian aircraft.

== Services ==
- Engineering
- Tooling
- Design and Manufacture
- Build to print structures
- Reverse engineering
- Rapid prototyping
- Static Testing
- Production engineering
- Production manufacturing

== Projects ==
- UAV Sensor Pod Design and Fabrication to support Wide Area Airborne Sensor (WAAS) Integration, including full Environmental Control System (ECS) integration
- Tooling Design, Fabrication, Parts Design and Fabrication for Primary Structure for a suborbital spacecraft funded under NASA's Commercial Orbital Transportation Services (COTS) and Commercial Crew Development (CCDev) Initiative
- Design, tooling, and manufacture of a Multi-Sensor Fairing Assembly housing a multi-spectral sensor integrated onto a Boeing 700-series test bed aircraft
- Radomes, Composite Pallets, Operator Workstations, and Airborne Server rack integration supporting conversion of a cargo aircraft into an ISR platform
- Fabrication of sub-orbital space vehicle pressure vessel for the Space Tourism Industry
- DARPA-funded man-portable wind-generator power project
- Structural engineering services for composite compound coaxial Joint Multi-Role demonstrator helicopter designed by prime contractor (AVX Aircraft Company) for the US Army's Future Vertical Lift initiative

== Milestones ==
- AdamWorks receives its ISO 9001:2008 certification in 2011.
- Facility Expansion (2011)
- Delivery of Dream Chaser flight test vehicle (12/11/2011)
- AdamWorks is a Finalist for Colorado Companies To Watch (April, 2013)
