= Soyuz GVK =

Planned retrievable cargo spacecraft

Soyuz GVK (Союз ГВК)
- Manufacturer: Energia
- Country of origin: Russia
- Operator: Russian Federal Space Agency
- Applications: Space station resupply

Specifications
- Spacecraft type: Cargo spacecraft
- Launch mass: Up to 8,020kg
- Payload capacity: 2,000kg
- Crew capacity: 0
- Dimensions: 2.70m width, 7.23m span
- Regime: Low Earth orbit
- Design life: 30 Days (Free flight), 370 Days (Docked to Space station)

Production
- Status: In Development
- Maiden launch: Currently Unknown; Originally planned for 2022

Related spacecraft
- Derived from: Soyuz MS

The Soyuz GVK is a Russian uncrewed cargo spacecraft currently under development. Its first flight was expected to occur in 2022; however, this has not happened. Like the uncrewed Progress cargo spacecraft, the Soyuz GVK is based on the crewed Soyuz spacecraft. However, the Soyuz GVK will be capable of returning to Earth and bringing cargo back, whereas the Progress burns up in Earth's atmosphere at the end of its mission. The only other resupply spacecraft capable of bringing cargo down from orbit is the SpaceX Dragon 2 cargo spacecraft. The Soyuz GVK will be able to deliver 2,000 kg to orbit and return 500 kg to Earth.

It is planned to launch aboard a Soyuz 2.1b booster.
