= Arthur M. Dula =

American lawyer

Arthur M. ("Art") Dula (born February 6, 1947, in Arlington, Virginia) is a space lawyer, a patent attorney, the literary executor for major science fiction author Robert A. Heinlein and chairman, founder of the private spaceflight company, Excalibur Almaz.

Art Dula's law practice focuses on aerospace and intellectual property law, technology licensing, business start-up and development, patents, contracts, corporations, securities, copyrights and trademarks. His clients include U.S. and Russian aerospace firms. He is admitted to practice before the U.S. Supreme Court, the U.S. Patent and Trademark Office, and Texas State and Federal Courts. He is also a registered broker with US State Department, Bureau of Political-Military Affairs, Office of Defense Trade Controls.

Since 1980, Art Dula has co-founded several aerospace companies. Eagle Aerospace provided engineering expertise for NASA and U.S. aerospace companies. Space Services, Inc., secured the first US regulatory approval of a private space launch. In 1982, it launched the first private U.S. space vehicle, the Conestoga, from Matagorda Island, Texas. Spacehab, Inc., builds payload bay Spacehab modules for the U.S. Space Shuttle. Space Commerce Corporation was the first U.S.-Russian aerospace joint venture. It sold a Soviet Proton rocket launch to Hughes Aerospace in 1987, and marketed remote sensing radar images. Tethers Unlimited, Inc., won seven patents on space tether systems, and secured over $2 million in research contracts. Starcraft Boosters, Inc., has contracts with US Air Force and NASA for the StarBooster launching system. Excalibur Almaz, Ltd., owns several Almaz Space System space capsules and space stations, and intended to begin launching its spacecraft as early as 2013.

Art Dula is literary executor for the major science fiction writer, Robert A. Heinlein. He also serves as Trustee of the Robert A. and Virginia Heinlein Prize Trust. In 2006, the Trust awarded the first Heinlein Prize, in the amount of $500,000, to Peter Diamandis, for outstanding personal initiative and significant progress in commercial space activities.

He has taught space law for the University of Houston, and was a Visiting Distinguished Professor of Law, University of Akron. He consulted NASA on the Space Shuttle payload contract, and served as legal advisor to the U.S. Congress, Office of Technology Assessment. He has been awarded the Space Pioneer Award from the National Space Society, and the Gagarin Medal from the Russian Federation of Cosmonautics.

== Controversies ==
A 2012 lawsuit alleged that Dula improperly lost US$300,000 of Donna Beck's investment in an asteroid mining project. The lawsuit was dismissed in January 2014.

A lawsuit was filed in 2014 against Dula by Japanese entrepreneur Takafumi Horie, alleging Horie was duped into investing US$49 million into a now-defunct " space travel company, using Russian-made Almaz spacecraft". This lawsuit was dismissed in 2017, and the subsequent appeal was denied.

== Personal life ==
Dula was born February 6, 1947, in Arlington, Virginia. He received a bachelor's degree in chemistry and mathematics, from Eastern New Mexico University, in 1970, and his Juris Doctor, in civil law, from Tulane University, in 1975. He is married to Tamea A. Dula. They live in Houston, Texas. They have two sons.
