= Excalibur Almaz =

Defunct private spaceflight company

- Type: Private
- Industry: Aerospace
- Founded: 2005
- Defunct: 2016
- Headquarters: Douglas, Isle of Man
- Key people: Arthur M. Dula (CEO)
- Website: excaliburalmaz.com

Excalibur Almaz Limited was a privately-held commercial spaceflight company headquartered in the Isle of Man. The company was founded in 2005 and went defunct in 2016.

== History ==
Excalibur Almaz had its headquarters in Douglas, Isle of Man, with offices in Houston, Los Angeles, Moscow, and Tokyo. The company planned to provide a variety of deep space crewed exploration missions, micro-gravity science, and payload delivery. EA also aimed to offer Low Earth Orbit cargo and crew delivery and return.

In 2009, Excalibur Almaz hoped to begin flights by 2012 with revenue flights starting as early as 2013.

In October 2011, NASA signed an unfunded Space Act Agreement for work related to the Commercial Crew Development program. In July 2012, Excalibur Almaz Inc. (EAI) successfully completed its Commercial Crew Development Round 2 (CCDev2) partnership with NASA's Commercial Crew Program.

In 2010, Jonathan Clark, NASA flight surgeon on six Space Shuttle missions—and whose wife, Laurel Clark, died in the Space Shuttle Columbia disaster on shuttle mission STS-107—was a consultant on space suit and crew biological environment design for Excalibur Almaz.

In January 2012, Excalibur Almaz updated its mission service offerings to include lunar and deep space capabilities. Based on independent market studies, these missions beyond Low Earth Orbit will provide the best business opportunity for commercial space transportation companies. Because of these more ambitious service offerings, Excalibur Almaz had pushed back its first launch to 2015.

In June 2012, Excalibur Almaz signed an agreement with XCOR Aerospace for suborbital familiarisation and flight training services.

In 2012, plans, design and flight safety reviews were planned for 2015. According to a 2012 interview with Art Dula, the chairman of Excalibur Almaz, the Excalibur Almaz capsule was supposedly at a "very high level of technical readiness" and could be flown within two to three years. The main issue of the first crewed flight of the Excalibur Almaz capsule was regulatory, according to Dula, as the VA capsule had already completed nine uncrewed test flights during the Almaz program, all of which were successful. The company had entered into an unfunded Space Act Agreement with NASA as part of the Commercial Crew Development Round 2 (CCDev2) activities in 2011, but was not selected to receive funding under any phases of it.

In March 2016, plans were announced to have the equipment converted into an educational exhibit, owing to lack of funds.

However, the company still exists as Excalibur Almaz Limited.

== Company ==
Excalibur Almaz is based in Douglas, Isle of Man.

== Operations ==
=== Spacecraft ===
Excalibur Almaz was designing a spacecraft based on the VA capsule hull from the TKS spacecraft. The VA is a space capsule from the Soviet space program, originally designed for the military Almaz space station program. The needed development of propulsion systems for the VA capsule was reportedly delegated to a then undisclosed European organisation as early as 2009. While the needed service module for an Excalibur Almaz capsule would have superficially resemble the FGB of the TKS spacecraft, it is based on Astrium's ATV design according to Art Dula, the chairman of Excalibur Almaz.

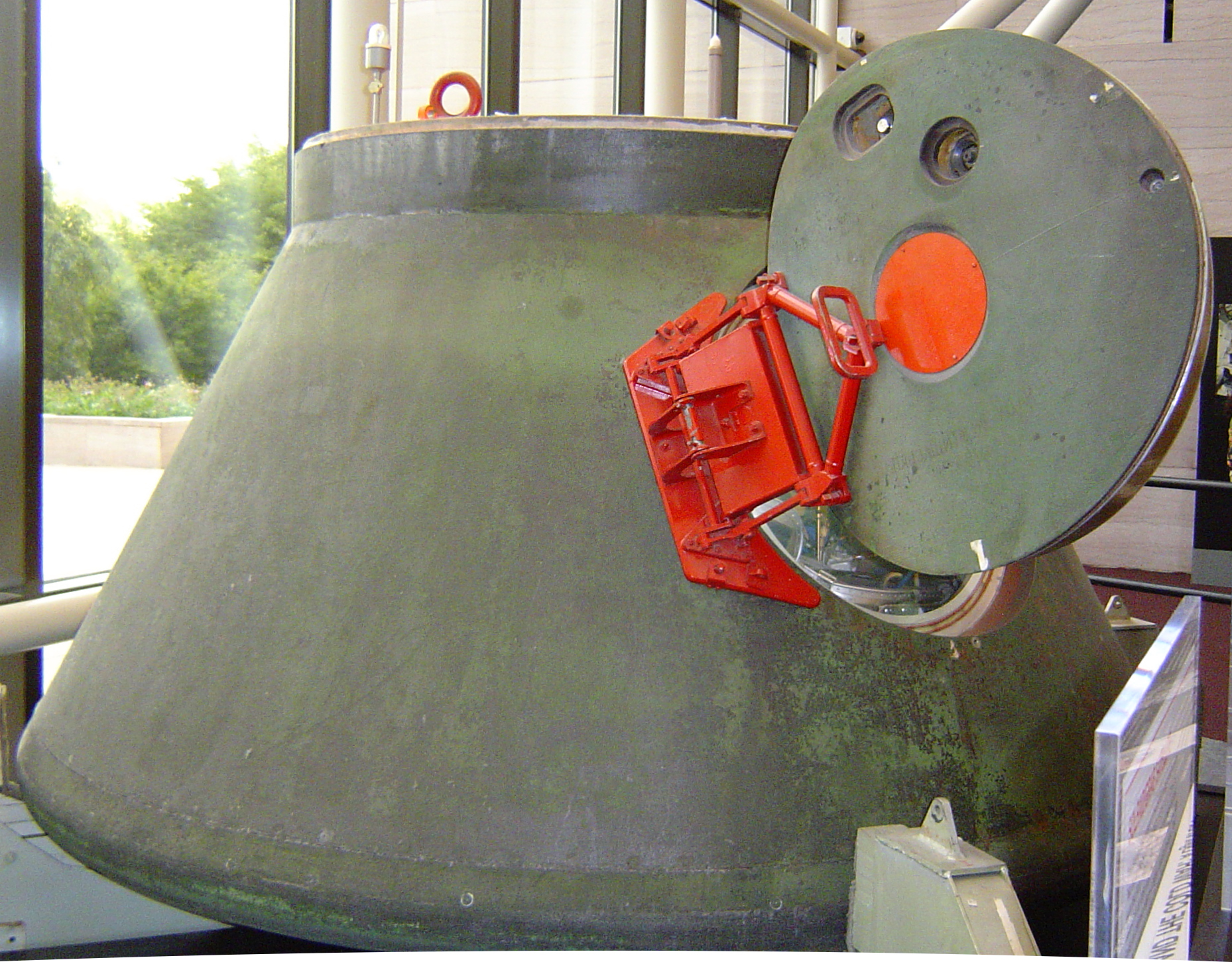
The VA capsule of a TKS spacecraft.

Drawing of a TKS spacecraft – the VA capsule is the conical section on the left.

The potential Excalibur Almaz stations was to use two hulls from the Almaz space station program. The company's Soviet-era spacecraft were moved from Russia to Excalibur Almaz facilities on the Isle of Man in early 2011. EA "planned to use the modules to provide extra room and supplies for the tourists and researchers it hoped to ferry into space." Excalibur Almaz's two Salyut-class 29-ton space stations, each with a capacity of 95 cubic meters will serve as the heart of its lunar and deep space capabilities. The Soviet-era electronics have been completely gutted and supposedly replaced with modern avionics supplied from an unnamed company.

By using modernised, tried-and-tested equipment rather than developing technology from scratch, the project was reportedly saving around $2 billion in development costs. The Russian Proton rocket, launched from the Baikonur Cosmodrome in Kazakhstan, was intended to be used to launch one of the spacecraft into space, where it would have remained. Astronauts were to use the Excalibur Almaz RRVs to get to and from the spacecraft.

=== Training ===
Excalibur Almaz had established a 2012 agreement with XCOR Aerospace to provide a suite of suborbital flight experiences as training milestones in preparation for orbital and trans-lunar missions.

=== Space launch services ===
In 2010, Excalibur Almaz partnered with Space Launch Services (SLS) to finance Sea Launch's preparations to emerge from Chapter 11 with US$12 million of debtor-in-possession (DIP) financing to provide investment in a financial reorganisation of Sea Launch. SLS earlier provided $12.5 million of DIP funds to Sea Launch in December 2009.

== Company's problems ==
A secondhand Soviet-era space capsule that launched into space twice was set to be sold in Belgium on 2014-05-07. The Russian VA (Vozvraschaemyi Apparat, return vehicle) crew and cargo spacecraft was offered by the Berlin-based Lempertz auction house at its newly opened gallery in Brussels. The capsule was said to be the first historic spacecraft to be put up for sale in Europe. The VA capsule was sold to Excalibur Almaz (EA), a British company that planned to reuse the Soviet artefacts to offer commercial spaceflight services. In total, EA acquired four VA capsules and two Almaz (Salyut) modules in hopes of flying the combined spacecraft as a crew and cargo transportation system to the Moon, the asteroids and deep space. The VA spacecraft being offered still bears the Excalibur Almaz name and logo, as well as the flags of Russia, the United Kingdom, the Isle of Man and the United States. It was sold to an anonymous bidder for 1 million euro.

In September 2013 Dula, J. Buckner Hightower and Excalibur Almaz Ltd. were brought to court under the charges of fraud of $300,000 for the planned asteroid mining project. The case ended with conciliation in January 2014.

In November 2014 Art Dula, Dula's law office associate Anat Friedman, his business partner J. Buckner Hightower, The Robert A. and Virginia Heinlein Prize Trust, Excalibur Limited, Excalibur Almaz Limited and Excalibur Almaz USA Inc were all sued by Japanese entrepreneur Takafumi Horie for fraud. The amount mentioned was $49 million, allegedly provided by Takafumi to run the company. It is alleged that some of the money was spent to buy Soviet hardware, which, as the businessman states, turned out to be "museum specimens". Some of the money was also transferred into Dula's own name. Other alleged irregularities included reducing Takafumi's shareholding percentage.

In March 2015 one of the two hulls of Soviet-built Almaz space stations, along with the remaining VA capsule, was shipped to the Isle of Man's seaport. The destination of the hardware remained unknown until it was moved to the Isle of Man Motor Museum in 2021.

In August 2023, Isle of Man Today reported that Excalibur Almaz sought security for costs in its long running dispute with Japanese entrepreneur Takafumi Horie. The court ordered Horie to pay £30,000 into court as security for the claimants’ costs, rejecting a substantially larger amount sought by the company.

In May 2025, Isle of Man Today reported that the dispute was settled out of court shortly before a scheduled Manx High Court trial. According to the report, Horie discontinued his claim and agreed to pay £30,000 to Excalibur Almaz’s costs, after which Excalibur Almaz withdrew its claims.
