= Salyut 2 =

Failed Soviet space station (1973)

Salyut 2 (OPS-1)

Station statistics
- COSPAR ID: 1973-017A
- SATCAT no.: 06398
- Call sign: Salyut 2
- Crew: 3
- Launch: 3 April 1973; 09:00:00 UTC
- Launch pad: Baikonur Site 81/23
- Reentry: 28 May 1973
- Mass: 18,500 kilograms (40,800 lb)
- Length: 14.55 metres (47.7 ft)
- Diameter: 4.15 metres (13.6 ft)
- Pressurised volume: 99 cubic metres (3,500 cu ft)
- Periapsis altitude: 257 kilometres (160 mi)
- Apoapsis altitude: 278 kilometres (173 mi)
- Orbital inclination: 51.6°
- Orbital period: 89.8 minutes
- Days in orbit: 54 days
- No. of orbits: 866
- Distance travelled: 35,163,530 kilometres (21,849,600 mi)
- Statistics as of 4 April 1973
- Configuration
- An Almaz space station

Salyut 2 (OPS-1) (Russian: Салют-2 meaning Salute 2) was a Soviet space station which was launched in 1973 as part of the Salyut programme. It was the first Almaz military space station to fly. Within two weeks of its launch, the station had lost altitude control and depressurized, leaving it unusable. Its orbit decayed and it re-entered the atmosphere on 28 May 1973, without any crews having visited it.

== Spacecraft ==
Salyut 2 was an Almaz military space station. It was designated part of the Salyut programme in order to conceal the existence of the two separate space station programmes.

Salyut 2 was 14.55 metres (47.7 ft) long with a diameter of 4.15 metres (13.6 ft), and had an internal habitable volume of 90 cubic metres (3,200 cu ft). At launch it had a mass of 18,950 kilograms (41,780 lb). A single aft-mounted docking port was intended for use by Soyuz spacecraft carrying cosmonauts to work aboard the station. Two solar arrays mounted at the aft end of the station near the docking port provided power to the station, generating a total of 3,120 watts of electricity. The station was equipped with 32 attitude control thrusters, as well as two RD-0225 engines, each capable of generating 3.9 kilonewtons (880 lb_{f}) of thrust, for orbital manoeuvres.

== Launch ==
Salyut 2 was launched from Site 81/23 at the Baikonur Cosmodrome, atop a three-stage Proton-K rocket, serial number 283-01. The launch took place at 09:00:00 UTC on 3 April 1973, and successfully placed Salyut 2 into low Earth orbit. Upon reaching orbit, Salyut 2 was assigned the International Designator 1973-017A, whilst NORAD gave it the Satellite Catalog Number 06398. The third stage (8S812) of the Proton-K rocket entered orbit along with Salyut 2. On 4 April, it was catalogued in a 192 by 238 kilometres (119 by 148 mi) orbit, inclined at 51.4 degrees.

== Failure ==
Three days after the launch of Salyut 2, the Proton's spent third stage exploded, due to pressure changes within the tanks. This explosion resulted in a cloud of debris, some of which followed a similar trajectory to the station. Ten days later this debris struck the station, damaging the hull and causing depressurization. Both solar panels were torn free, removing the ability of the station to generate power and control its altitude.

Three pieces of debris from the station were catalogued, and had decayed from orbit by 13 May. The remainder of the station reentered the atmosphere on 28 May 1973 over the Pacific Ocean.

An inquiry into the failure initially determined that a fuel line had burst, burning a hole in the station. The damage from the debris collision was only discovered later.

== Fidel Castro tour ==
When First Secretary of the Communist Party of Cuba Fidel Castro was in the Soviet Union as part of a whirlwind tour in 1972, General Secretary of the Communist Party of the Soviet Union Leonid Brezhnev brought Fidel Castro to the Gagarin Cosmonaut Training Centre. Fidel Castro was photographed inside both the Soyuz docking trainer and the Salyut-2 (OPS-1/Almaz) military space station.

== See also ==
- Salyut
- TKS spacecraft
- Almaz
- Mir
- Skylab
- International Space Station
