= Gamma (satellite) =

Soviet gamma ray telescope

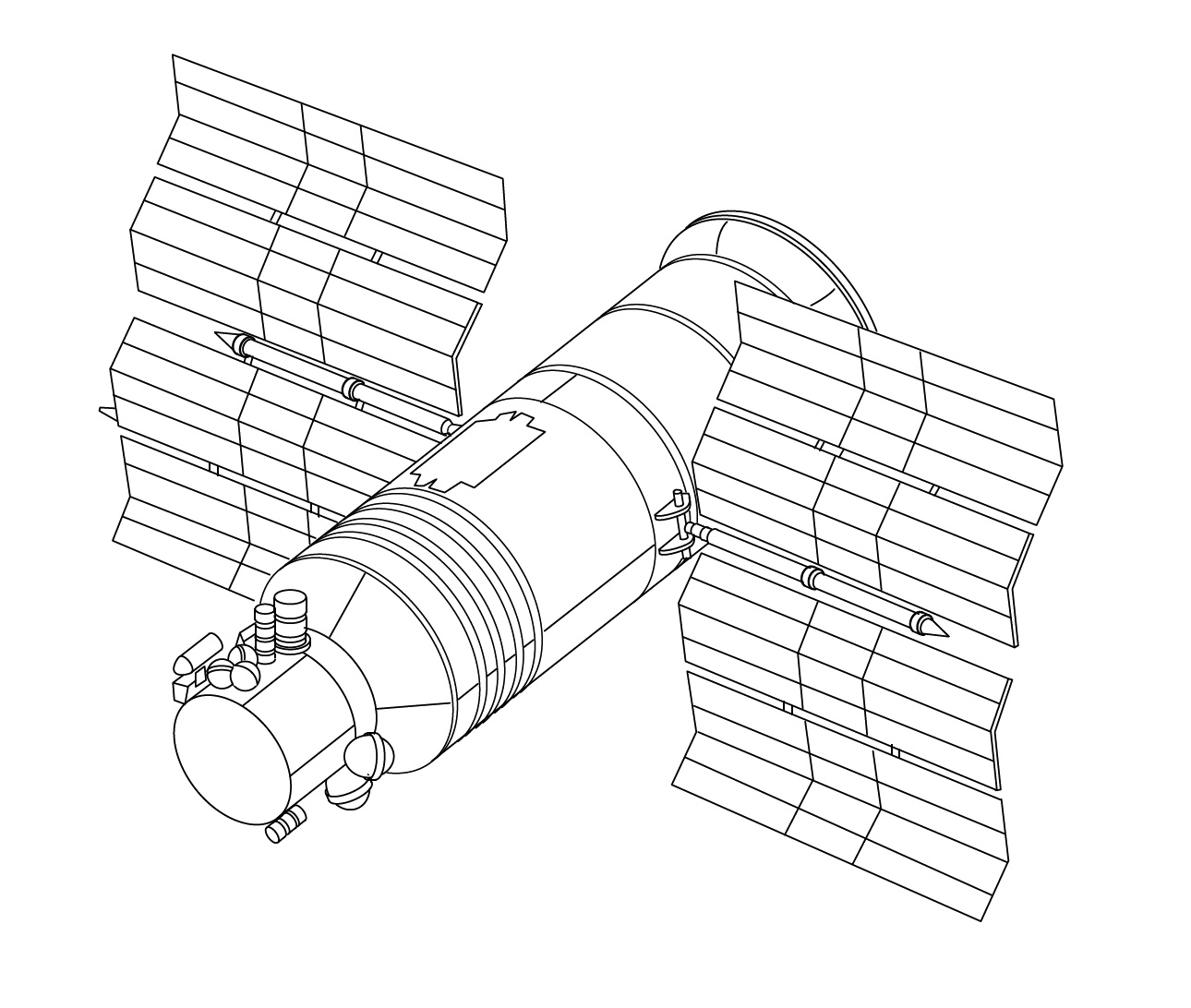
- Drawing of the Gamma space telescope satellite. The spaceframe and subsystems of the satellite were based on the Progress spacecraft
- Operator: RKA
- COSPAR ID: 1990-058A
- SATCAT no.: 20683
- Mission duration: 2 years

Spacecraft properties
- Bus: Soyuz
- Launch mass: 7,350 kg (16,200 lb)

Start of mission
- Launch date: July 11, 1990
- Rocket: Soyuz-U2
- Launch site: Baikonur Site 1/5

End of mission
- Decay date: February 28, 1992

Orbital parameters
- Eccentricity: 0.00326
- Perigee altitude: 190 km
- Apogee altitude: 233 km
- Inclination: 51.6°
- Period: 88.45 min

Main telescope
- Wavelengths: Gamma ray

Instruments
- Gamma-1 telescope (50 MeV to 6 GeV); Disk-M telescope (20 keV to 5 MeV); Pulsar X-2 telescope (2–25 keV)

Gamma was a Soviet gamma ray telescope. It was launched on 11 July 1990 into an orbit around Earth with a height of 375 km and an inclination of 51.6 degrees. It lasted for around 2 years. On board the mission were three telescopes, all of which could be pointed at the same source. The project was a joint Soviet-French project.

== Background ==
The Gamma-1 telescope was the main telescope. It consisted of 2 scintillation counters and a gas Cerenkov counter. With an effective area of around 0.2 square metres (2.2 sq ft), it operated in the energy range of 50 MeV to 6 GeV. At 100 MeV it initially had an angular resolution of 1.5 degrees, with a field of view of 5 degrees and an energy resolution of 12%. A Telezvezda star tracker increased the pointing position accuracy of the Gamma-1 telescope to 2 arcminutes by tracking stars up to an apparent magnitude of 5 within its 6 by 6 degree field of view. However, due to the failure of power to a spark chamber, for most of the mission the resolution was around 10 degrees.

The telescope was conceived in 1965, as part of the Soviet Cloud Space Station, which evolved into the Multi-module Orbital Complex (MOK). When work on Gamma finally began in 1972, it was intended to create a Gamma observatory, the first space station module for MOK, the first modular space station in the Salyut programme. For this, it was designed to add the scientific instruments of the observatory to a spacecraft derived from the Progress spacecraft – with the Progress in turn being a Soyuz spacecraft derivate – and that this spacecraft would dock to a MOK space station. However, in 1974, at the time it became a joint venture with France, the MOK space station project was canceled, and in February 1976, the Soviet space program was reconfigured. When on 16 February 1979 production of the telescope was authorized, the plans for the Soviet space station modules had evolved to use the Functional Cargo Block of the TKS spacecraft instead, with the Kvant-1 Roentgen observatory eventually becoming the first such module for Mir – as a result of these changes the Gamma observatory was redesigned as the free flying Gamma satellite. At that time the telescope was authorized in 1979, it was planned to be launched in 1984, but the actual launch was delayed until 1990.

== Operation ==
The Disk-M telescope operated in the energy range 20 keV – 5 MeV. It consisted of Sodium iodide scintillation crystals, and had an angular resolution of 25 arcminutes. However, it stopped working shortly after the mission was launched.

Finally, the Pulsar X-2 telescope had 30 arcminute resolution and a 10 deg x 10 deg field of view, and operated in the energy range 2–25 keV.

Observations included studies of the Vela Pulsar, the Galactic Center, Cygnus X-1, Hercules X-1 and the Crab Nebula. The telescopes also measured the Sun during peak solar activity.

== See also ==
- Aelita (spacecraft)
