= VA spacecraft =

Soviet space capsule

VA capsule
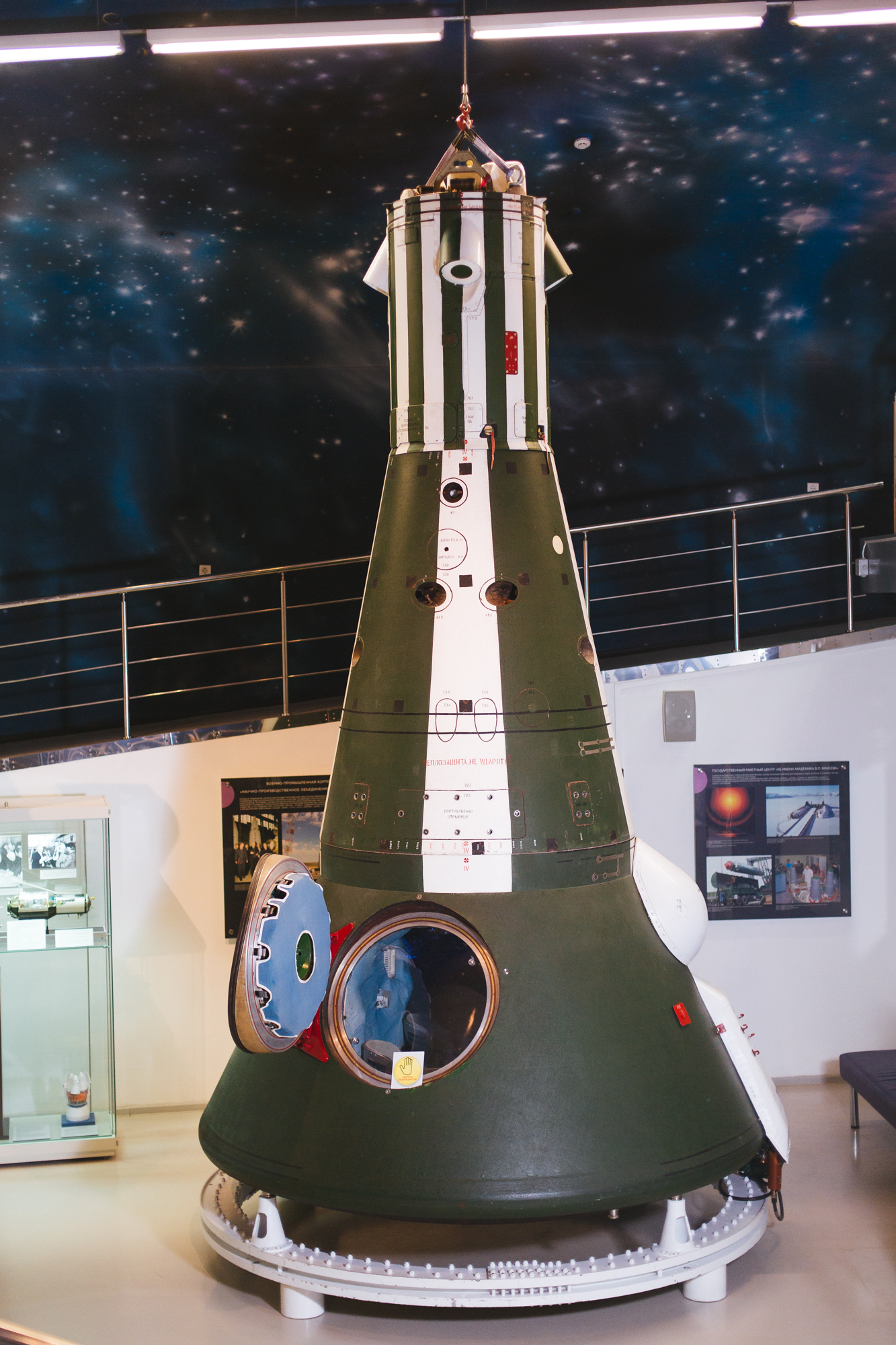
- VA capsule on display at the Collections of Memorial Museum of Cosmonautics
- Designer: Vladimir Chelomei

Specifications
- Launch mass: 7,300 kg (16,100 lb)
- Payload capacity: 2,135 kg (4,707 lb)
- Crew capacity: 3
- Volume: 8.37 m^{3} (296 cu ft)
- Regime: Low Earth orbit
- Design life: 7 days (free flight); 210 days (docked to station); 31 hours (disconnected from FGB)

Dimensions
- Length: 3.64 m (11 ft 11 in)
- Diameter: 2.79 m (9 ft 2 in)

Related spacecraft
- Flown with: Functional Cargo Block
- Launch vehicle: Proton-K

Configuration
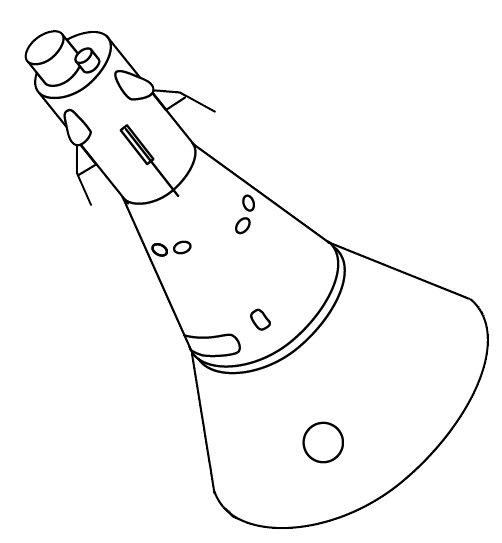
- A drawing of a VA spacecraft: The VA capsule is on the lower right, while the braking engines are located on top of the long "nose section". The launch escape system (not shown) would have been attached on top of the nose section.

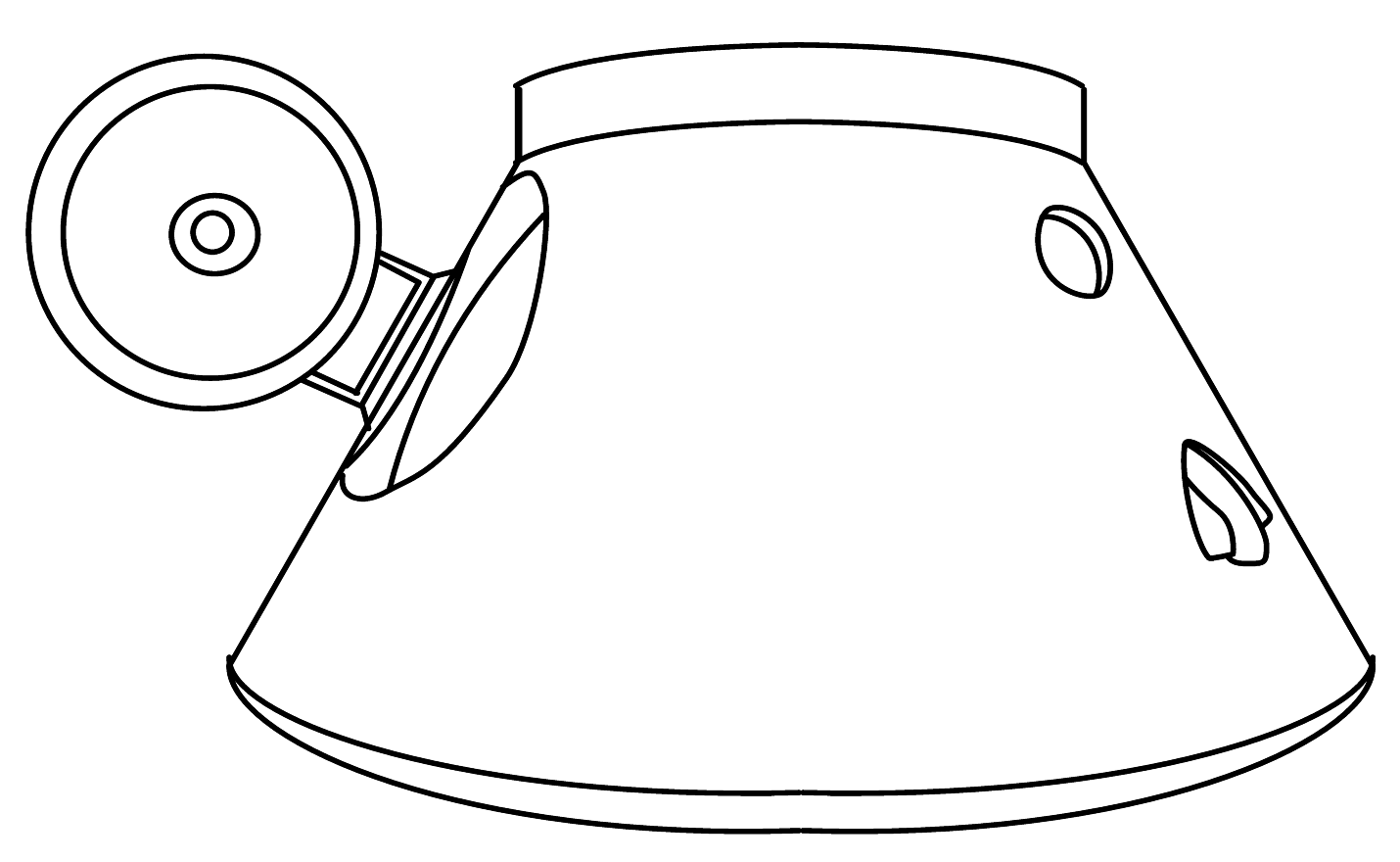
An isolated drawing of the VA capsule, the crew compartment of the VA spacecraft, with the side hatch opened.

The Vozvraschaemyi Apparat (VA, Russian: Возвращаемый Аппарат, lit. 'Return Vehicle', GRAU index 11F74) was a Soviet crew capsule, intended to serve as a crewed launch and reentry vehicle. Initially designed for the LK-1 human lunar flyby spacecraft for one of the Soviet crewed lunar programs, then the LK-700 redesign, it was later repurposed for the Almaz military space station program.

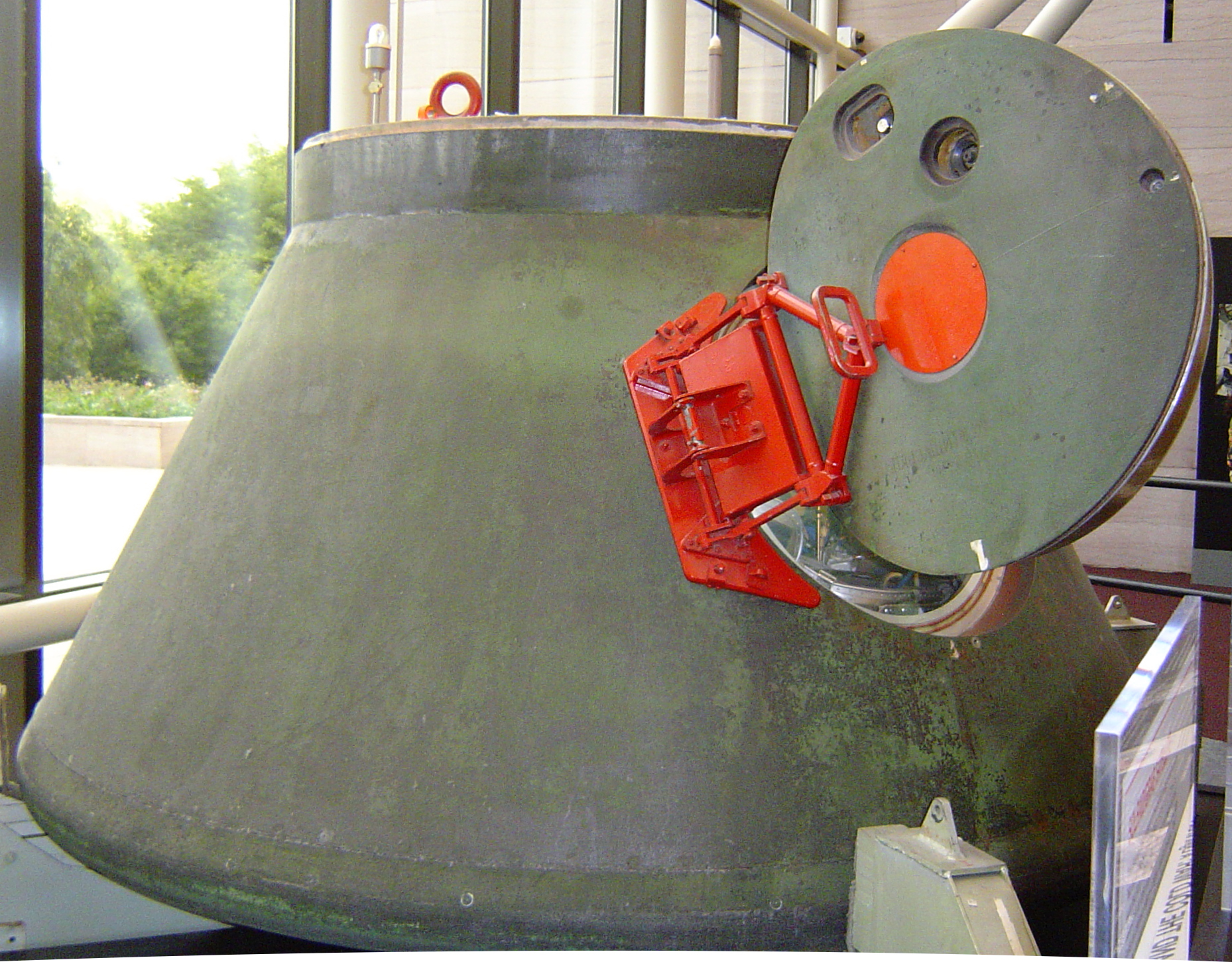
The VA capsule of the TKS spacecraft that flew as Kosmos 1443, on display in the National Air and Space Museum, Washington D.C. – this capsule was mislabeled as Merkur spacecraft.

The VA capsule on display at the Smithsonian National Air and Space Museum was labeled as Merkur, following a mistranslation of the original documentation – while incorrect, the name is being used in the West for the VA spacecraft and capsule.

The VA spacecraft was capable of independent flight – up to 31 hours in its last incarnation – it needed however to be combined with additional hardware (containing propulsion and storage) to achieve a longer flight duration.

Different usage scenarios for the VA spacecraft were planned:

- For the lunar flyby spacecraft LK-1 and LK-700, the plans by Vladimir Chelomei's design bureau OKB-52 were to mate a VA spacecraft together with an Equipment-Rocket System Block (PAB) and Translunar Injection Stage (RB).
- For the Almaz space station program, the plans envisaged two configurations for the crewed VA spacecraft:
  - A VA spacecraft would have launched the initial crew of an Almaz-OPS space station, the VA spacecraft launched together with the station itself; This combination was known as "Almaz APOS".
  - A VA spacecraft would have been launched mated together with a Functional Cargo Block (FGB) to resupply an Almaz station, in both crewed and uncrewed flights; This combination was known as the TKS spacecraft.

VA was the first spacecraft to be launched into orbit twice, as Kosmos 929 was recovered and launched again as Kosmos 998. Gemini 2 was launched into space twice, but both launches were suborbital.

While the VA spacecraft performed successful uncrewed test flights, both with and without a Functional Cargo Block, it never served in its intended role as a lunar vehicle due to cancellation of the soviet crewed lunar program, and it was never launched together with an Almaz space station.

== Design ==
=== LK-1 – crewed lunar flyby spacecraft ===
First work on the VA spacecraft began on 13 May 1961 by Vladimir Chelomey's OKB-52 design bureau, in response to the US Apollo program. The VA spacecraft consisted of three main parts:

- The VA capsule, which formed the pressurized habitable section for the crew
- The NO front compartment (Russian: Носовой Отсек НО, lit. "nose compartment"), housing the deorbit block (BSO), additional batteries, communication equipment, the parachute and soft landing engines
- The SAS launch escape system (Russian: Система Аварийного Спасения САС) – similar to Soyuz and Apollo – mounted on top of the nose section, jettisoned after first stage had burned out

Cosmonaut Alexei Leonov called the Almaz VA return capsule "our Apollo". The shape of the VA capsule was vaguely like that of the Apollo Command Module (CM), however some of the VA's support hardware was housed on top of the capsule in the nose compartment – unlike Apollo with the Apollo Service Module (SM) below the Apollo CM.

While the VA spacecraft was capable of independent flight of about one day, it needed to be mated to additional hardware for a longer flight duration. For a lunar mission, the LK-1 spacecraft would have been formed by mating the VA spacecraft with two components:

- The Equipment-Rocket System Block (PAB). It included – analogous to the Apollo's SM – solar panels and electrical power systems, communications systems like a parabolic antenna and thrusters for midcourse maneuvers.
- The Translunar Injection Stage (RB).

=== Almaz space station support craft ===
After the cancellation of the LK-1 crewed lunar spacecraft effort, the VA spacecraft was repurposed by Chelomey as support craft for his military Almaz space station program – again a response to a US program, the USAF's military Manned Orbiting Laboratory (MOL) and Gemini B effort.

==== Almaz APOS ====
The initial plans called for crew and station to be launched together with one Proton rocket launch, just like the US MOL/Gemini combination. For this a VA spacecraft would have been mated on top of an Almaz OPS space station core (11F71) – this was known as Almaz APOS. The crew would have ridden into space in the VA capsule; Once in orbit, the crew would have entered the Almaz station through a hatch in the heat shield – just like MOL/Gemini. The VA capsule would then remain unoccupied until the end of the mission, when it would serve as the reentry vehicle for the crew. The Almaz APOS concept evolved into the Almaz-OPS stations of the Salyut programme, which were however never launched together with their crew, nor together with a VA capsule.

==== TKS spacecraft ====
For the flights of the subsequent crews of an Almaz space station, the VA spacecraft would have been mated with a Functional Cargo Block (FGB, 11F77) instead. Together the VA and the FGB would form the crewed TKS spacecraft (11F72) for crew and resupply flights to Almaz space stations – the VA would serve in its role as launch and reentry vehicle for the crew, while the FGB would serve as a propulsion system, pressurized cargo carrier and contain the docking hardware.

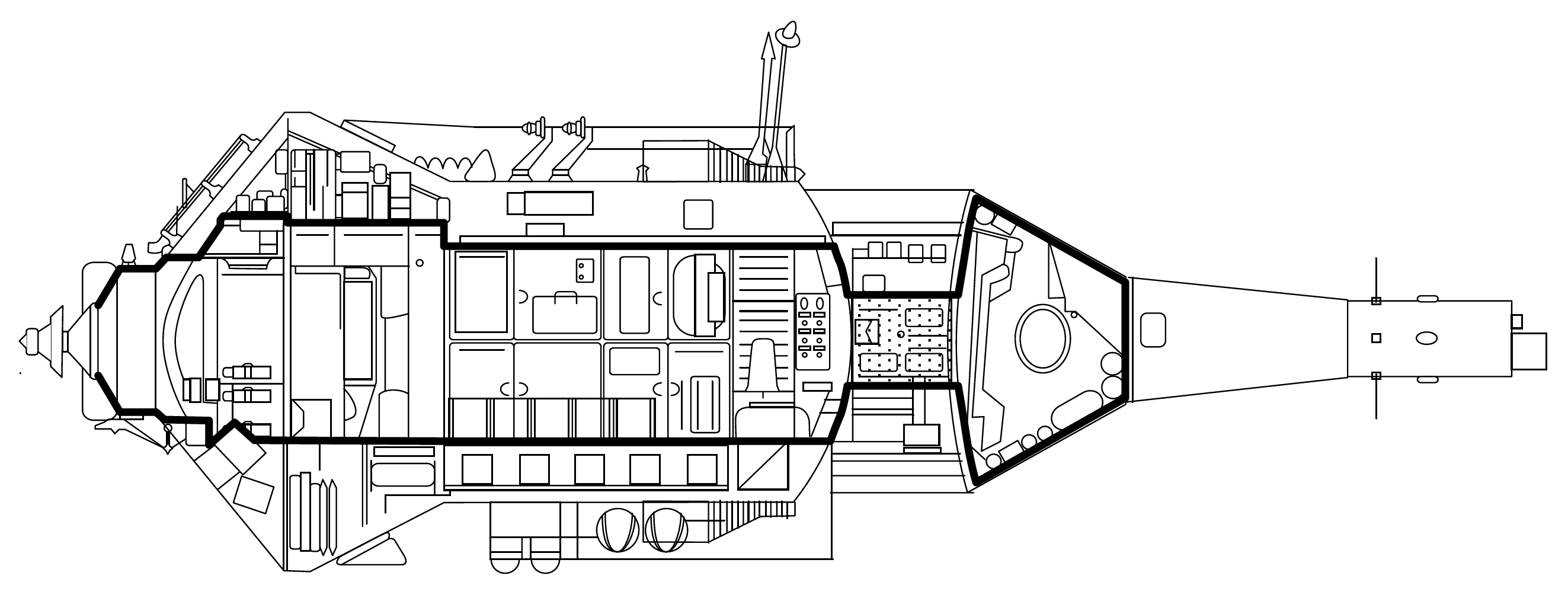
Cutaway drawing of a TKS spacecraft (details are conjectural). The FGB (on the left) features a tunnel (stippled) that connects it to the VA spacecraft on the right. The broad black line outlines the approximate pressurized volume accessible to the crew. The docking unit of the TKS is on the far left.

A few TKS spacecraft flew uncrewed missions, but never to an Almaz-OPS station. The FGB would however continue to find use and form the basis for several space station modules – the FGB concept is as of 2012 still in use for the Zarya FGB, albeit in modified form.

== Test flights ==
An illustration of an TKS spacecraft – the VA spacecraft is below and left to the center of the image, while most of the TKS is the FGB.

Although the VA was never launched crewed, never together with an Almaz-OPS station, and never to an Almaz-OPS station, it saw several flights, some in the intended TKS spacecraft configuration.

To accelerate the man-rating of the TKS and VA spacecraft, eight uncrewed VA spacecraft (without FGBs) were launched in pairs, testing two VA spacecraft per test flight. One of these flights was aborted due to the carrier rocket failure, and the VA capsule was successfully carried away from the exploding rocket by the launch escape system.

Another four uncrewed VA spacecraft were mated together with an FGB and launched as TKS spacecraft: the solo flight of Kosmos 929, the Kosmos 1267 flight to Salyut 6 and the flights of Kosmos 1443 and Kosmos 1686 to Salyut 7 (the VA spacecraft on the TKS flight of Kosmos 1686 was modified as a no-reentry laboratory segment).

The TKS program would, after these test flights, evolve into the Functional Cargo Block based space station modules, and the VA capsules would no longer be of service in the Soviet Union.

=== VA spacecraft test flights ===
==== Kosmos 881 and Kosmos 882 ====
VA 009A/1 (#009P) and VA 009/1 (#009L): Orbital test of a pair of two VA spacecraft Kosmos 881 and Kosmos 882 in 1976-12-15 that started jointly and reentered separately.

==== Kosmos 929 ====
VA 009A/2 test flight on 1977-07-17. The reentry module was refurbished and launched again on 1978–03–30 as Kosmos 998 .

==== Kosmos 937 and Kosmos 938 ====
VA 009A/P (#009P) and VA 009P/2 (#009L): Launched on 1977-08-05. Launch vehicle failure forty seconds into the flight on a suborbital test of two VA spacecraft. VA #009L is destroyed in the resulting booster explosion, VA #009P is rescued by the Proton SAS abort system and is recovered safely.

==== Kosmos 997 and Kosmos 998 ====
VA 009A/P2 and VA 009P/2 (009A/2): On 1978-03-30 pair of two VA spacecraft Kosmos 997 and Kosmos 998 that started jointly and reentered separately

==== Kosmos 1096 and Kosmos 1097 ====
VA #103 and VA #008: On 1979-04-20 the Proton carrier rocket suffered an on pad abort and did not lift off. Capsule VA #103 was lost.

==== Kosmos 1100 and Kosmos 1101 ====
VA 102A (#102P) and VA 102 (#102L): On 1979-05-22 pair of two VA spacecraft Kosmos 1100 and Kosmos 1101 that started jointly and reentered separately

=== TKS missions ===
==== TKS-1 (Kosmos 929) ====
Kosmos 929 was the first flight of a "complete" TKS spacecraft (VA 009A/2 spacecraft with FGB) on July 17, 1977.

==== TKS-2 (Kosmos 1267) ====
Kosmos 1267 flight of TKS spacecraft (VA 0103/3 spacecraft with FGB) to Salyut 6 on April 25, 1981.

==== TKS-3 (Kosmos 1443) ====
Kosmos 1443 was the first "complete" TKS craft (VA 0103/1 spacecraft and FGB) that docked to a Salyut station – Salyut 7 on March 2, 1983.

==== TKS-4 (Kosmos 1686) ====
Kosmos 1686 was on Sept. 27, 1985 the last flight of an TKS spacecraft – its target was the Salyut 7 space station. The VA capsule was modified to house remote sensing instruments.

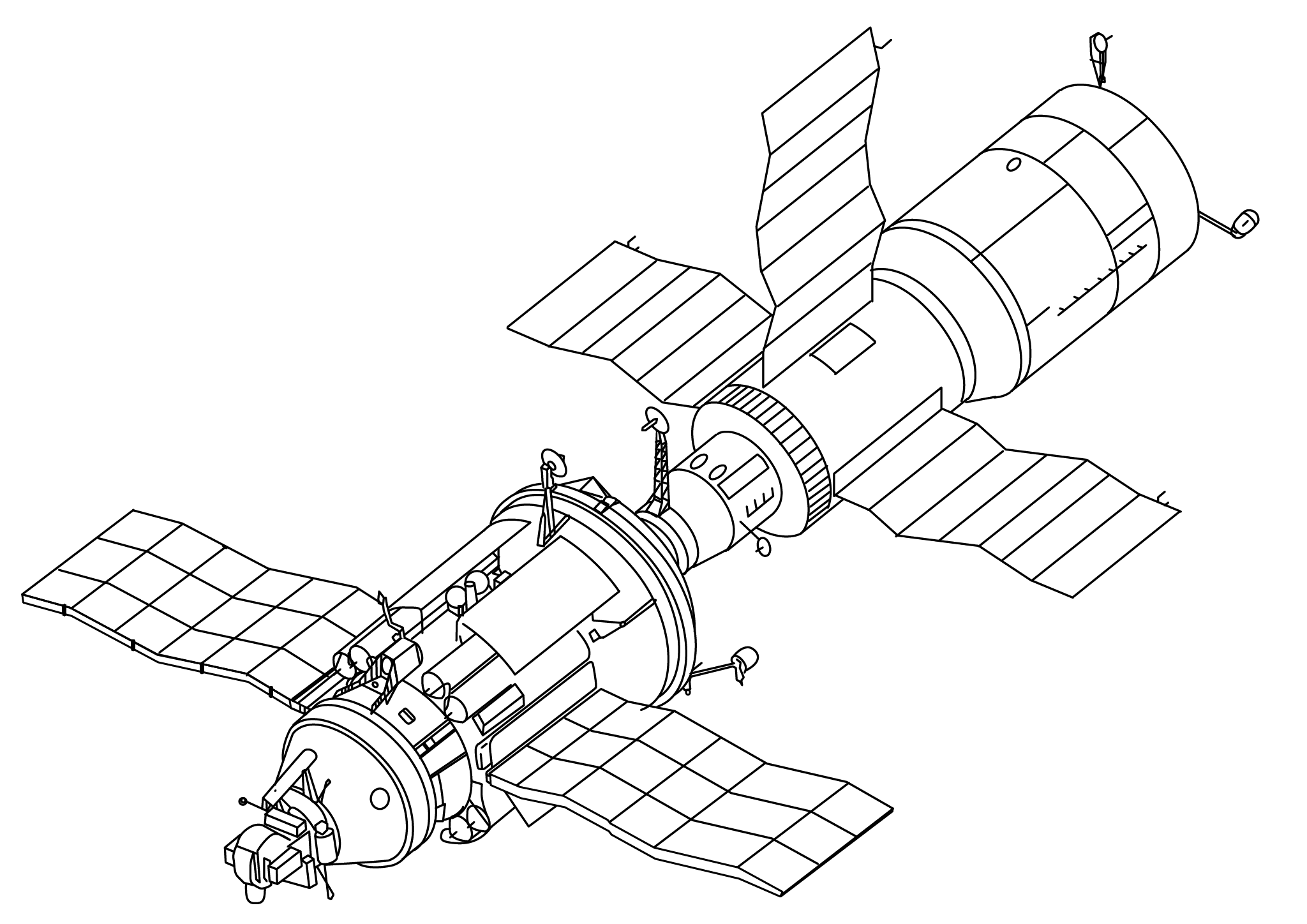
A drawing of the last flown TKS spacecraft, Kosmos 1686, depicted docked to the Salyut 7 space station. The VA capsule is visible on the bottom left. Note that the "nose section" of the VA spacecraft, that would have contained the de-orbit engines for the VA capsule, has been replaced with remote sensing instruments.

== Existing hardware ==
Some VA capsules are on display in museums or in storage. Known articles include:

- VA 009A/2 - (part of Kosmos 929 and Kosmos 998) Excalibur Almaz
- VA 009P/2 (009/2) - (part of Kosmos 881, Kosmos 938 and Kosmos 997) NPO Mashinostroyeniya
- #009/3 - (used for three air drop tests) Excalibur Almaz
- #103/1 (#511650103/1) - Memorial Museum of Cosmonautics
- #103/2 (#630850103/2) - Excalibur Almaz
- VA 0103/1 (#103/4) - (part of Kosmos 1443) Smithsonian Museum
- #069002060 - International Space University, Strasbourg
- #75615302 - Yevpatoria
- #? - NPO Energomash
- #? - Khrunichev State Research and Production Space Center
- #? - Vladimir Tchelomey School, Kazakhstan

== Specifications ==
=== VA spacecraft ===
The VA spacecraft included the VA capsule (see below) and the "nose section"; All data excluding TKS-FGB or Almaz-OPS.

- Mass at launch (including SAS launch escape system): 7,200 to 7,300 kilograms (15,900 to 16,100 lb)
- Mass in orbit: 4,800 kilograms (10,600 lb)
- Gross mass: 3,800 kilograms (8,400 lb)
- Launch payload: 1,880 kilograms (4,140 lb)
- Return payload: 3 persons and 50 kilograms (110 lb), or 500 kilograms (1,100 lb) uncrewed
- Height at launch (including SAS): 10.3 metres (34 ft)
- Height in orbit: 7.3 metres (24 ft)
- Diameter: 2.79 metres (9 ft 2 in)
- Independent operation: up to 31 hours
- First flight: December 15, 1976, as VA spacecraft ("twin" solo flights Kosmos 881 and Kosmos 882)
- Last flight: September 27, 1985, as TKS spacecraft (Kosmos 1686)

=== VA capsule ===
All data for TKS version, unless otherwise stated.

- Crew size: 1 for LK-1, 3 for TKS
- Total internal volume: 8.37 cubic metres (296 cu ft)
- Habitable volume: 4.56 cubic metres (161 cu ft)
- Diameter: 2.79 metres (9 ft 2 in)
- Reusable for 10 flights

=== TKS spacecraft ===
A TKS spacecraft consisted of a VA spacecraft mated to a Functional Cargo Block (FGB). The specifications of the TKS spacecraft were as follows:

- Mass at launch: 21,620 kilograms (47,660 lb)
- Mass in orbit: 17,570 kilograms (38,740 lb)
- Payload (total): 12,600 kilograms (27,800 lb) (including consumables and VA spacecraft)
- Payload (dry cargo): about 5,200 kilograms (11,500 lb)
- Payload (fuel): 3,822 kilograms (8,426 lb)
- Height: 17.51 metres (57.4 ft)
- Span: 17.00 metres (55.77 ft)
- Thrust: 7.84 kilonewtons (1,760 lb_{f})
- Electric power: 2.40 kilowatts (3.22 hp) on average

== Excalibur Almaz ==
The company Excalibur Almaz acquired four VA return capsule hulls and two Almaz space station hulls. The company planned to outfit and launch both the VA capsules and the Almaz station hulls; One VA capsule was planned to be used in support of space tourism while the other three VA capsules were reserved for scientific and commercial payloads. The needed development of propulsion systems for the VA capsule was reportedly delegated to an unnamed European organization as early as 2009. As of 2016 Excalibur Almaz is defunct. Three of its four VA spacecraft, none of which were ever launched by the company, were resold at auction, while the fourth was placed on permanent display at the Isle of Man Motor Museum in 2021.

== See also ==
- Almaz
- TKS Spacecraft
