= Kosmos 1686 =

Fourth and final TKS spacecraft

- Kosmos 1686 (top) docked to Salyut 7, imaged by Range-Doppler radar.

- Salyut program insignia

Station statistics
- COSPAR ID: 1985-086A
- SATCAT no.: 16095
- Call sign: Salyut 7
- Launch: 1985-09-27; 02:01:00 UTC; Docked to Salyut 7 on 1985-10-02.
- Launch pad: Baikonur 200/39
- Reentry: February 7, 1991
- Mass: 20,000 kg
- Length: 15 m
- Width: 16 m
- Diameter: 4.15 m
- Periapsis altitude: 219 km (118.25 nmi)
- Apoapsis altitude: 278 km (150.1 nmi)
- Orbital inclination: 51.6 degrees
- Orbital period: 89.2 minutes
- Orbits per day: 16.14
- Days in orbit: 1959 days
- Statistics as of deorbit & reentry References
- Configuration
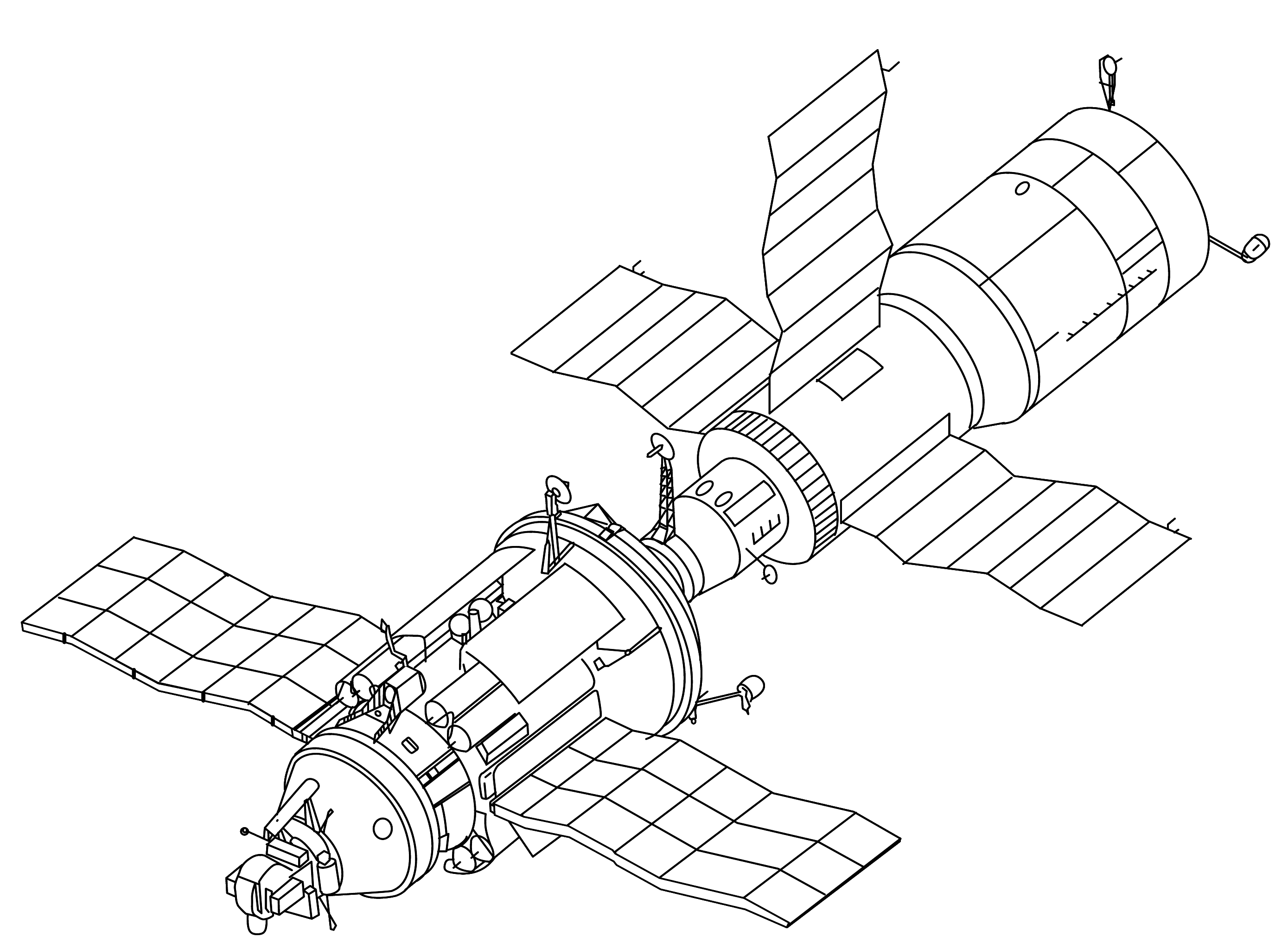
- Combined Kosmos 1686-Salyut 7 space station complex

Kosmos 1686 (Russian: Космос 1686 meaning Cosmos 1686), also known as TKS-4, was a heavily modified TKS spacecraft which docked unmanned to the Soviet space station Salyut 7 as part of tests to attach scientific expansion modules to stations in Earth orbit. The module which docked to the station was the FGB component of a TKS vehicle launched on September 27, 1985, and was designed to test systems planned for use on the Mir Core Module. The spacecraft docked with Salyut 7 on October 2, 1985, during the long-duration stay of the cosmonauts of its fifth principal expedition, which arrived on Soyuz T-14. It was the last flown TKS spacecraft.

== Notable features ==
- The spacecraft's VA capsule was greatly modified to carry instruments – the retrorocket and parachute packages were replaced by scientific equipment, including an infrared telescope and the Ozon spectrometer.
- The combined Salyut 7-Kosmos 1686 complex massed 43 tons, with Kosmos 1686 delivering 4500 kg of cargo to Salyut 7 and nearly doubling the amount of habitable volume available to the station's crew.
- On August 19–22, 1986, ground controllers boosted the vacant Salyut 7-Kosmos 1686 complex to a 474 km by 492 km orbit using engines on Kosmos 1686. This reduced the propellant supply of the complex to 70 kg (about 500 kg were required for controlled deorbit). In addition, Kosmos 1686 and Salyut 7 each suffered major systems breakdowns soon after they were abandoned, making the complex impossible to control.
- All previous space stations over which the Soviets maintained control were intentionally deorbited after their last cosmonaut crew departed. The Soviets estimated that the reboost gave the complex an 8-yr lifetime in orbit. They considered recovering the station using the Buran shuttle. However, following delays to and the eventual cancellation of the Buran program, Kosmos 1686 underwent uncontrolled reentry with Salyut 7 on February 7, 1991, reentering over Argentina, scattering much of its debris over the town of Capitan Bermudez.
