= Aelita (spacecraft) =

Planned satellite/spacecraft of the Soyuz programme

Aelita (Soyuz)
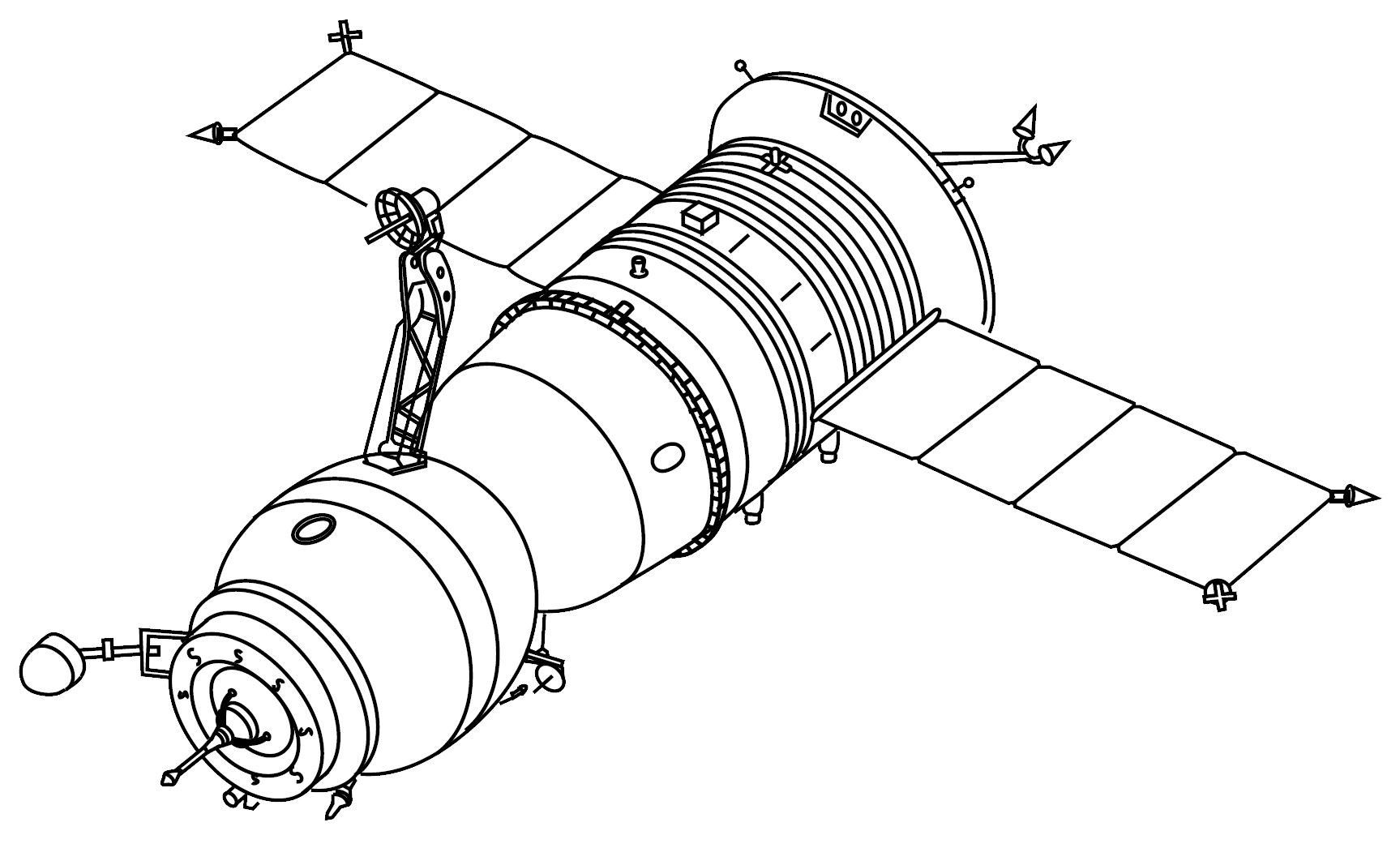
- Aelita was to be built into a Soyuz-T spacecraft, as pictured here.
- Manufacturer: Experimental Design Bureau (OKB-1)
- Country of origin: Soviet Union
- Operator: Soviet space program
- Applications: Satellite/spacecraft

Specifications
- Launch mass: 7,350 kilograms (16,200 lb)
- Dimensions: Height 8 metres (26 ft) Volume 9,000 cubic metres (320,000 cu ft)
- Power: Solar arrays
- Equipment: Infrared astronomy telescope
- Regime: Low Earth orbit

Production
- Status: Canceled 1982
- Built: 0
- Launched: 0

Aelita was a Soviet design of a version of a Soyuz spacecraft started in 1978. The Aelita was part of the Soyuz programme, but was planned to use an unmanned Soyuz spacecraft as an infrared astronomy telescope satellite. A Soyuz spacecraft was planned to be modified to become the Aelita project satellite. The Aelita project was not completed, and was cancelled in 1982.

== Design ==
The Soviet plan for an infrared astronomy satellite began in 1965 as part of the Soviet Cloud Space Station plan. The Cloud Space Station developed into the MKBS/MOK space station complex plan. In February 1976, both production of Aelita and production of the MKBS/MOK-Mir space station were approved. Aelita was to have a gross mass of 7,350 kilograms (16,200 lb). Aelita's plans had a passive space docking port so that the spacecraft could be serviced by Soyuz crewed spacecraft. Crew members could replace the telescope film cassettes every six months and repair or replace instruments if needed. Since the spacecraft/satellite would not need to go through reentry into the atmosphere of Earth, the Soyuz descent equipment and orbital modules would be removed, so the infrared astronomy telescope could be installed. The telescope was to be placed in a large, pressurized cylinder in the Soyuz spacecraft. By 1978, the Aelita instrument payload was in the design and development phase. Soyuz spacecraft were built by the Experimental Design Bureau. In May 1974, the N1 launch vehicle and the MKBS space station both were cancelled after the many failures of the N1 rocket. Aelita was a subset of the MKBS space station, not Mir, so Aelita was also cancelled. After the failure of the N1 rocket and thus the Soviet lunar program, the Soviet space program was completely reorganized. While the lunar project was cancelled in February 1976, a new space station was authorized, the DOS-7/DOS-8 space station, which evolved into Mir, launched in 1986.

While Aelita never flew, Aelita's sister spacecraft, the Gamma satellite, was complete and was launched in 1990. The Gamma project was a joint Soviet-French project.

Aelita is known for being one of the longest projects on the drawing board, started in 1965 and ending in 1982, 17 years in planning.

== See also ==
- Soyuz 7K
- Soyuz 9K
- Soyuz 7K-P
