= Kosmos 1267 =

Uncrewed TKS spacecraft

- TKS spacecraft diagram

Module statistics
- COSPAR ID: 1981-039A
- Part of: Salyut 6
- Launch date: 1981-04-25; 02:01:00 UTC
- Launch vehicle: Proton-K
- Docked: 1981-06-19
- Reentry: 1982-07-29
- Mass: 19,000 kg

Configuration
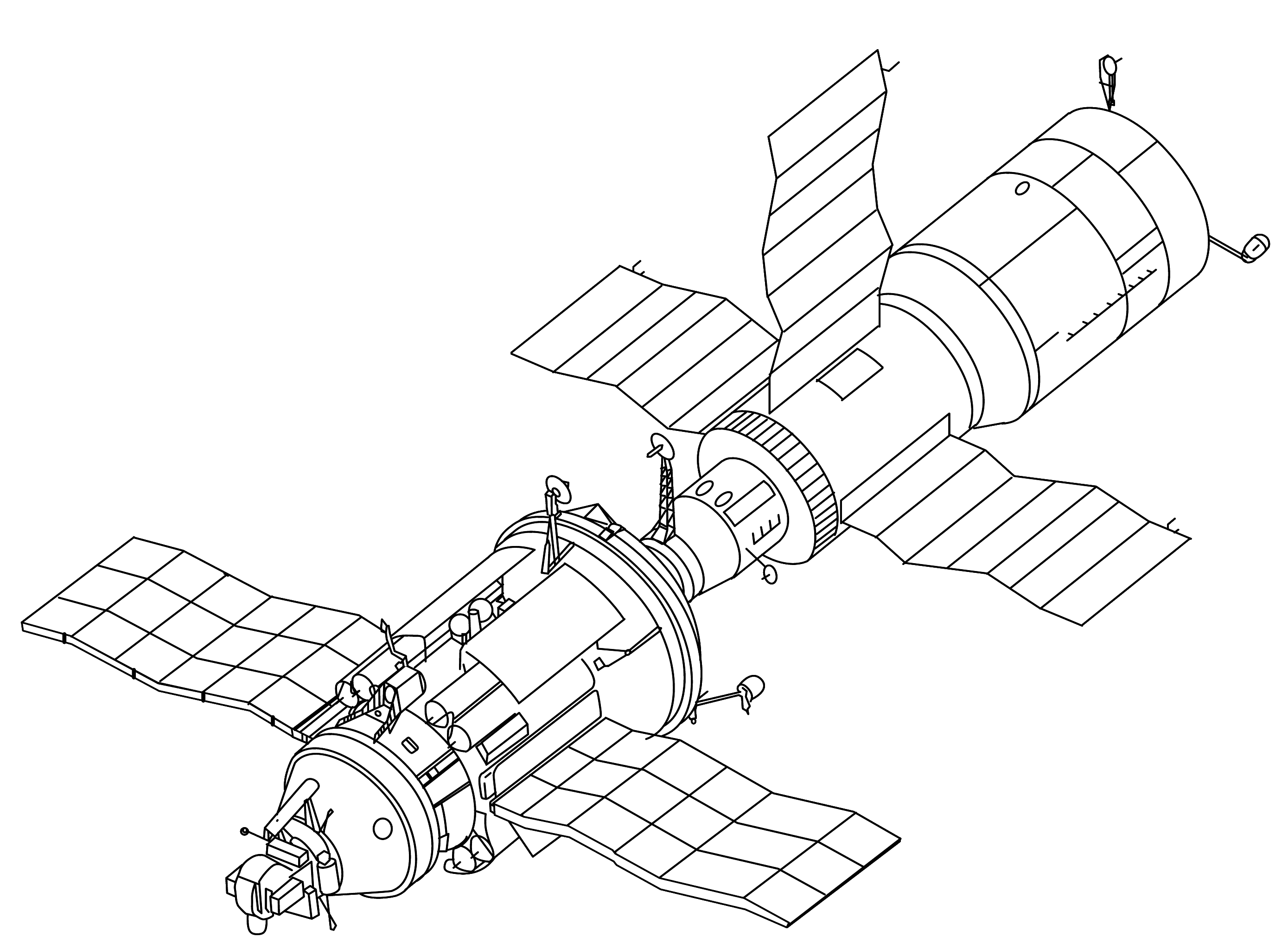
- Configuration of a TKS-Salyut combined space station

Kosmos 1267 (Russian: Космос 1267 meaning Cosmos 1267), also known as TKS-2, was an unmanned TKS spacecraft which docked to the Soviet space station Salyut 6 as part of tests to attach scientific expansion modules to stations in Earth orbit. The module which docked to the station was the FGB component of a TKS vehicle launched on April 25, 1981. The spacecraft's VA return capsule separated and landed in the Soviet Union on May 26, 1982.
