= LK-1 =

Projected Soviet crewed lunar flyby spacecraft

- Manufacturer: OKB-52
- Country of origin: Soviet Union
- Operator: Soviet space program
- Applications: Carry cosmonauts around the Moon and back to Earth

Production
- Status: Canceled

Related spacecraft
- Derivatives: LK-700, TKS spacecraft

LK-1 was a projected Soviet crewed lunar flyby spacecraft. It would be launched on a three-stage Proton launch vehicle. The project started in 1962 under the lead engineer Vladimir Chelomey, with the first flight planned for 1967.

The LK-1 had its origin in several early 1960s spacecraft projects under the generic names of kosmoplans and raketoplans.

In 1965 the project was cancelled in favour of the Soyuz 7K-L1 spacecraft.

Further developments came as the LK-700 direct-descent lunar lander program.

== Configuration ==
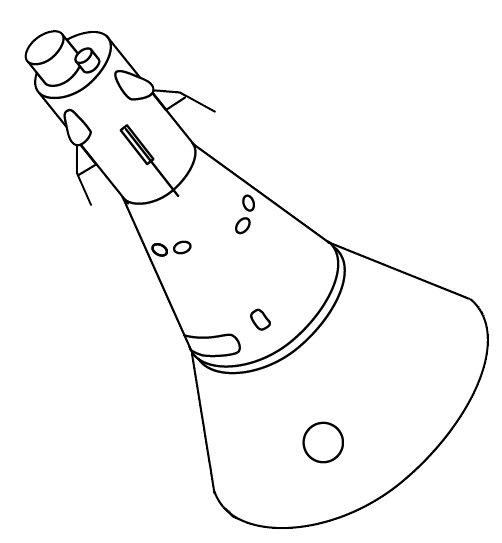
A drawing of a VA spacecraft: The VA capsule is on the lower right, while the braking engines are located on top of the long "nose section". The launch escape system (not shown) would have been attached on top of the nose section.

The spacecraft consisted of the following modules:

- ADU Emergency Engine Unit
- VA Capsule (crew module)
- PAB Equipment-Rocket System Block (service module)
- RB Translunar Injection Stage

== Characteristics ==
- Crew Size: 2
- Spacecraft delta v: 3,300 m/s
- Electric System: 2.00 average kW.
- Gross mass: 17,000 kg
- Un-fuelled mass: 4,000 kg
- Height: 5.20 m
- Span: 7.27 m
