= Almaz program =

Soviet military space station program

Line drawing of an Almaz space station

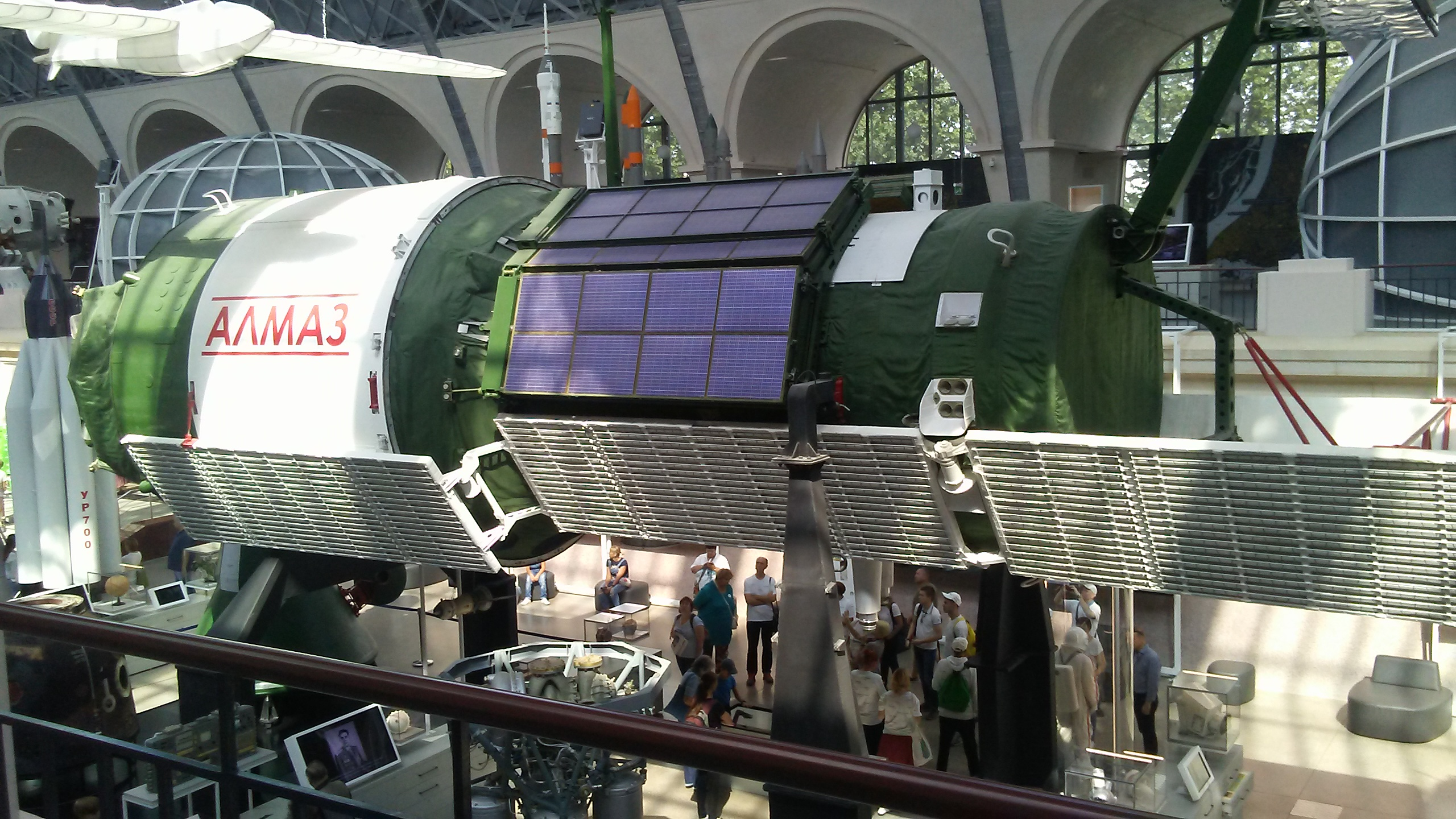
Almaz space station at VDNKh (Russia)

The Almaz (Russian: Алмаз, lit. 'Diamond') program was a highly secret Soviet military space station program, begun in the early 1960s.

Three crewed military reconnaissance stations were launched between 1973 and 1976: Salyut 2, Salyut 3 and Salyut 5. To cover the military nature of the program, the three launched Almaz stations were designated as civilian Salyut space stations. Salyut 2 failed shortly after achieving orbit, but Salyut 3 and Salyut 5 both conducted successful crewed testing. Following Salyut 5, the Soviet Ministry of Defense judged in 1978 that the time and resources consumed by station maintenance outweighed the benefits relative to automatic reconnaissance satellites. Still, it had some achievements along with the Salyut program, the heritage of the twin program continues, with the International Space Station module Zarya being one example.

The space stations' cores were known internally as OPS (Russian: ОПС, GRAU index 11F71 and 11F71B), from "Orbital Piloted Station" (Russian: Орбитальная Пилотируемая Станция). As part of the Almaz program, the Soviets developed several spacecraft for support roles—the VA spacecraft, the Functional Cargo Block and the TKS spacecraft, which they planned to use in several combinations.

== Development ==
Vladimir Chelomey at the OKB-52 design bureau promoted Almaz as a response to the U.S. Air Force's Manned Orbiting Laboratory (MOL) project. MOL had been widely publicized in the American press in the early 1960s, which provided Chelomey plenty of material to use to lobby for a Soviet response.

The Almaz space station program involved three major hardware components:

- Orbital Piloted Station (OPS, 11F71) module, forming the space station core,
- Functional Cargo Block (FGB, 11F77), intended as resupply craft for the stations, and
- VA spacecraft (11F74, known in the West as the Merkur spacecraft), intended as launch and return vehicle for the crews, and reusable for up to 10 flights.

The OPS would have a maximum diameter of 4.15 metres (13.6 ft), a mass of roughly 20 tonnes (20 long tons; 22 short tons), and an internal habitable volume of 47.5 cubic metres (1,680 cu ft).

Much like its MOL/Gemini counterpart, the initial Almaz APOS space station design called for the launch of an Almaz-OPS space station and a VA return craft containing its initial three-man crew, mated together as OPS/VA atop Chelomey's UR-500 Proton rocket. As with MOL/Gemini, once in orbit the crew would access the laboratory through a hatch in the heat shield at the bottom of the VA capsule. After an extended stay of 30 to 60 days of military observation and photography, the crew would return to Earth by way of a VA return vehicle.

Unlike the American MOL design, the Soviets designed the Almaz to be recrewed and resupplied. For this, they created the TKS resupply craft (11F72), which consisted of an FGB and a VA return craft to carry the crew, also launched together on a Proton rocket. At the station, one docking port would be available to receive the TKS craft once the previous crew had left the station in their VA capsule.

While the MOL was cancelled in 1969, the Almaz program was integrated into the Salyut program and resulted in three flown space stations, two of which were crewed successfully. As "man-rating" the VA spacecraft and the Proton rocket took longer, the first phase called for the launch of three Almaz stations without the VA spacecraft, with the crew instead launched separately by Soyuz rocket in a modified Soyuz spacecraft. Plans called for the first three Almaz stations to be visited by three two-month-long expeditions each. This was realized fully by two missions and partially by one; however, the initial intention of launching Almaz APOS and the TKS spacecraft together with its crew in VA spacecraft would never materialize during the program, and neither would the TKS craft play its intended role as resupply craft. The Almaz APOS design, without VA spacecraft, would evolve into the Almaz OPS station cores of the Salyut program.

=== Defense measures ===
In addition to reconnaissance equipment, Almaz was equipped with a unique Rikhter R-23 23mm (factory index 261P or 225P) rapid-fire cannon mounted on the forward belly of the station. This revolver cannon was modified from the tail-gun of the Tupolev Tu-22 bomber and was capable of a theoretical rate of fire of 1800–2000 (up to 2600) rounds per minute. Each 168 gram (ammo 23-OFZ-D-R) or 173 gram (ammo 23-OFZ-G-R) projectile flew at a speed of 850 m/s relative to the station. The cannon was tested at the end of the mission by firing 20 rounds, when the station was operating in uncrewed mode. To aim the cannon, which was on a fixed mounting, the entire station would be turned to face the target. The Almaz series are the only known armed, crewed military spacecraft ever flown.

Salyut 3/OPS-2 conducted a successful remote test firing with the station uncrewed due to concerns over excessive vibration and noise.

OPS-4 was to have featured two rockets instead of the aircraft cannon, but this system has not been shown publicly and may have never been fully manufactured despite it being used experimentally.

== Orbital Piloted Stations (OPS) ==
An unflown Soviet Almaz military orbital station in open-air museum, Baikonur.

Three Almaz OPS space stations were flown from 1973 to 1976 in the Salyut program: Salyut 2 (OPS-1), Salyut 3 (OPS-2) and Salyut 5 (OPS-3). Five crewed Soyuz expeditions were flown to the Almaz space stations Salyut 3 and Salyut 5, with three reaching their stations and only two of the missions being considered fully successful at that time – the three crews that had reached their stations had crewed Almaz stations for a total of 81 days when the program was ended.

Besides the three flown space stations OPS-1 to OPS-3, seven more spaceframes of Almaz space stations had been built when the program was cancelled: OPS-4, Almaz-205, Almaz-206, Almaz-T, Almaz-T2 (Kosmos 1870), Almaz-1 and Almaz-2, with Almaz-T2 and Almaz-1 having successfully flown as repurposed uncrewed radar-carrying reconnaissance satellites (see below). The partially outfitted hulls of Almaz-205 and Almaz-206 were acquired by Excalibur Almaz, a company that planned to launch these as crewed space stations (see below).

=== Flown Almaz space stations ===
==== OPS-1 (Salyut 2) ====
The first Almaz station (OPS-1 or Almaz 101.1) was launched on April 3, 1973. For purposes of military secrecy, it was publicly designated Salyut 2 upon reaching orbit. A crew was prepared to fly to the station, but an accident days after the launch left OPS-1 disabled and depressurized.

==== OPS-2 (Salyut 3) ====
OPS-2 (or Almaz 101.2), announced as Salyut 3, was launched on June 25, 1974. The crew of the Soyuz 14 spacecraft spent 15 days aboard the station in July 1974. A second expedition was launched toward OPS-2 in August 1974, but failed to reach the station. The station successfully remotely test-fired an onboard aircraft cannon at a target satellite while the station was uncrewed. Salyut-3 was deorbited in January 1975.

==== OPS-3 (Salyut 5) ====
OPS-3 (or Almaz 103), announced after launch as Salyut 5, entered orbit on June 22, 1976. It was visited by two crews in mid-1976 and late 1977. Salyut 5 was deorbited on 8 August 1977, and broke up as it reentered the Earth's atmosphere.

=== Unflown Almaz space stations ===
==== OPS-4 ====
The next Almaz station, OPS-4, was to be the first station launched with a three panel Mech-A synthetic-aperture radar and a crewed reusable Return Vehicle, but the VA was replaced by a second TKS docking port. This station's Shchit-1 23 mm defense autocannon was also to be replaced with an advanced Shchit-2 space-to-space cannon. The Shchit-2 was reported to be a two projectile system, although no photographs of it have ever been published and it does not appear that this system was ever installed on the station. OPS-4 was grounded when the Almaz crewed program was cancelled.

== Almaz-T (uncrewed) ==
Almaz radar satellite (based on Almaz space station).

Following cancellation of the program, the Almaz station was reconfigured as an uncrewed heavy radar-carrying reconnaissance satellite. Three such satellites were launched, two of which functioned successfully in orbit.

=== Almaz-T ===
The first Almaz-T blasted off from Baikonur on November 29, 1986. It did not reach orbit due to the failure of the first and second stages of the Proton launcher to separate. The safety system then destroyed the vehicle.

=== Almaz-T2 (Kosmos 1870) ===
On July 25, 1987, Almaz-T2, the second Almaz-T spacecraft, successfully reached orbit with an inclination 71.92 degrees toward the Equator and it was officially identified as Kosmos-1870. The spacecraft functioned for two years, providing radar imagery with a resolution down to 25 meters, until it was deorbited on July 30, 1989.

It was the first commercial radar satellite, according to Art Dula, chairman of Excalibur Almaz, who worked in a company marketing the radar images gathered by the satellite.

=== Almaz-1 ===
The third Almaz-T spacecraft was launched on March 31, 1991, under the name Almaz-1. After the launch a failure of the communications antenna designed to downlink the imagery via the Luch relay satellite was noted. Also one of the solar panels failed to deploy completely, leaving the main radar panel of the spacecraft partially blocked. After 18 months of successful work Almaz-1 was deorbited on October 17, 1992, over the Pacific Ocean.

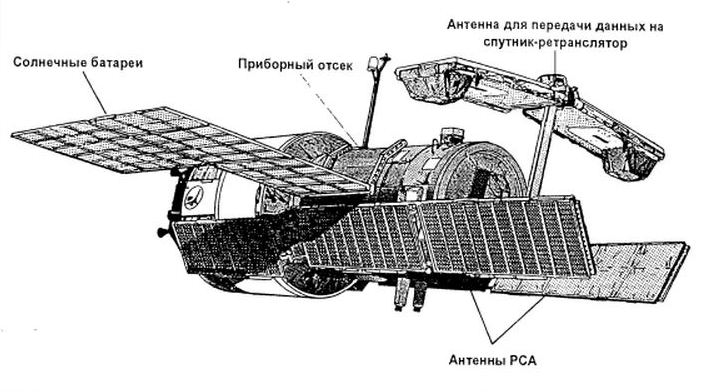
Almaz-1A

=== Almaz-2 ===
Almaz-2, or Almaz-1V, was not flown. It had a new radar that would have provided a resolution of 5 to 7 meters. In addition, an optical-electronic payload on the station would have been capable of producing imagery with a resolution of 2.5 to 4 meters.

== Legacy ==
The heritage of the Almaz space station program continues into the present, as in the International Space Station and in the Tianhe core module of the Tiangong space station.

=== DOS space station cores ===
The DOS (Durable Orbital Station) space station core modules were based on the Almaz-OPS hull design, which was mated by Sergei Korolev's organization OKB-1 with their own Soyuz-derived subsystems. OKB-1 was at that time in competition with the designer of the Almaz, Vladimir Chelomei's organization OKB-52, and was thereby able to short-cut the development time for the first space station and beat OKB-52, which had started design work much earlier.

DOS space station cores derived since 1971 from the Almaz-OPS hull design include:

- DOS-1, which formed the basis for Salyut 1 space station, in 1971 the first space station in the history of space flight
- DOS-5 and DOS-6, the cores for the long lived Salyut 6 and Salyut 7 space stations
- DOS-7, the Mir Core Module for the Mir space station, the first modular space station
- DOS-8, the Zvezda "Service Module" for the International Space Station, as of 2025 still in use

=== Functional Cargo Block (FGB) ===
The FGB was a standalone spacecraft which was intended to function as a resupply craft for the Almaz space stations. The "functional" section of the name is representative of the fact that the FGB provided electrical power, propulsion, guidance, and docking. Cargo was presented as a large cargo bay accessible by the crew, as well as external fuel tanks. Other types of FGB existed, as it was a broad classification rather than a specific type of module. FGB-based vehicles include Transport Logistics Spacecraft (Russian Acronym: TKS) (1976–1983), Space Station modules (1985–present), and space tugs (1987–present)

The modules based on the DOS design are not the only heritage of the Almaz program still in use: The habitat, propulsion and service module of the TKS spacecraft, the so-called Functional Cargo Block (FGB), went on to become the core of many Soviet and Russian space station modules. The FGB-based Kvant-1 module of the Mir space station was the first space station module of its kind, and the Zarya Functional Cargo Block, which is as of 2018 still in use on the International Space Station.

=== Excalibur Almaz ===
The private spaceflight company Excalibur Almaz bought the two partially completed Almaz-205 and Almaz-206 space station hulls from the Russian NPO Mashinostroyeniya (the former OKB-52) with the stated intention to outfit and launch them. The Almaz-205 module is similar to the OPS-2 of the Salyut 3 station, while the Almaz-206 is closer to the OPS-3 of the Salyut 5 station.

In addition, Excalibur Almaz acquired four VA return capsule hulls (derived from the TKS/VA spacecraft) and planned to outfit and launch them as well: one was planned to be used in support of space tourism while the other three capsules were reserved for scientific and commercial payloads. The needed development of propulsion systems for the VA capsule was reportedly delegated to an unnamed European organization as early as 2009.

Excalibur Almaz postponed its first launch to 2015 to be able to include more lucrative deep space capabilities like asteroid mining. However, in 2015 the company was reported to be in financial trouble, and it was not clear what happened to their spacecraft.

Excalibur Almaz ceased operations in 2016 without ever launching a spacecraft. As of 2021 one of the two Almaz space station hulls formerly owned by Excalibur Almaz is on permanent display at the Isle of Man Motor Museum; the disposition of the other hull is unknown.

== Depictions in fiction ==
- The Apollo Murders (2021), an alternate history novel by Chris Hadfield set in 1973 during the Cold War in which Apollo 18 intercepts Almaz in orbit with instructions to sabotage it

== See also ==
- TKS, the resupply craft developed for Almaz and Salyut
- Militarisation of Space
- List of space stations
