= LK-700 =

Soviet moon lander program

- Manufacturer: OKB-52
- Country of origin: Soviet Union
- Operator: Soviet space program
- Applications: Land cosmonauts on the Moon and bring them back to Earth

Production
- Status: Canceled

Related spacecraft
- Derived from: LK-1
- Derivatives: TKS spacecraft

LK-700 was a Soviet direct ascent lunar lander program proposed in 1964. It was developed by Vladimir Chelomey as an alternative to the N1-L3 program. It was also a further development of the LK-1 lunar flyby spacecraft.

It would have been launched using the proposed UR-700 rocket (related to the Proton rocket) with a crew of three cosmonauts on a direct flight to the lunar surface and back. The direct landing approach would allow the Soviets to land anywhere on the moon's nearside. The program was canceled in 1974.

== Mission profile ==
Uncrewed flights would be followed by crewed flights. The proposed schedule was:

- May 1972: First UR-700/LK-700 uncrewed launch. Subsequent launches in November 1972 and April 1973.
- April 1973: First crewed UR-700/LK-700 launch. Subsequent flights in August and October 1973.

Following initial LK-700 landings, the more ambitious Lunar Expeditionary Complex (LKE) would be delivered to the surface in three UR-700 launches:

- Launch 1: lunar station to enable a six-month stay
- Launch 2: LK-700 with crew
- Launch 3: large rover

== Characteristics ==
- Crew size: 3
- Orbital storage: 45 days
- Spacecraft delta v: 9,061 m/s
- Gross mass: 154,000 kg
- Height: 21.20 m
- Span: 2.70 m
- Thrust: 131.40 kN
- Specific impulse: 326 s
