= Functional Cargo Block =

Spacecraft and International Space Station component

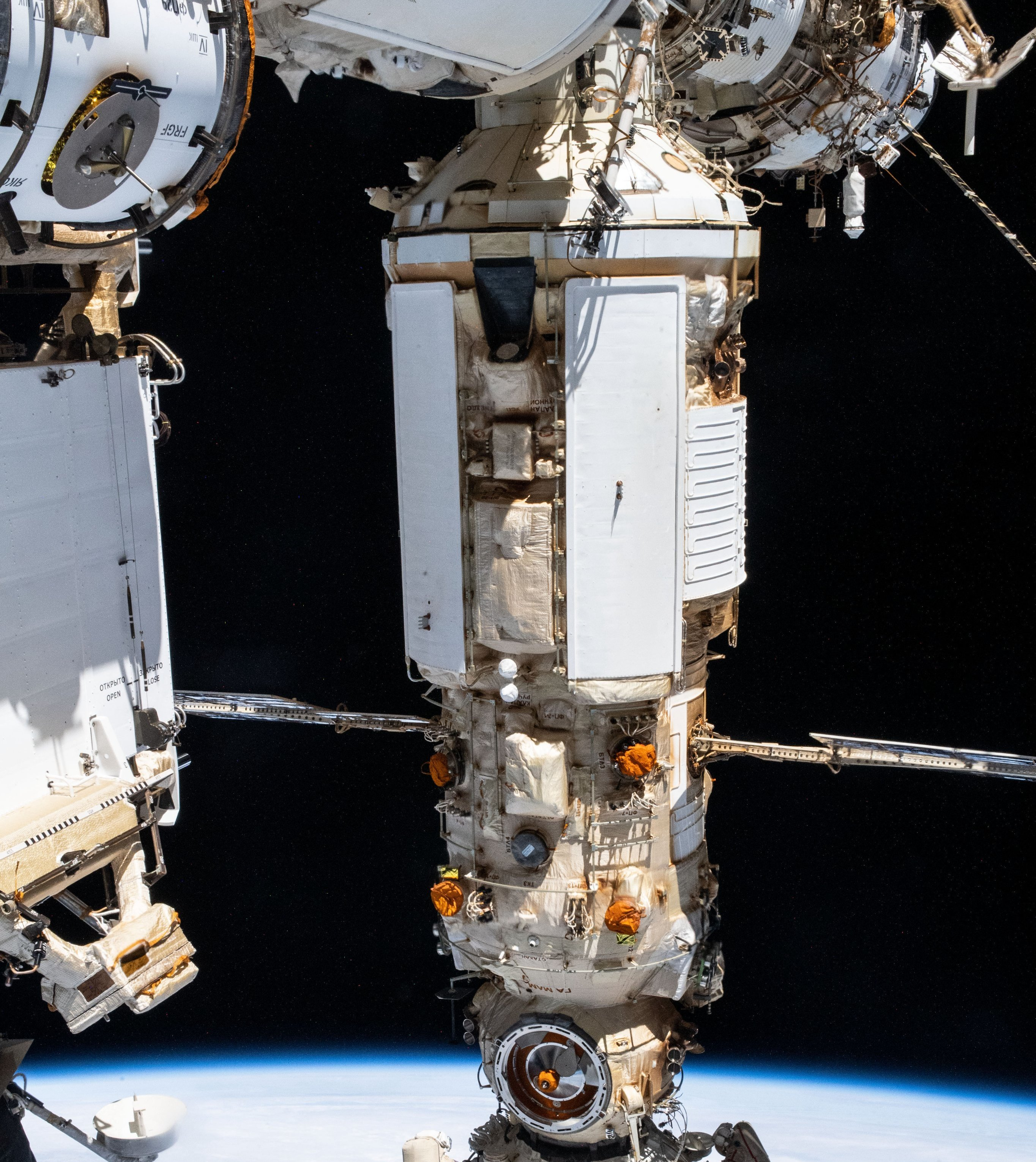
The ISS space station module Nauka is the latest space station module based on the Functional Cargo Block (FGB) design, attached with Prichal docking module as seen during VKD-51 spacewalk.

The Functional Cargo Block or FGB (from the Russian "Функционально-грузовой блок", ФГБ, "Funktsionalno-gruzovoy blok", FGB, GRAU index 11F77) was part of the Soviet TKS spacecraft. The TKS spacecraft was intended to be used as a resupply craft for Almaz space stations and saw some test flights in the Salyut space station program. The TKS spacecraft was formed by mating a FGB with a VA spacecraft, with both the VA and the FGB being capable of independent operation.

Following the development of the FGB for the TKS spacecraft, the FGB (without VA spacecraft) formed the basis for space station modules in the Soviet and Russian space program – these space station modules are to some extent called Functional Cargo Block (FGB) as well, like the Zarya FGB module.

The FGB provides "functional" support in the form of electrical power, propulsion, guidance and docking; The support for "cargo" operations is supplied in the form of a pressurized habitable cargo storage section (accessible by the crew) and the externally mounted fuel tanks.

== History ==
The Functional Cargo Block (FGB) was originally developed as support for the VA spacecraft—with both together forming the TKS spacecraft, intended for resupply flights to the Almaz space stations. For Salyut space station modules, it was initially intended that the first such modules be derived from the Progress spacecraft (which in turn is a Soyuz spacecraft derivate), and not the FGB. As the Almaz program wound down, TKS test missions to Salyut stations were used to gather experience on docking larger modules to space stations. The TKS flights proved that the FGBs could form the basis of such a space station module, with the TKS being flight ready, and having a considerable larger capacity than the Progress – so the FGB and not the Progress became the basis of many Soviet and Russian space station modules. The Gamma observatory, the initially intended first Progress-based research module, would become after these and other changes the free-flying Gamma satellite.

== Design ==
The basic layout of the exemplary Zarya FGB consists of two sections:

- The Instrumentation and Cargo Compartment (ICC) with a pressurized volume of 64.5 cubic metres (2,280 cu ft)
- The Pressurized Adapter (PA) with a pressurized volume of 7.0 cubic metres (250 cu ft)

The PA is separated from the ICC by a spherical bulkhead containing an 800 mm hatch. Both pressurized sections contain working and living areas, in addition to instrumentation separated by interior panels.

== Functional Cargo Blocks ==
With the end of the Almaz program, KB Salyut, which had developed the FGB, was left with a small fleet of unused spacecraft.

The first use for one of the leftover FGB's was as a space tug, delivering the Kvant-1 module to the Mir space station in 1987. After Kvant-1 was attached to the Mir core module, the FGB detached and was deorbited. An FGB was next employed as the core of the Polyus spacecraft, part of the Skif laser weapons program, which was destroyed during the first launch of the Energia rocket in May 1987 due to a control system problem.

Following the cancellation of Skif, KB Salyut proposed adapting the FGB as a series of low-cost, permanently attached modules for Mir, each capable of delivering itself to the station. The government approved the plan over the objections of NPO Energia, the station's prime contractor, which argued that FGBs were oversized and poorly suited for long-term use. The FGB-based Kvant-2 and Kristall modules were outfitted and launched to Mir in 1989 and 1990, respectively. However, as the space budget contracted—particularly after the dissolution of the Soviet Union—further development slowed. The Shuttle–Mir program, however, provided an infusion of U.S. funding and a need for additional laboratory space aboard Mir. This led to the outfitting and launch of the FGB-based Spektr and Priroda modules in 1995 and 1996, respectively.

NASA also directly funded the construction and 1998 launch of Zarya, the first module of the International Space Station, which was based on the FGB design. Under the NASA contract, Khrunichev also built a contingency flight spare, which was about 70% complete when work was halted. Roscosmos later funded its completion as Nauka, which launched to the ISS in 2021.
