= TKS (spacecraft) =

Soviet spacecraft conceived in the late 1960s

TKS spacecraft
- Applications: Crewed spacecraft to supply the military Almaz space station

Specifications
- Launch mass: 21,620 kg (47,660 lb)
- Payload capacity: 12,600 kg (27,800 lb)
- Crew capacity: 3
- Volume: 45 m^{3} (1,589 cu ft)
- Power: 2.4 kW (avg.)
- Regime: Low Earth orbit
- Design life: 7 days (free flight); 210 days (VA, docked to station)

Dimensions
- Length: 17.51 m (57 ft 5 in)
- Diameter: 4.15 m (13 ft 7 in)
- Solar array span: 17 m (55 ft 9 in)

Related spacecraft
- Launch vehicle: Proton-K

Main engine
- Propellant mass: 3,822 kg (8,426 lb)
- Maximum thrust: 7,840 N (1,760 lb_{f})
- Specific impulse: 291 s (2.85 km/s)
- Propellant: N_{2}O_{4} / UDMH

Configuration
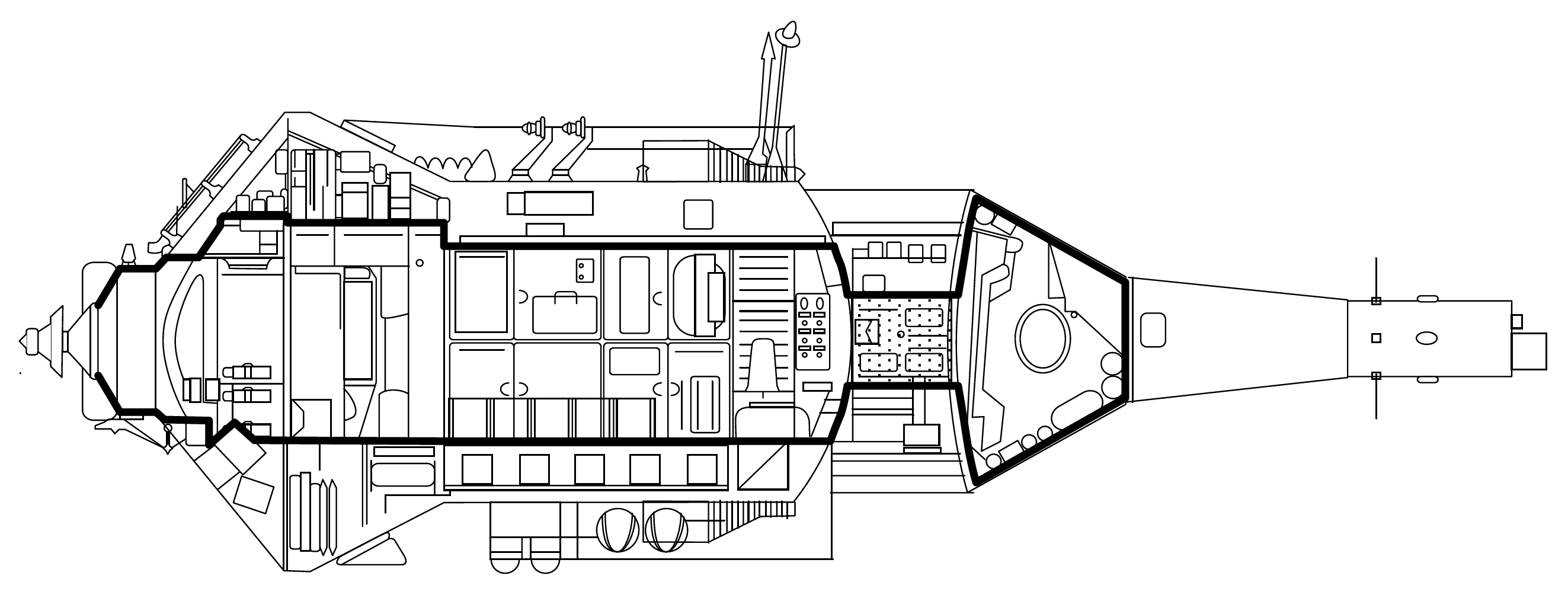
- Cutaway of TKS vehicle. Details are conjectural. The broad black line outlines the vehicle's pressurized compartments. A tunnel (stippled) connects the FGB and VA spacecraft

The TKS spacecraft (Russian: Транспортный корабль снабжения, Transportnyi Korabl’ Snabzheniia, lit. Transport Supply Spacecraft; GRAU index 11F72) was a Soviet spacecraft system developed in the late 1960s to deliver crew, cargo, and fuel to the military Almaz space stations. It consisted of two linked but independently operable parts: the VA spacecraft, a compact capsule for crew launch and re-entry, and the Functional Cargo Block (FGB), which provided cargo space, docking hardware, and the main orbital maneuvering engines. When the VA returned to earth, the FGB could be left behind at the station.

Although designed for both crewed and uncrewed flights, the TKS was never used operationally. Only four test missions were launched, three of which docked with civilian Salyut stations. The spacecraft's lasting contribution was its FGB design, which became the basis for station modules used on Mir and the International Space Station.

== Design ==
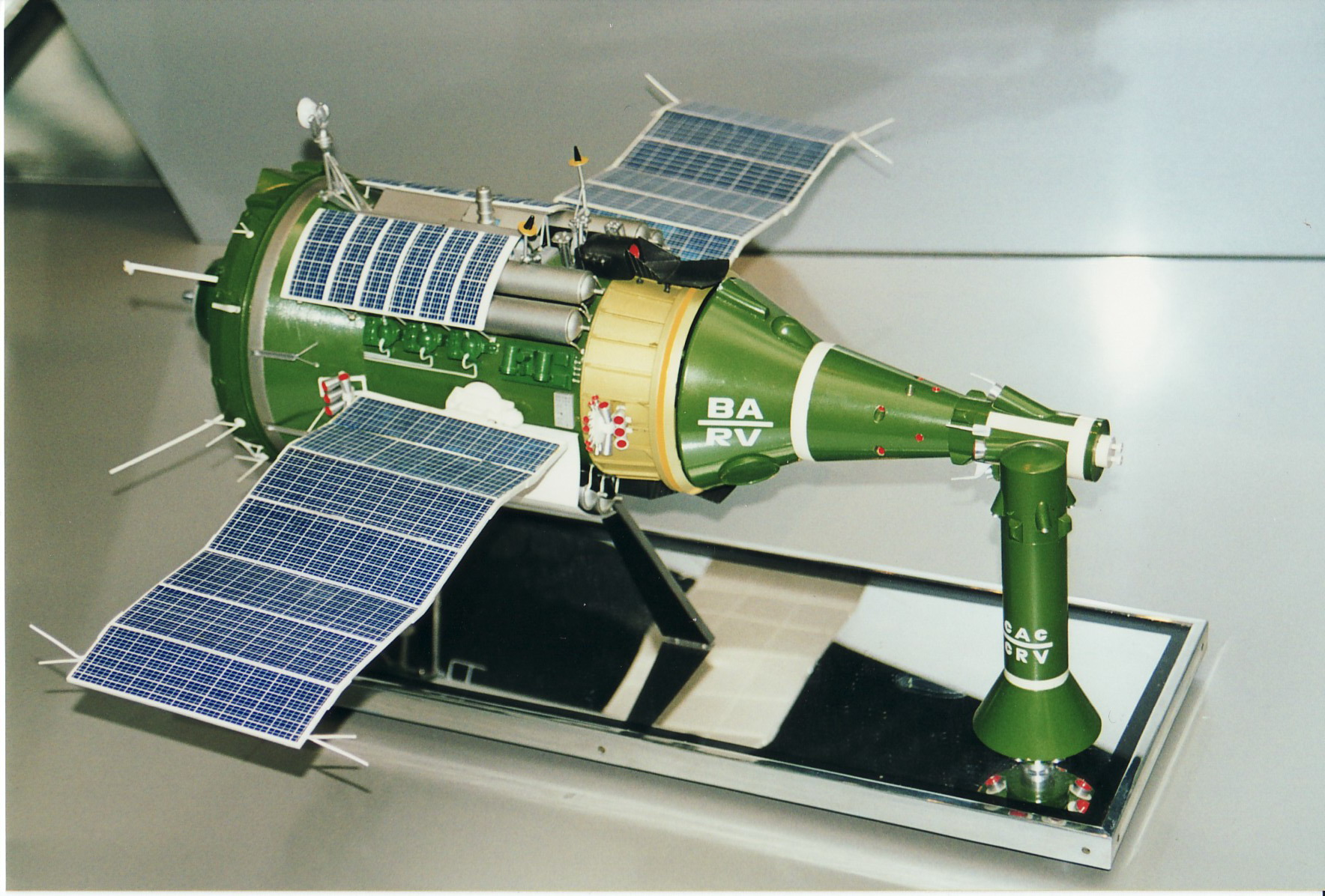
A model of a TKS spacecraft. On the left is the cylindrical Functional Cargo Block with attached solar panels. In the middle is the VA spacecraft, with the conical VA return capsule for the crew and the VA's orbital maneuvering engines in the long nose section. Standing right front is the launch escape system, which would have been attached to the top of the VA's nose section during launch and jettisoned after a successful launch.

The TKS was designed under Vladimir Chelomey (VA capsule) and V. N. Bugayskiy (FGB block) as a crewed alternative to the Soyuz spacecraft for servicing Almaz stations, launched on the Proton rocket. Development began in 1965, but by the time the first TKS flew in 1977 the Almaz programme was already winding down.

Four test flights of the VA capsule were conducted without the FGB to validate the design, each launching two capsules stacked together. On one flight the launch vehicle exploded, destroying the lower capsule, while the upper capsule successfully used its launch escape system. Four flights of the complete TKS (VA with FGB) were also launched: one as a systems test, and three that docked with Salyut stations to deliver cargo.

The FGB could also be launched independently as an autonomous uncrewed cargo module, a role that led to its adaptation as the basis for later space station modules. The VA was likewise considered for the "Almaz APOS" concept, in which a crew would have launched docked to an Almaz core inside a VA capsule.

=== TKS VA ===
The VA was a compact reentry capsule derived from Chelomei's earlier LK-1 circumlunar spacecraft and LK-700 lunar lander capsule designs. It resembled the Apollo Command Module but was about 30% smaller. The pressurized capsule carried its own life-support system, reaction control thrusters, deorbit engine, parachutes, and soft-landing rockets. It could operate autonomously for up to 31 hours and typically reentered within two orbits. In addition to a three-person crew, the VA could return up to 50 kilograms (110 lb) of cargo, mainly KSI film-return capsules. Unusually, its docking hatch was located on the aft side, requiring crews to enter and exit through an opening in the heat shield. Although extensively flight-tested, no VA ever carried a crew.

=== TKS FGB ===
The FGB provided cargo space, docking hardware, and the main orbital maneuvering engines. Crews accessed it through a short tunnel from the VA. At its aft end was a pilot station with controls and windows for manual docking with an Almaz station. Planned operational TKS flights would also have delivered KSI film-return capsules, stowed near the docking port and transferred to the VA spacecraft for return to Earth.

== Details ==
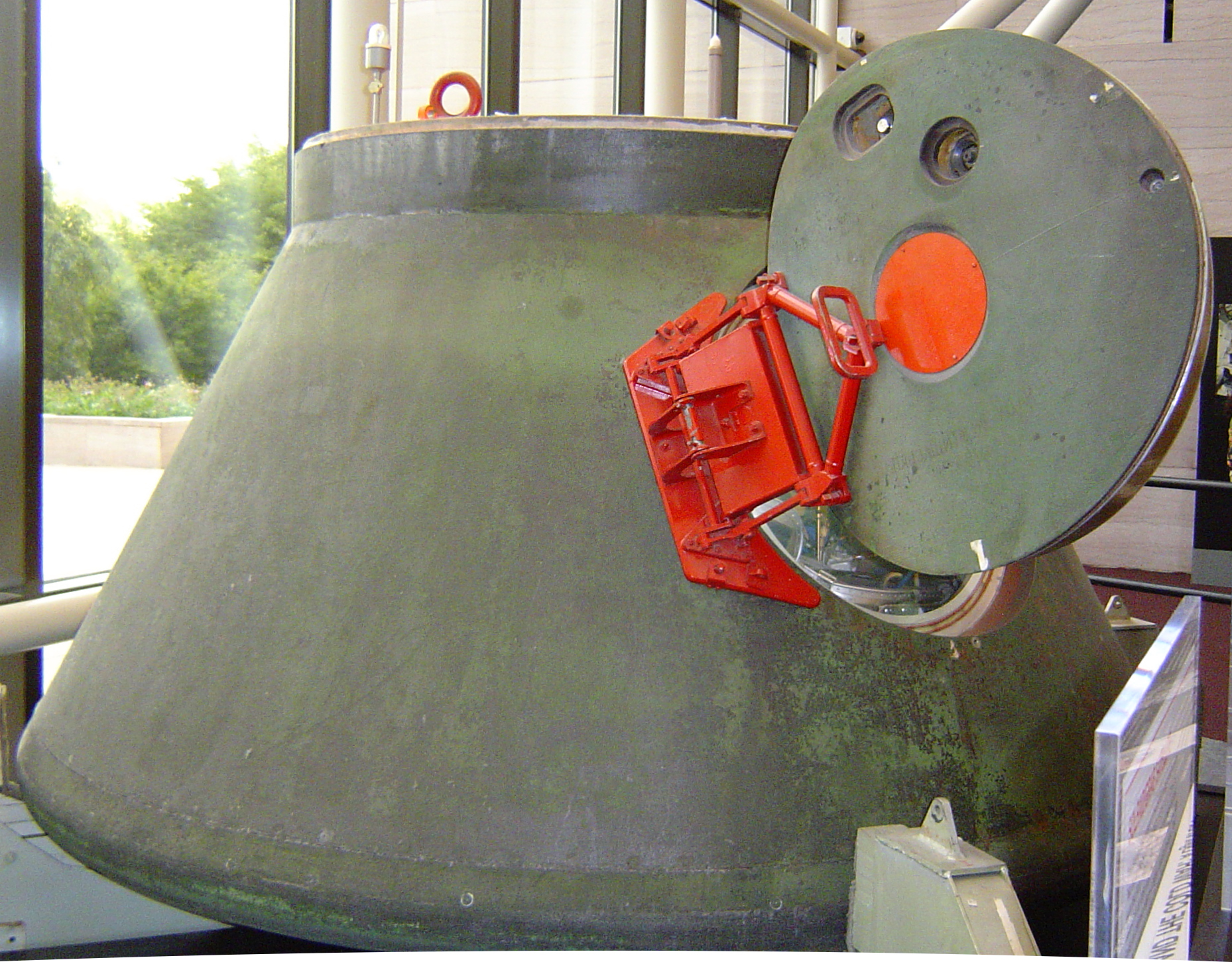
TKS VA return capsule of Kosmos 1443

Specifications
Crew size:	3
Design life:	7 days (free flight)
Orbital storage (VA):	200 days
Typical orbit:	223 × 266 km (139 × 165 mi) at 52° inclination
Length:	13.2 m (43 ft 4 in)
Maximal diameter:	4.15 m (13 ft 7 in)
Span:	17 m (55 ft 9 in)
Habitable volume:	45 m^{3} (1,600 cu ft)
Mass:	17,510 kg (38,600 lb)
Payload:	12,600 kg (27,700 lb)
Main-engine thrust:	7,840 N (1,760 lb_{f})
Main-engine propellants:	N_{2}O_{4} / UDMH, 3,822 kg (8,426 lb)
Main-engine I_{sp}:	291 s (2.85 km/s)
Spacecraft Δv:	700 m/s (2,290 ft/s)
Electrical system:	Solar panels, 40 m^{2} (430 sq ft)
Electric system:	2.4 kW average
Associated launch vehicle:	Proton-K

== Missions ==
=== VA spacecraft test flights ===
Four flights with eight VA spacecraft without an FGB module were conducted to speed up the development of the TKS spacecraft:

- Orbital test of a pair of two VA spacecraft Kosmos 881 and Kosmos 882 in 1976-12-15 that started jointly and reentered on the same day.
- VA #009L/P and VA #009P/P: Launched on 1977-08-04. Launch vehicle failure forty seconds into the flight on a suborbital test of two VA spacecraft. VA #009L/P is destroyed in the resulting booster explosion, VA #009P/P is rescued by the Proton SAS abort system and is recovered safely.
- On 1978-03-30 pair of two VA spacecraft Kosmos 997 and Kosmos 998 started jointly and reentered separately
- On 1979-05-23 pair of two VA spacecraft Kosmos 1100 and Kosmos 1101 that started jointly and reentered separately

=== TKS-1 (Kosmos 929) ===
Kosmos 929 was the first flight of a "complete" TKS spacecraft (VA spacecraft with FGB), launched on 17 July 1977 – it was a "solo" test flight and was not destined for a Salyut space station. The VA capsule returned to Earth 16 August 1977. The remainder of the spacecraft – the FGB – deorbited on 2 February 1978.

=== TKS-2 (Kosmos 1267) ===
On 25 April 1981, TKS-2 was launched uncrewed as Kosmos 1267, the first FGB to dock with a space station. After separation and recovery of the VA capsule on 24 May 1981, the FGB docked on 19 June with Salyut 6, after 57 days of autonomous flight. It remained attached to the station until both deorbited and were destroyed on 29 July 1982.

=== TKS-3 (Kosmos 1443) ===
On 2 March 1983, TKS-3 was launched uncrewed as Kosmos 1443. This time, the VA remained attached and the first "complete" TKS docked to Salyut 7 two days after launch. TKS-3 separated from the station on 14 August. After undocking, the FGB and the VA spacecraft separated and the VA spacecraft continued in space for four more days demonstrating autonomous flight, before the VA capsule successfully re-entered on 23 August 1983, landing 100 km south-east of Aralsk and returning 350 kg of material from the station. The FGB deorbited itself on 19 September 1983.

=== TKS-4 (Kosmos 1686) ===
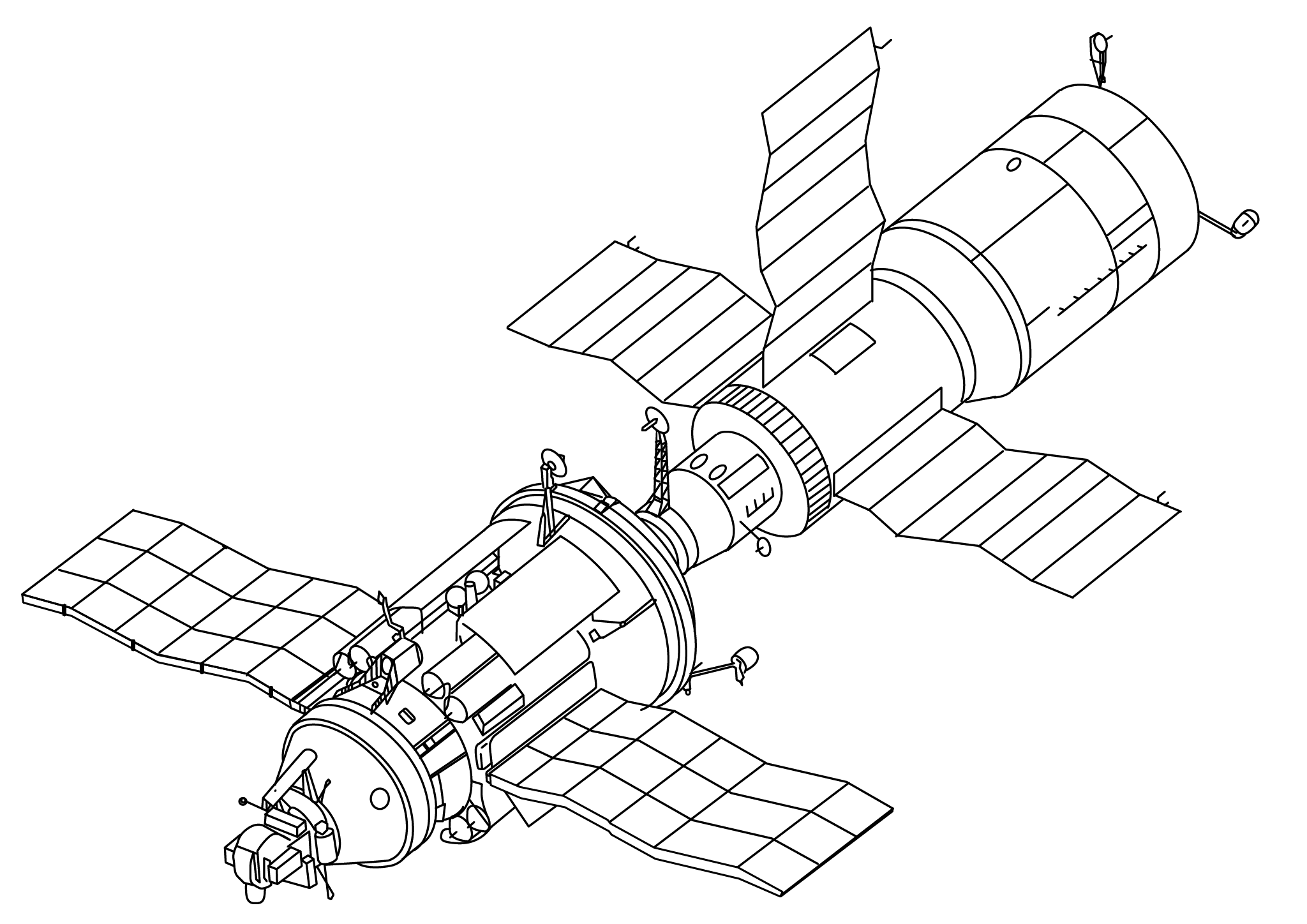
A drawing of the last flown TKS spacecraft, Kosmos 1686, depicted docked to the Salyut 7 space station. The VA capsule is visible on the bottom left. The "nose section" of the VA spacecraft, that would have contained the de-orbit engines for the VA capsule, has been replaced with remote sensing instruments.

TKS-4 was launched uncrewed as Kosmos 1686 on 27 September 1985. The VA capsule was stripped of its landing systems, environmental controls, seats, and crew interfaces, and outfitted instead with scientific payloads including a high-resolution camera, an infrared telescope and the Ozon spectrometer. It successfully docked with Salyut 7.

The "military" long-duration crew Salyut 7 EO-4—commander Vladimir Vasyutin, Viktor Savinykh, and Alexander Volkov—arrived the same month to conduct experiments with the equipment installed on TKS-4. Vasyutin soon became ill, forcing an early return to Earth on 21 November 1985 after just two months in orbit, cutting short the TKS program's planned work. The crew of Soyuz T-15 returned to Salyut 7 in May 1986, to conclude some of the experiments and ferry equipment to the then new Mir space station.

Salyut 7 was reboosted to a higher orbit after that mission in anticipation of further TKS flights, and the Buran shuttle. These never materialized, and Salyut 7 and Kosmos 1686 reentered together on 7 February 1991, burning up over Argentina.

== Further usage ==
After the Almaz program ended, KB Salyut, which had developed the FGB, was left to repurpose its small fleet of spacecraft. One served as a tug to deliver the Kvant-1 module to the Mir space station in March 1987, another formed the core of the Polyus spacecraft that was lost in the first launch of the Energia rocket in May. After that, several were adapted into permanent Mir modules, including Kvant-2 (1989), Kristall (1990), Spektr (1995), and Priroda (1996). NASA funding paid for the outfitting and launch of Zarya in 1998 as the first module of the International Space Station, while a flight spare for Zarya was completed as Nauka and finally reached the ISS in 2021.

In the 2010s, the private spaceflight company Excalibur Almaz acquired two surplus VA capsules with the intention of repurposing them as low-cost cargo return vehicles. The plan was never realized, and the company instead sold much of its hardware. One capsule was auctioned in 2014 for €1 million, while the other was reportedly removed from the company's Isle of Man headquarters in an undisclosed direction. The remaining equipment was announced as destined for educational display.

== Existing hardware ==
Some VA capsules are on display in museums or in storage.

Known articles include:

- #103/1 – Memorial Museum of Cosmonautics
- #103/2 – Excalibur Almaz
- #103/4 – Smithsonian Museum
- #009A/2 – Excalibur Almaz
- #009/2 – NPO Mashinostroyeniya
- #009/3 – Excalibur Almaz
- #? – International Space University, Strasbourg
- #? – Yevpatoria
- #? – NPO Energomash
- #? – Khrunichev State Research and Production Space Center
- #? – Vladimir Tchelomey School, Kazakhstan

== Gallery ==
TKS-based and descendant spacecraft and modules.

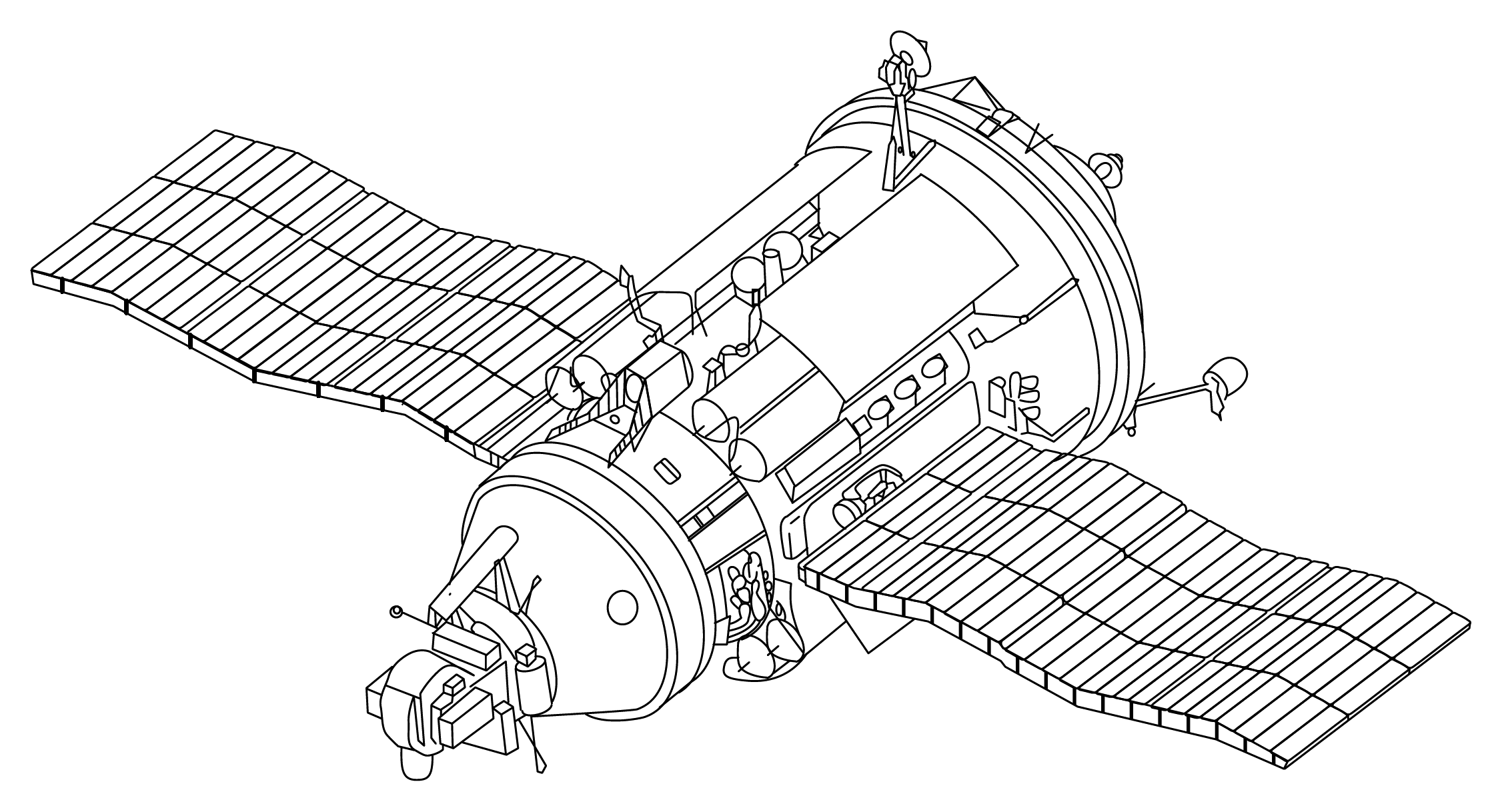
Kosmos 1686 with its VA capsule modified to house instruments

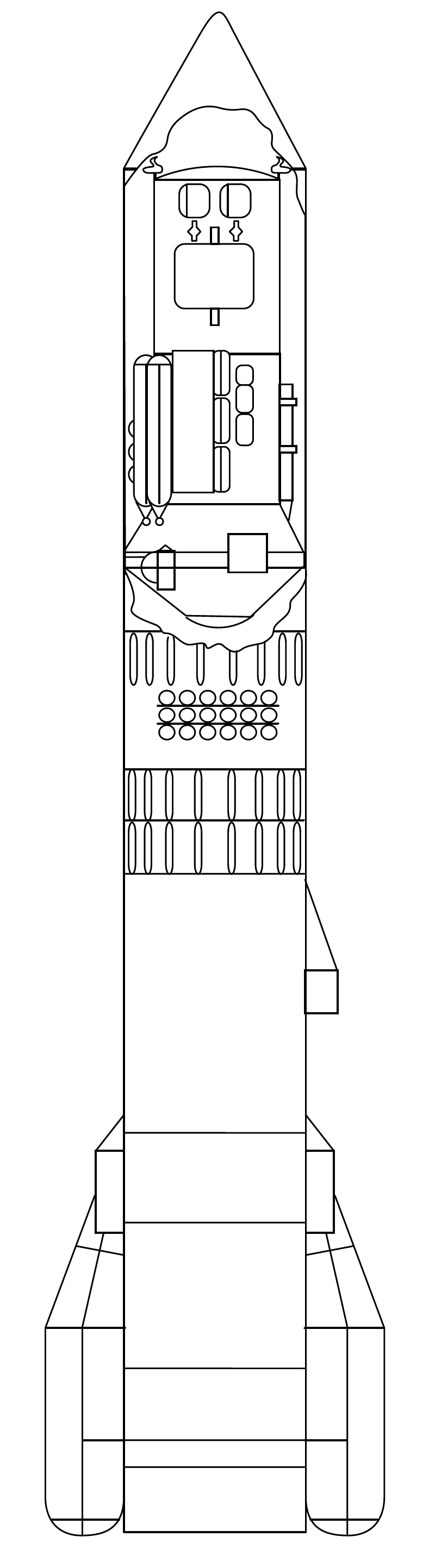
Cutaway view of Polyus spacecraft

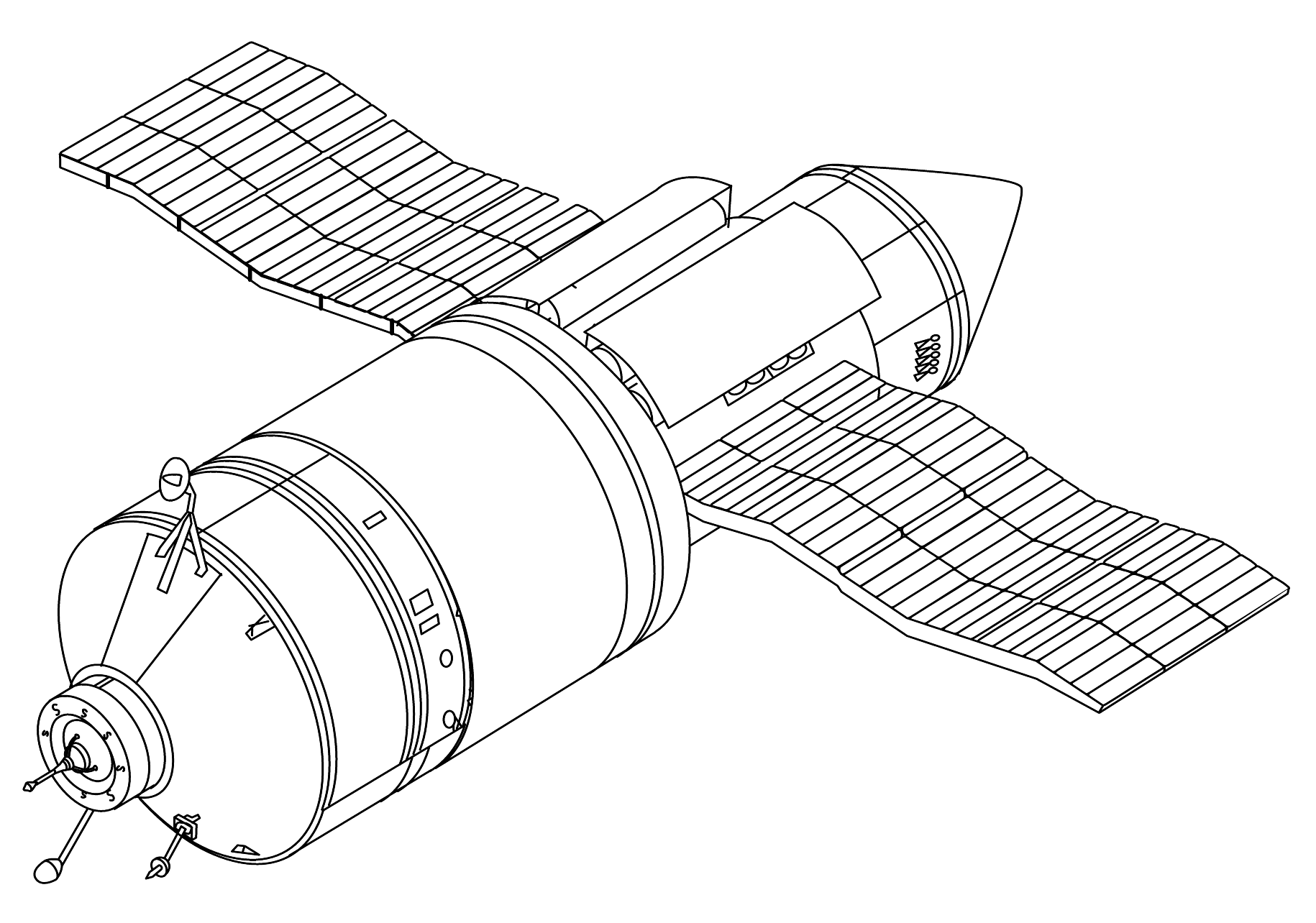
Kvant-1 with its orbital tug attached

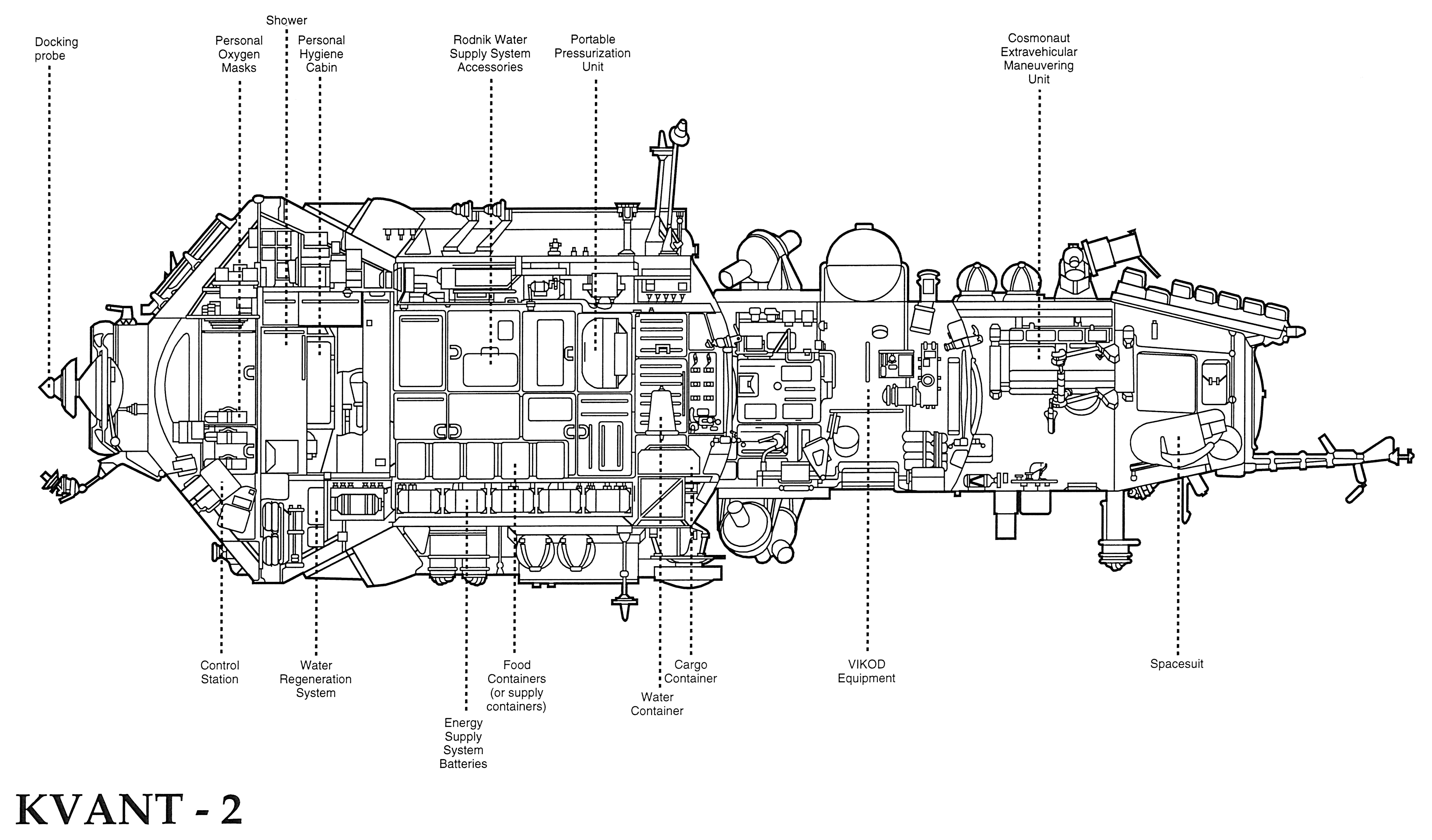
Cutaway view of Kvant-2

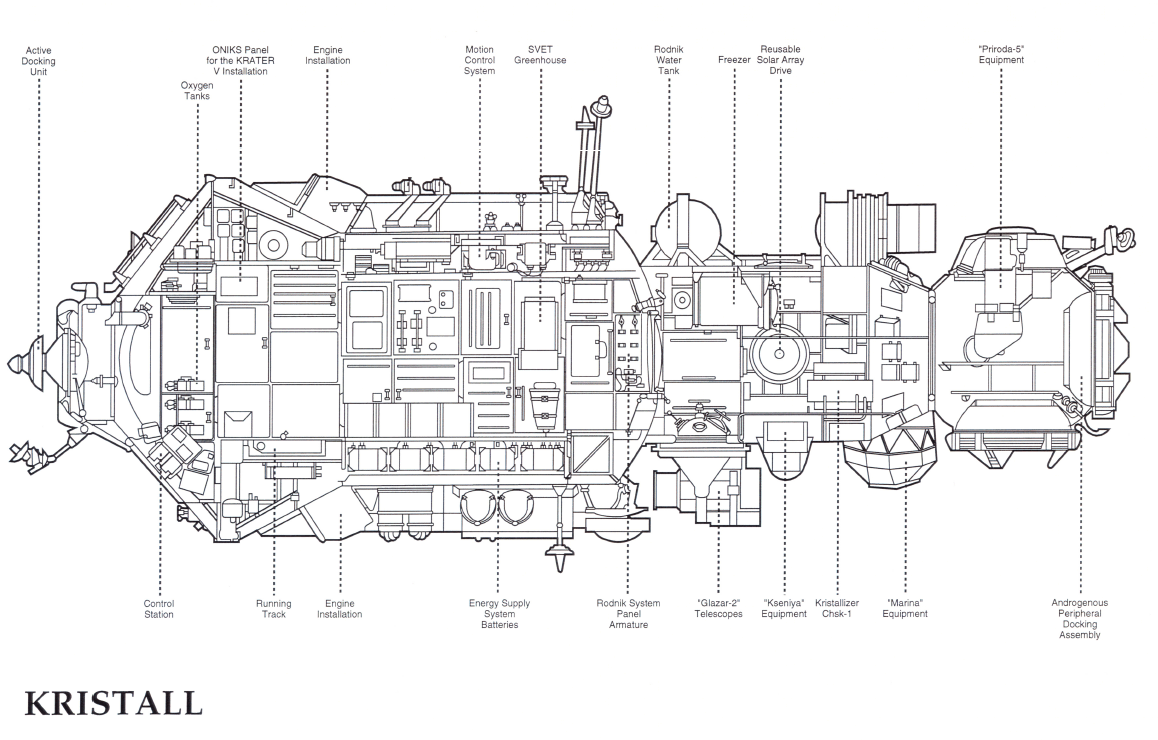
Cutaway view of Kristall

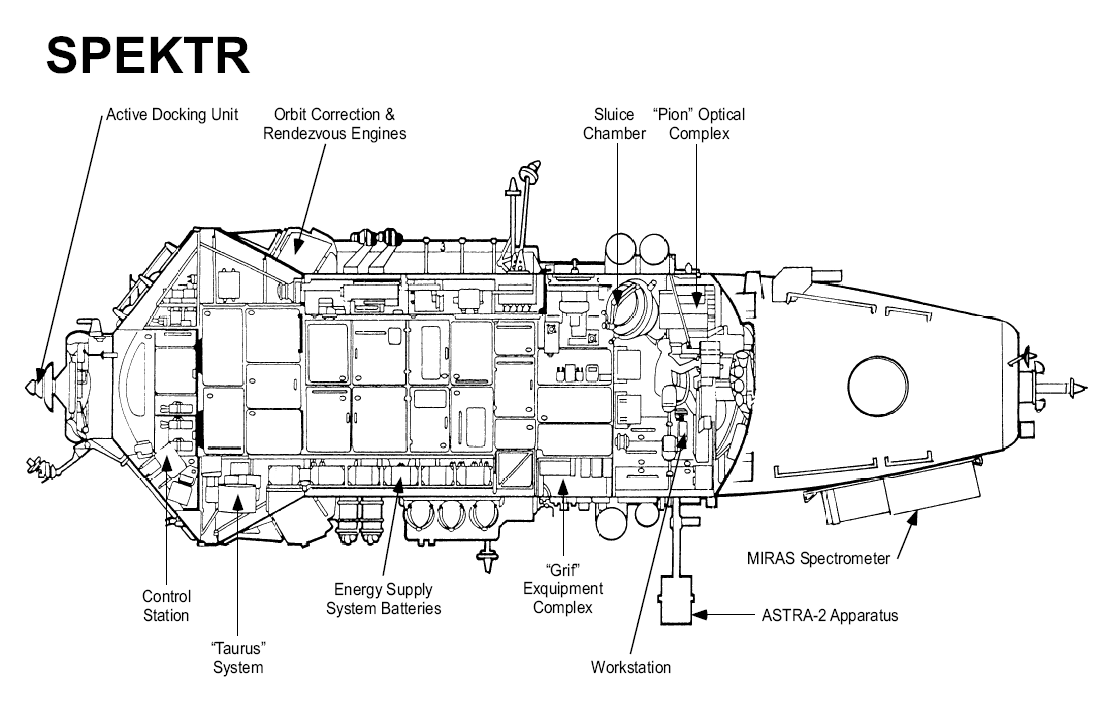
Cutaway view of Spektr

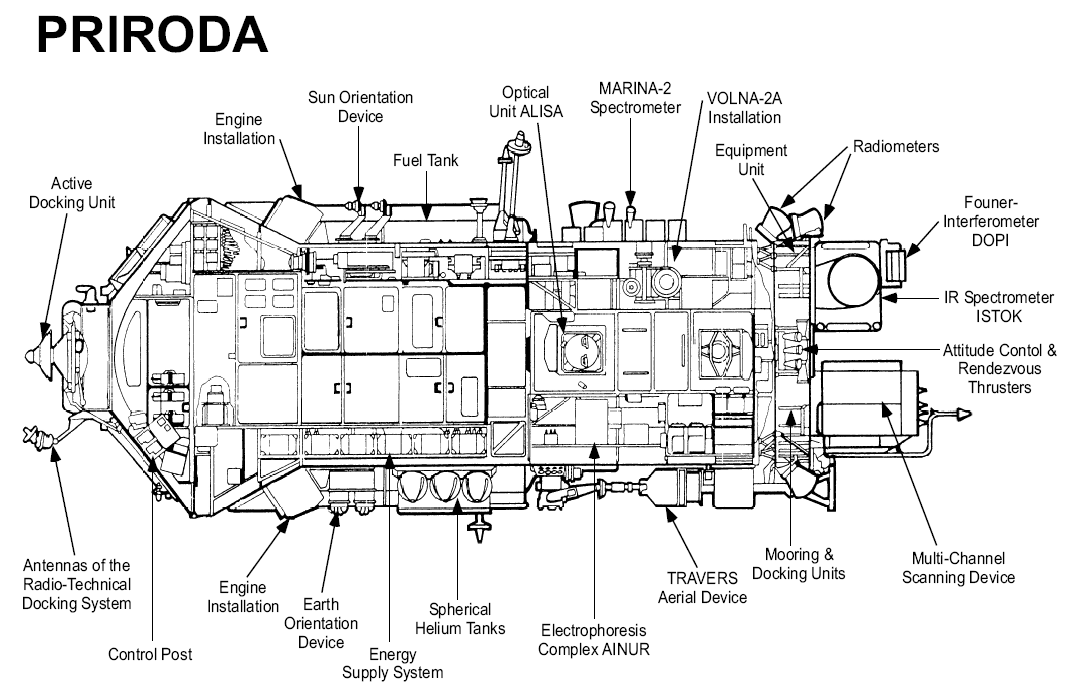
Cutaway view of Priroda

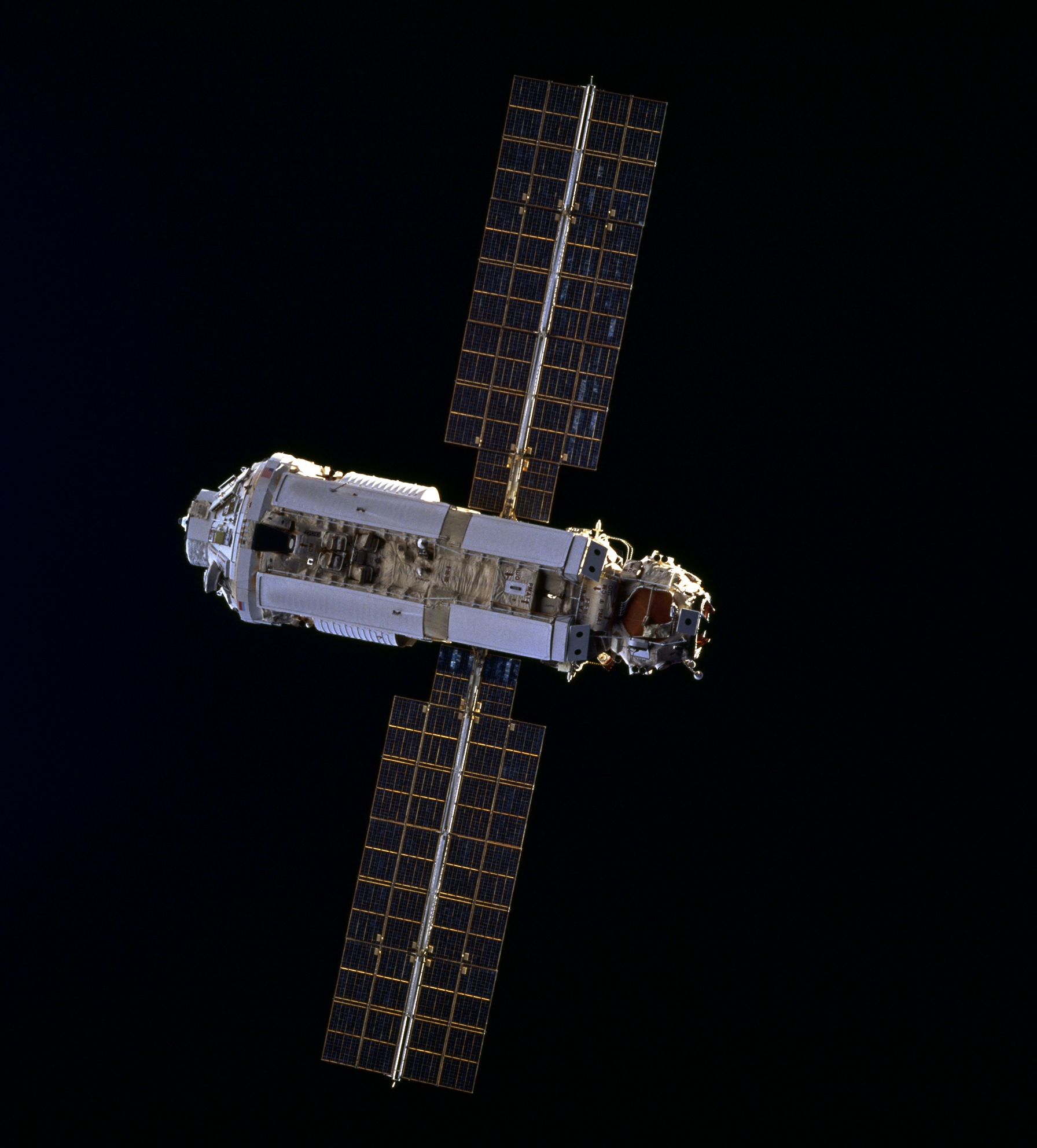
Zarya ISS module

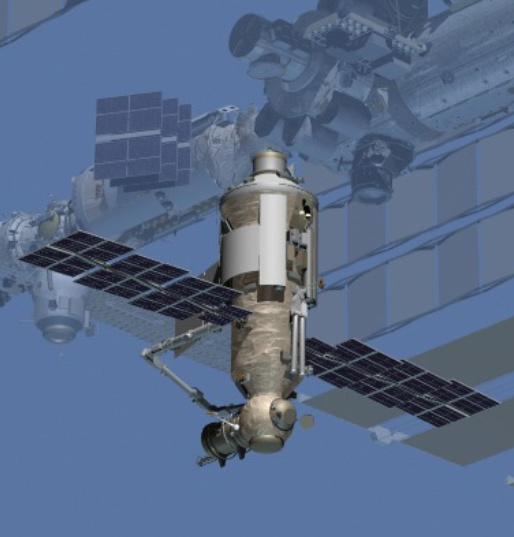
Nauka ISS module

== See also ==
- Big Gemini – Proposed U.S. equivalent to the TKS spacecraft
- Manned Orbiting Laboratory – U.S. Air Force equivalent to Almaz space station
