= List of space stations by country =

This list of space stations is grouped by countries responsible for their operations. The space stations where multiple countries are responsible for their operations are listed separately. Planned and canceled space stations are excluded from this list.

	Never crewed, prototype
^{‡}	Never crewed, non-prototype

== Chinese space stations ==
Name	Entity	Program	Crew size	Launch date	Reentry date	Days in orbit	Days occu- pied	Total crew and visitors	Number of crewed visits	Number of robotic visits	Mass (* = at launch)	Pressurized volume
Tiangong-1	(China) CMSA	Tiangong	3	29 September 2011	2 April 2018	2377	25	6	2	1	8,506 kg (18,753 lb)	15 m^{3} (530 ft^{3})
Tiangong-2	(China) CMSA	Tiangong	2	15 September 2016	19 July 2019	1037	26	2	1	1	8,506 kg (18,753 lb)	15 m^{3} (530 ft^{3})
Tiangong space station	(China) CMSA	Tiangong	3	29 April 2021	in orbit	2013	1883	30	10	8	22,600 kg (49,800 lb)	110 m^{3} (3,880 ft^{3}) (planned)

== Soviet/Russian space stations ==
Name	Entity	Program	Crew size	Launch date	Reentry date	Days in orbit	Days occu- pied	Total crew and visitors	Number of crewed visits	Number of robotic visits	Mass (* = at launch)	Pressurized volume
Salyut 1	(Soviet Union) USSR	DOS	3	19 April 1971	11 October 1971	175	24	6	2	0	18,425 kg (40,620 lb)	100 m^{3} (3,500 ft^{3})
DOS-2^{‡}	(Soviet Union) USSR	DOS	— (Note: The USSR intended to crew these stations with 2 men, however they re-entered the atmosphere before the cosmonauts were launched.)	29 July 1972	29 July 1972	failed to reach orbit	—	—	—	—	18,000 kg (40,000 lb)	—
Salyut 2^{‡}	(Soviet Union) USSR	Almaz	—	3 April 1973	16 April 1973	13	—	—	—	—	18,500 kg (40,800 lb)	—
Kosmos 557^{‡}	(Soviet Union) USSR	DOS	—	11 May 1973	22 May 1973	11	—	—	—	—	19,400 kg (42,800 lb)	—
Salyut 3	(Soviet Union) USSR	Almaz	2	25 May 1974	24 January 1975	213	15	2	1	0	18,900 kg (41,700 lb)*	90 m^{3} (3,200 ft^{3})
Salyut 4	(Soviet Union) USSR	DOS	2	26 December 1974	3 February 1977	770	92	4	2	1	18,900 kg (41,700 lb)*	90 m^{3} (3,200 ft^{3})
Salyut 5	(Soviet Union) USSR	Almaz	2	22 June 1976	8 August 1977	412	67	4	3	0	19,000 kg (42,000 lb)*	100 m^{3} (3,500 ft^{3})
Salyut 6	(Soviet Union) USSR	DOS	2	29 September 1977	29 July 1982	1764	683	33	16	14	19,000 kg (42,000 lb)	90 m^{3} (3,200 ft^{3})
Salyut 7	(Soviet Union) USSR	DOS	3	19 April 1982	7 February 1991	3216	861	22	10	15	19,000 kg (42,000 lb)	90 m^{3} (3,200 ft^{3})
Mir	(Soviet Union) USSR; Roscosmos	DOS	3	19 February 1986 (Note: Launch date of the initial module. Additional modules for this station were launched later.)	23 March 2001	5511	4594	125	39	68	129,700 kg (285,900 lb)	350 m^{3} (12,400 ft^{3})

== United States space stations ==
Name	Entity	Program	Crew size	Launch date	Reentry date	Days in orbit	Days occu- pied	Total crew and visitors	Number of crewed visits	Number of robotic visits	Mass (* = at launch)	Pressurized volume
OPS 0855	USAF	MOL	—	3 November 1966	9 January 1967	67	—	—	—	—	9,680 kg (21,340 lb)	11.3 m^{3} (400 ft^{3})
Skylab	NASA	Skylab	3	14 May 1973	11 July 1979	2249	171	9	3	0	77,088 kg (169,950 lb)	360 m^{3} (12,700 ft^{3})
Genesis I	(United States) Bigelow Aerospace		—	12 July 2006	(In Orbit)	7418	—	—	—	—	1,360 kg (3,000 lb)	11.5 m^{3} (410 ft^{3})
Genesis II	(United States) Bigelow Aerospace		—	28 June 2007	(In Orbit)	7067	—	—	—	—	1,360 kg (3,000 lb)	11.5 m^{3} (406 ft^{3})
