= Soyuz 14 =

1974 Soviet crewed spaceflight to Salyut 3

- Mission type: Salyut 3 crew transport
- Operator: Soviet space program
- COSPAR ID: 1974-051A
- SATCAT no.: 7361
- Mission duration: 15 days, 17 hours and 30 minutes
- Orbits completed: 255

Spacecraft properties
- Spacecraft: Soyuz 7K-T No.3
- Spacecraft type: Soyuz 7K-T/A9
- Manufacturer: OKB-1
- Launch mass: 6,570 kg (14,480 lb)
- Landing mass: 1,200 kg (2,600 lb)

Crew
- Crew size: 2
- Members: Pavel Popovich; Yuri Artyukhin
- Callsign: Беркут (Berkut - "Golden Eagle")

Start of mission
- Launch date: 3 July 1974, 18:51:08 UTC
- Rocket: Soyuz 11A511
- Launch site: Baikonur 1/5

End of mission
- Landing date: 19 July 1974, 12:21:36 UTC
- Landing site: 140 km (87 mi) at the southeast of Dzhezkazgan, Kazakhstan

Orbital parameters
- Reference system: Geocentric orbit
- Regime: Low Earth orbit
- Perigee altitude: 250 km (160 mi)
- Apogee altitude: 277 km (172 mi)
- Inclination: 51.60°
- Period: 89.70 minutes

Docking with Salyut 3
- Docking date: 3 July 1974, 21:00 UTC
- Undocking date: 19 July 1974, 09:03 UTC
- Time docked: 15 days, 12 hours and 3 minutes
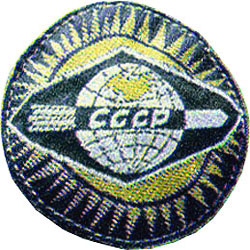
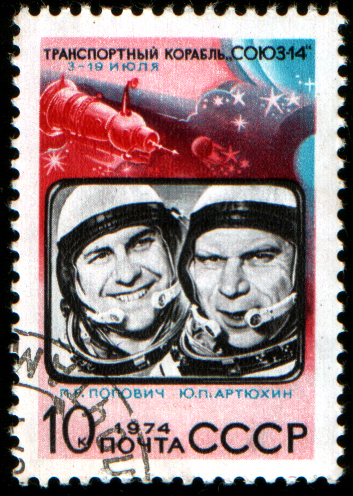
- Vimpel Diamond for entrainment patch Soviet stamp featuring Popovich and Artyukhin (1974) Soyuz programme

Soyuz 14 (Russian: Союз 14, Union 14) was a July, 1974, crewed spaceflight to the Salyut 3 space station. Soyuz 14 is also the name given to the Soyuz spacecraft which was used to bring the cosmonauts to and from the station. The mission was part of the Soviet Union's Almaz program to evaluate the military applications of crew spaceflight. The mission's crew members were cosmonauts Pavel Popovich and Yuri Artyukhin. At the time, the military nature of this mission and the station itself were not acknowledged by Soviet authorities.

The flight was the first successful mission to a space station by the Soviets. The mission proved to be the only one for Salyut 3 as Soyuz 15 failed to dock with the station in August 1974 and the station was de-orbited in January 1975. With the American Skylab missions now complete, the flight marked the start of the monopoly of crewed space activities by the Soviets until the 1981 launch of STS-1, the first Space Shuttle flight, save for the joint Apollo–Soyuz flight of 1975.

== Crew ==
Position	Cosmonaut
Commander	Pavel Popovich; Second and last spaceflight
Flight engineer	Yuri Artyukhin; Only spaceflight

=== Backup crew ===
Position	Cosmonaut
Commander	Gennady Sarafanov
Flight engineer	Lev Dyomin

=== Reserve crew ===
Position	Cosmonaut
Commander	Boris Volynov
Flight engineer	Vitaly Zholobov

== Mission parameters ==
- Mass: 6,570 kg (14,480 lb)
- Perigee: 250.0 km (155.3 mi)
- Apogee: 277.0 km (172.1 mi)
- Inclination: 51.60°
- Period: 89.70 minutes

== Mission highlights ==
With the Salyut 3 space station successfully launched on 24 June 1974, Soyuz 14 was sent into orbit nine days later, on 3 July 1974. The craft docked with the space station the next day, performing a manual approach for the last 100 metres. The crew tested the suitability of Salyut 3 as a crewed military reconnaissance platform. They also tested Almaz station systems, such as the solar arrays. Increased solar activity raised safety issues, but it was decided radiation levels were within safe limits, so the flight continued.

Experiments were described by the Soviets, but analysts presumed that much time was taken up with unreported military activities. Claims were made in the aerospace press that objects were laid out at the Baikonur Cosmodrome to photograph to test a high-resolution camera system on board. Some of the experiments the Soviets described included studies of the heart and circulatory systems in orbit, studies of intracranial pressure, monitoring of blood composition, measuring of lung capacity and inhalation/exhalation rates and the testing of a water purification system which condensed moisture from the station's atmosphere.

The cosmonauts exercised for two hours each day to counter the effects of weightlessness. Because of this, they were able to climb from their Soyuz descent module without assistance when their flight ended on 19 July 1974. The crew left enough supplies on Salyut 3 to last the next crew at least six months.
