= Salyut 3 =

Soviet space station (1974–1975)

Salyut 3 (OPS-2 / Almaz 2)

Station statistics
- COSPAR ID: 1974-046A
- SATCAT no.: 07342
- Call sign: Salyut 3
- Crew: 2
- Launch: 25 June 1974, 04:15:00 UTC
- Carrier rocket: Proton-K No. 283-01
- Launch pad: Baikonur, Site 81/23
- Reentry: 24 January 1975
- Mass: 18,900 kg (41,700 lb) at launch
- Length: 14.55 m (47.7 ft)
- Diameter: 4.15 m (13.6 ft) max.
- Pressurised volume: 90 m^{3} (3,200 cu ft)
- Periapsis altitude: Initial: 219 km (136 mi; 118 nmi); Final: 268 km (167 mi; 145 nmi)
- Apoapsis altitude: Initial: 270 km (170 mi; 150 nmi); Final: 272 km (169 mi; 147 nmi)
- Orbital inclination: 51.6°
- Orbital period: 89.1 minutes
- Days in orbit: 213 days
- Days occupied: 15 days
- Statistics as of de-orbit and reentry
- Configuration
- Salyut 3 diagram

Salyut 3 (Russian: Салют-3, lit. 'Salute 3', also known as OPS-2 or Almaz 2) was a Soviet space station launched on 25 June 1974. It was the second Almaz military space station, and the first such station to be launched successfully. It was included in the Salyut program to disguise its true military nature. Due to the military nature of the station, the Soviet Union was reluctant to release information about its design, and about the missions relating to the station.

It attained an altitude of 219 to 270 km on launch and NASA reported its final orbital altitude was 268 to 272 km. Only one of the three intended crews successfully boarded and operated the station, brought by Soyuz 14. Soyuz 15 attempted to bring a second crew but failed to dock, after which the third planned mission to the station was cancelled.

Although little official information has been released about the station, several sources report that it contained multiple Earth-observation cameras, as well as an on-board gun. The station was deorbited and re-entered the atmosphere on 24 January 1975. The next space station launched by the Soviet Union was the civilian station Salyut 4; the next military station was Salyut 5, which was the final Almaz space station.

== Background ==
The first space station, Salyut 1 (also known as DOS-1), was launched by the Soviet Union in April 1971. Only one mission successfully docked with Salyut 1, this was Soyuz 11. Its three-person crew spent 22 days aboard the station in June 1971. Tragically, the crew was killed just before reentry when an airlock opened prematurely, after undocking from the station.

At the time, the Soviet Union had competing "civilian" and military space programs. Salyut 1, was developed under the civilian program. These civilian stations, were also known as Long-term Orbital Stations (DOS). Successors to Salyut 1 included the unsuccessful DOS-2 in 1972 and DOS-3 in 1974, followed by the successful launches of Salyut 4, Salyut 6, and Salyut 7.

The military space stations, known as Almaz stations or Orbital Piloted Stations (OPS), were similar in size and shape to the civilian DOS stations. However, their designs, attributed to Vladimir Chelomey, were significantly different. To conceal their military purpose, these stations were also publicly designated as Salyut stations. The first Almaz station, Salyut 2, launched in April 1973 but failed within days of reaching orbit and was never crewed.

== Description ==
Salyut 3 consisted of an airlock chamber, a large-diameter work compartment, and a small-diameter living compartment, giving a total habitable volume of 90 cubic metres (3,200 cu ft). It had two solar arrays, one docking port, and two main engines, each of which could produce 400 kilograms-force (3,900 N; 880 lbf) of thrust. Its launch mass was 18,900 kilograms (41,700 lb).

The station came equipped with a shower, a standing sleeping station, as well as a foldaway bed. The floor was covered with Velcro to assist the cosmonauts moving around the station. Some entertainment on the station included a magnetic chess set, a small library, and a cassette deck with some audio cassette tapes. Exercise equipment included a treadmill and Pingvin exercise suit. The first water-recycling facilities were tested on the station; the system was called Priboy.

=== Earth-observation cameras ===
The work compartment was dominated by the Agat-1 Earth-observation telescope, which had a focal length of 6.375 metres (20.92 ft) and an optical resolution better than three metres, according to post-Soviet sources; NASA historian Siddiqi has speculated that given the size of the telescope's mirror, it likely had a resolution better than one metre (3 ft 3 in). The telescope was used in conjunction with a wide-film camera and primarily for military reconnaissance. The cosmonauts are said to have observed targets set out on the ground at Baikonur. Secondary objectives included the study of water pollution, agricultural land, possible ore-bearing landforms, and oceanic ice formation.

The cosmonauts were able to develop film while on the station. Important or interesting images were printed and then scanned by a TV imaging system for broadcast to Earth. They needed as little as 30 minutes to shoot, develop, and scan a photograph. Less important images were packed into a small Earth-return capsule, which could be ejected from the station.

In addition to the Agat-1 camera, other cameras on board included a topographical camera, a star camera, and a Volga infrared camera with a resolution of 100 metres (330 ft). Cosmonaut Pavel Popovich, who visited the station as the commander of Soyuz 14, recalled that the station was equipped with 14 cameras.

=== On-board gun ===
The Salyut 3, although called a "civilian" station, was equipped with a "self-defence" gun which had been designed for use aboard the station, and whose design is attributed to Alexander Nudelman. Some accounts claim the station was equipped with a Nudelman-Rikhter "Vulkan" gun, which was a variant of the 23 mm Nudelman aircraft cannon, or possibly a Nudelman NR-30 30 mm gun. Later Russian sources indicate that the gun was the virtually unknown (in the West) Rikhter R-23. These claims have reportedly been verified by Pavel Popovich, who had visited the station in orbit, as commander of Soyuz 14. Due to the potential shaking of the station, in-orbit tests of the weapon with cosmonauts in the station were ruled out. The gun was fixed to the station in such a way that the only way to aim would have been to change the orientation of the entire station. Following the last crewed mission to the station, the gun was commanded by the ground to be fired; some sources say it was fired to depletion, while other sources say three test firings took place during the Salyut 3 mission.

== Station operations ==
Only one crewed spacecraft, Soyuz 14, docked with Salyut 3. One other spacecraft, Soyuz 15, came within 40 metres of the station, but failed to dock due to a malfunctioning rendezvous system.

=== Launch ===
The station was launched on 25 June 1974 by a three-stage Proton launch vehicle.

Salyut 3 was the first space station to maintain its constant orientation relative to the Earth's surface. To achieve that, as many as 500,000 firings of the attitude control thrusters had been performed. Its initial orbit was 219 km by 270 km above mean sea level, which was considered low. The suspicions of Western observers were raised by the low altitude, combined with the choice of a crew from the Soviet Air Force, and the use of radio frequencies normally designated for military use.

=== Soyuz 14 ===
On 4 July, a little over a week after Salyut 3 was launched, the crewed spacecraft Soyuz 14 docked with the station, having been launched the previous day. The crew of Soyuz 14 consisted of commander Pavel Popovich and flight engineer Yury Artyukhin. The crew spent 15 days aboard the station.

On 9 July, it was reported that the crew activated the Earth-observation cameras, and spent several days taking photos of various locations, including central Asia. They placed some film in the Earth return capsule. After undocking, Soyuz 14 safely landed on 19 July.

=== Soyuz 15 ===
The spacecraft Soyuz 15 was launched on 26 August 1974, carrying a two-man crew consisting of commander Gennadi Sarafanov and flight engineer Lev Demin. They were intended to be the second crew to man Salyut 3, but failed to dock. The Igla rendezvous system on their Soyuz spacecraft malfunctioned, and the crew was unable to dock manually. Due to the limited battery life of their Soyuz spacecraft, they de-orbited and landed two days after launch. At the time of the spaceflight, Demin was 48 years old, earning him the record for the oldest person to fly in space up to that point. This record was broken the following year, with Deke Slayton's spaceflight as a part of the Apollo–Soyuz Test Project.

=== Uncrewed operations ===
Following the failed docking of Soyuz 15, it was decided that the Igla docking system needed significant modifications. Due to the amount of time needed to make the changes, and the limited time Salyut 3 had left in orbit due to orbital decay, the next planned mission to the station was cancelled. The spacecraft which would have been used on the third mission to Salyut 3 was later used for the mission Soyuz 20 to Salyut 4 (a civilian space station).

Following this decision, on 23 September 1974, the station's Earth return capsule was released. The ejected capsule was deorbited by small engines. NASA sources report that the parachute of Salyut 3's capsule opened at an altitude of 8.4 km. Other sources say the main parachute did not open, and the capsule was deformed upon landing, but that all the film was recoverable.

Also following the decision to not send any more cosmonauts to the station, the on-board gun was commanded by the ground to be fired; some sources say it was fired to depletion, while other sources say three test firings took place at the end of the mission.

The station was deorbited on 24 January 1975 over the Pacific Ocean.

== See also ==
- TKS spacecraft
