= Salyut programme =

Soviet space station programme

- Салют Космическая Программа; Salyut Kosmicheskaya Programma
- Salyut programme insignia

Program overview
- Country: Soviet Union
- Purpose: Space station
- Status: Completed

Programme history
- Duration: 1971–1986
- First flight: Salyut 1
- First crewed flight: Soyuz 10
- Last flight: Soyuz T-15
- Successes: 71
- Failures: 10
- Launch site: Baikonur

Vehicle information
- Crewed vehicle: Soyuz
- Crew capacity: 3
- Launch vehicle: Proton-K

The Salyut programme (Russian: Салют, IPA: [sɐˈlʲut], meaning "salute" or "fireworks") was the first space station programme, undertaken by the Soviet Union. It involved a series of four crewed scientific research space stations and two crewed military reconnaissance space stations over a period of 15 years, from 1971 to 1986. Two other Salyut launches failed. In one respect, Salyut had the space-race task of carrying out long-term research into the problems of living in space and a variety of astronomical, biological and Earth-resources experiments, and on the other hand, the USSR used this civilian programme as a cover for the highly secretive military Almaz stations, which flew under the Salyut designation. Salyut 1, the first station in the program, became the world's first crewed space station.

Salyut flights broke several spaceflight records, including several mission-duration records, and achieved the first orbital handover of a space station from one crew to another, and various spacewalk records. The ensuing Soyuz programme was vital for evolving space station technology from a basic, engineering development stage, from single docking port stations to complex, multi-ported, long-term orbital outposts with impressive scientific capabilities, whose technological legacy continues as of 2023. Experience gained from the Salyut stations paved the way for multimodular space stations such as Mir and the International Space Station (ISS), with each of those stations possessing a Salyut-derived core module at its heart.

Mir-2 (DOS-8), the final spacecraft from the Salyut series, became one of the first modules of the ISS. The first module of the ISS, the Russian-made Zarya, relied heavily on technologies developed in the Salyut programme.

== History of Salyut space stations ==
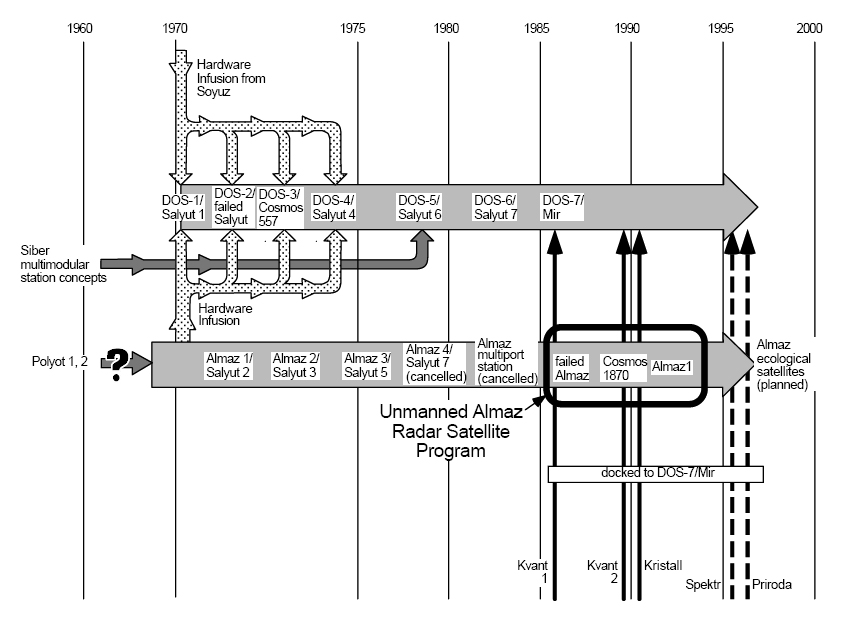
Development of the Soviet space stations:
- The large horizontal arrows trace the evolution of the two Soviet space station programmes DOS (top) and Almaz-OPS (bottom)
- Dark gray arrows trace the infusions from the Soyuz and OPS programmes to DOS
- Solid and dashed black arrows indicate modules intended for Mir, containing influences from OPS with the addition of space tugs

The programme was composed of DOS (Durable Orbital Station) civilian stations and OPS (Orbital Piloted Station) military stations:

- The Almaz-OPS space station cores were designed in October 1964 by Vladimir Chelomey's NPO Mashinostroyeniya (OKB-52) organization as military space stations, long before the Salyut programme started. For Salyut, small modifications had to be made to the docking port of the OPS to accommodate Soyuz spacecraft in addition to TKS spacecraft.
- The civilian DOS space station cores were designed by Sergei Korolev's OKB-1 organisation. Korolev and Chelomey had been in fierce competition in the Soviet space industry during the time of the Soviet crewed lunar programme, but OKB-52's Almaz-OPS hull design was combined with subsystems derived from OKB-1's Soyuz. This was done beginning with conceptual work in August 1969. The DOS differed from the OPS modules in several aspects, including extra solar panels, front and (in Salyut 6 and 7) rear docking ports for Soyuz spacecraft and TKS spacecraft, and finally more docking ports in DOS-7 and DOS-8 to attach further space station modules.

It was realized that the later civilian DOS stations could not only offer a cover story for the military Almaz programme, but could also be finished within one year and at least a year earlier than Almaz. The Salyut programme begun on 15 February 1970 on the condition that the crewed lunar programme would not suffer. However, the engineers at OKB-1 perceived the L3 lunar lander effort as a dead-end and immediately switched to working on DOS. In the end it turned out that the Soviet N1 "Moon Shot" rocket never flew successfully, so OKB-1's decision to abandon the lunar programme and derive a DOS space station from existing Soyuz subsystems and an Almaz/OPS hull proved to be right: The actual time from the DOS station's inception to the launch of the first DOS-based Salyut 1 space station took only 16 months; the world's first space station was launched by the Soviet Union, two years before the American Skylab or the first Almaz/OPS station flew.

Initially, the space stations were to be named Zarya, the Russian word for "Dawn". However, as the launch of the first station in the programme was prepared, it was realised that this would conflict with the call sign Zarya of the RKA Mission Control Center (TsUP) in Korolyov – therefore the name of the space stations was changed to Salyut shortly before launch of Salyut 1. Another explanation given is that the name might have offended the Chinese, who purportedly were preparing a new rocket for launch, which they had already named Shuguang or "Dawn". The Salyut programme was managed by Kerim Kerimov, chairman of the state commission for Soyuz missions.

A total of nine space stations were launched in the Salyut programme, with six successfully hosting crews and setting some records along the way. However, it was the stations Salyut 6 and Salyut 7 that became the workhorses of the programme. Out of the total of 1,697 days of occupancy that all Salyut crews achieved, Salyut 6 and 7 accounted for 1,499. While Skylab already featured a second docking port, these two Salyut stations became the first that actually utilised two docking ports: this made it possible for two Soyuz spacecraft to dock at the same time for crew exchange of the station and for Progress spacecraft to resupply the station, allowing for the first time a continuous ("permanent") occupation of space stations.

The heritage of the Salyut programme continued to live on in the first multi-module space station Mir with the Mir Core Module ("DOS-7"), that accumulated 4,592 days of occupancy, and in the International Space Station (ISS) with the Zvezda module ("DOS-8"), that as of 21 August 2012 accumulated 4,310 days of occupancy. Furthermore, the Functional Cargo Block space station modules were derived from the Almaz programme, with the Zarya ISS module being still in operation together with Zvezda.

=== First generation – The first space stations ===
The first generation served as a space station engineering test bed. The aim from the beginning of the Almaz program was to construct long-living multi-modular stations.

==== Salyut 1 (DOS-1) ====
Salyut 1 (Russian: Салют-1, lit. 'Salute 1'), also known as DOS-1 (Durable Orbital Station 1), was the world's first space station. It was launched into low Earth orbit by the Soviet Union on April 19, 1971. Salyut 1 was adapted from an Almaz airframe and comprised five components: a transfer compartment, a main compartment, two auxiliary compartments, and the Orion 1 Space Observatory. It was visited by the Soyuz 10 and Soyuz 11 missions. While the crew of Soyuz 10 was able to soft dock, the hard-docking failed, forcing the crew to abort their mission. The Soyuz 11 crew successfully docked, spending 23 days aboard Salyut 1 conducting experiments. The Soyuz 11 crew died of asphyxia caused by a valve failure just before reentry, making them the only humans to have died above the Kármán line.

Following the deaths, the mission of Salyut 1 was terminated, and the station reentered Earth's atmosphere, burning up on October 11, 1971.

==== DOS-2 ====
DOS-2 was lost in a launch failure on 29 July 1972, when the failure of the second stage of its Proton-K launch vehicle prevented the station from achieving orbit. It instead fell into the Pacific Ocean. The station, which would have been given the designation Salyut 2 had it reached orbit, was structurally identical to Salyut 1, as it had been assembled as a backup unit for that station.

==== Salyut 2 (OPS-1, military) ====
Salyut 2 (OPS-1) was launched in 1973. It was the first Almaz military space station to fly. Within two weeks of its launch, the station had lost altitude control and depressurized, leaving it unusable. Its orbit decayed and it re-entered the atmosphere on 28 May 1973, without any crews having visited it.

==== Kosmos 557 (DOS-3) ====
Kosmos 557 (Russian: Космос 557 meaning Cosmos 557), originally designated DOS-3, was originally intended to be launched as Salyut-3, but due to its failure to achieve orbit on May 11, 1973, three days before the launch of Skylab, it was renamed Kosmos-557.

Due to errors in the flight control system while out of the range of ground control, the station fired its attitude thruster until it consumed all of its attitude control fuel and became uncontrollable before raising its orbit to the desired altitude. Since the spacecraft was already in orbit and had been registered by Western radar, the Soviets disguised the launch as "Kosmos 557" and quietly allowed it to reenter Earth's atmosphere and burn up a week later. It was revealed to have been a Salyut station only much later.

==== Salyut 3 (OPS-2, military) ====
Salyut 3 (Russian: Салют-3, lit. 'Salute 3', also known as OPS-2 or Almaz 2) was launched on 25 June 1974. It was the second Almaz military space station, and the first such station to be launched successfully. It was included in the Salyut program to disguise its true military nature. Due to the military nature of the station, the Soviet Union was reluctant to release information about its design, and about the missions relating to the station.

It attained an altitude of 219 to 270 km on launch and NASA reported its final orbital altitude was 268 to 272 km. Only one of the three intended crews successfully boarded and operated the station, brought by Soyuz 14. Soyuz 15 attempted to bring a second crew but failed to dock, after which the third planned mission to the station was cancelled.

Although little official information has been released about the station, several sources report that it contained multiple Earth-observation cameras, as well as an on-board gun. The station was deorbited and re-entered the atmosphere on 24 January 1975. The next space station launched by the Soviet Union was the civilian station Salyut 4; the next military station was Salyut 5, which was the final Almaz space station.

Salyut 3 would make history by conducting the first test-fire of a conventional weapon in space. During Salyut 3's mission span, cosmonauts would fire the onboard 23mm cannon, which was reported to be a modified Nudelman aircraft cannon. To operate the cannon, the crew had to maneuver the whole space station in the direction of the target. Sources state that the firing was to deplete the ammunition on the craft. However, others sources say that the station conducted 3 tests of the gun through the whole mission span of Salyut 3.

==== Salyut 4 (DOS-4) ====
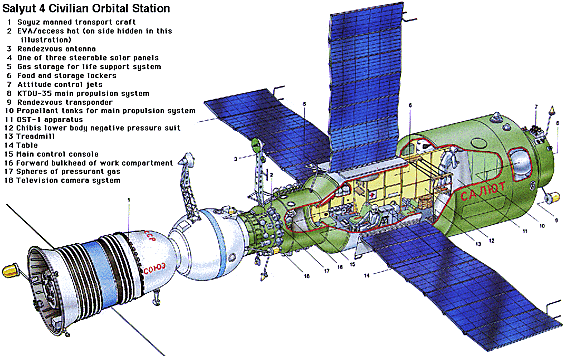
Salyut 4 diagram

Salyut 4 (DOS 4) was launched on December 26, 1974, into an orbit with an apogee of 355 km (221 mi), a perigee of 343 km (213 mi) and an orbital inclination of 51.6 degrees. It was essentially a copy of the DOS 3 (or Kosmos 557), and, unlike its ill-fated sibling, it was a complete success. Three crews attempted to make stays aboard Salyut 4 (Soyuz 17 and Soyuz 18 docked; Soyuz 18a suffered a launch abort). The second stay was for 63 days duration, and an uncrewed capsule, called Soyuz 20, remained docked to the station for three months, proving the system's long-term durability despite some deterioration of the environmental system during Soyuz 18's mission. Salyut 4 was deorbited February 2, 1977, and re-entered the Earth's atmosphere on February 3.

==== Salyut 5 (OPS-3, military) ====
Salyut 5, also known as OPS-3, was launched in 1976. It was the third and last Almaz space station to be launched for the Soviet military. Two Soyuz missions visited the station, each crewed by two cosmonauts. A third Soyuz mission attempted to visit the station but failed to dock. A fourth mission was planned but never launched.

=== Second generation – long-duration inhabitation of space ===
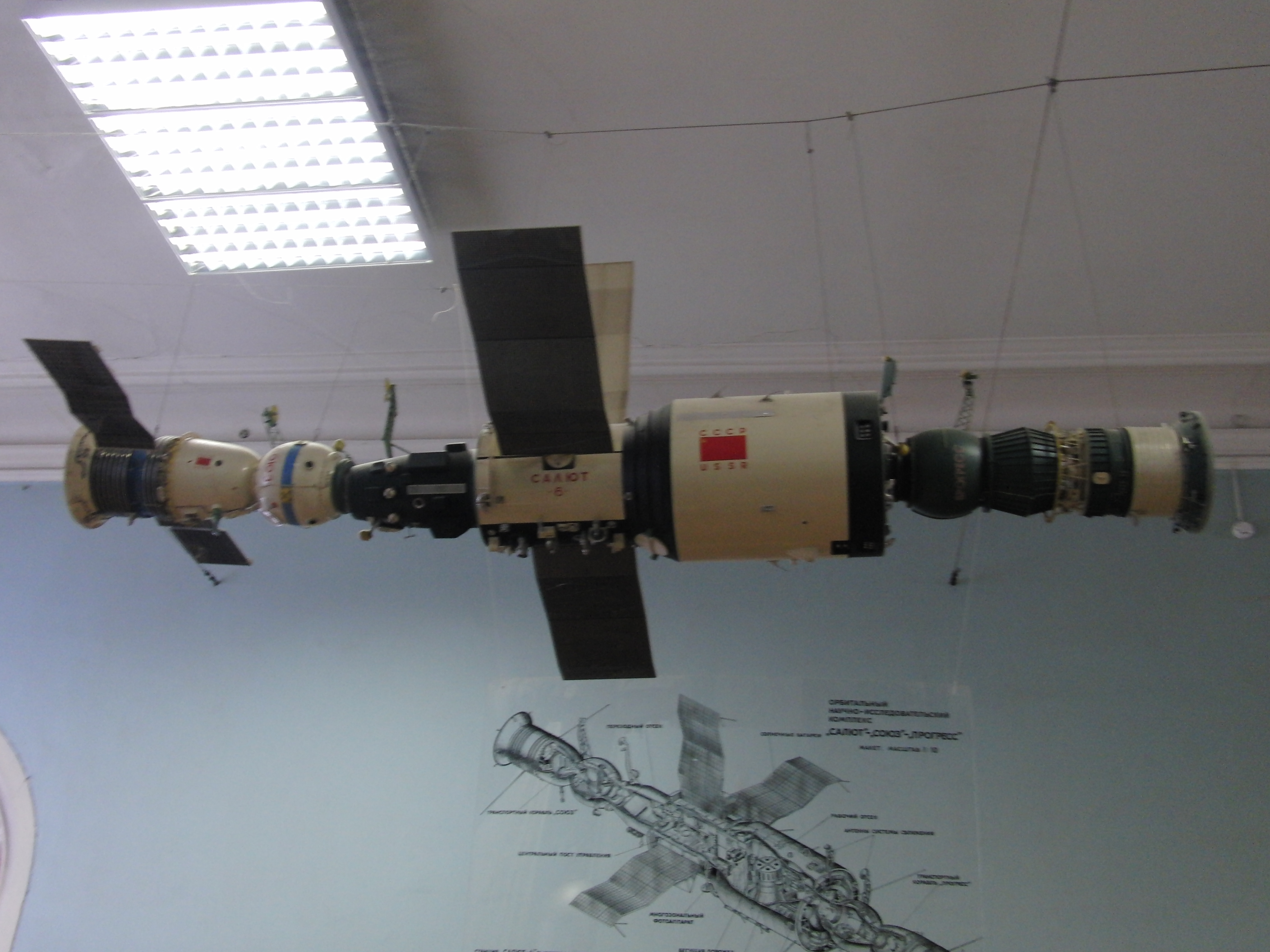
Mockup of Soyuz and Progress spacecraft docked to Salyut 6, Moscow Polytechnical Museum

In 1977, another marked step forward was made with the second generation of Salyut stations. The aim was to continuously occupy a space station with long-duration expeditions, for the first time in spaceflight.

Although Salyut 6 and Salyut 7 resembled the previous Salyut stations in overall design, several revolutionary changes were made to the stations and programme for the aim of continuous occupation. The new stations featured a longer design life and a second docking port at the aft of the stations – crew exchanges and station "handovers" were now made possible by docking two crewed Soyuz spacecraft at the same time. Furthermore, the uncrewed Progress resupply craft was created based on the crewed Soyuz, to resupply the crew and station with air, air regenerators, water, food, clothing, bedding, mail, propellants, pressurant, and other supplies. While the Progress docked to the station's second docking port, the crew's Soyuz spacecraft could remain docked to the station's first port. The Progress spacecraft even delivered hardware for updating onboard experiments and permitting repairs to the station, extending its life.

==== Salyut 6 (DOS-5) ====
DOS-5 (Salyut 6) space station with two docked spacecraft

Salyut 6, alternatively known DOS-5 as it was the fifth of the Durable Orbital Station series of civilian space stations, was launched on 29 September 1977 by a Proton-K rocket. Salyut 6 was the first space station to receive large numbers of crewed and uncrewed spacecraft for human habitation, crew transfer, international participation and resupply, establishing precedents for station life and operations which were enhanced on Mir and the International Space Station.

Salyut 6 was the first "second generation" space station, representing a major breakthrough in capabilities and operational success. In addition to a new propulsion system and its primary scientific instrument—the BST-1M multispectral telescope—the station had two docking ports, allowing two craft to visit simultaneously. This feature made it possible for humans to remain aboard for several months. Six long-term resident crews were supported by ten short-term visiting crews who typically arrived in newer Soyuz craft and departed in older craft, leaving the newer craft available to the resident crew as a return vehicle, thereby extending the resident crew's stay past the design life of the Soyuz. Short-term visiting crews routinely included international cosmonauts from Warsaw Pact countries participating in the Soviet Union's Intercosmos programme. These cosmonauts were the first spacefarers from countries other than the Soviet Union or the United States. Salyut 6 was visited and resupplied by twelve uncrewed Progress spacecraft including Progress 1, the first instance of the series. Additionally, Salyut 6 was visited by the first instances of the new Soyuz-T spacecraft.

The success of Salyut 6 contrasted with the programme's earlier failures and limited successes. The early history of the programme was plagued by the fatalities of Soyuz 11 and three launched stations which quickly failed. Earlier successful stations received few crews, limited to several weeks' habitation by the design life of their Soyuz craft and the presence of a single docking port per station; unsuccessful docking was also common. Salyut 6 on the other hand routinely received successful dockings of crewed and uncrewed craft, although the first visiting craft Soyuz 25 and later Soyuz 33 failed to dock with the station.

From 1977 to 1981, the station was occupied by human crews during six separate, discontinuous intervals, each coterminous with the presence of a resident crew who were first-in, last-out while support crew visited. Between each of these intervals Salyut 6 was vacant, although it was visited by Soyuz T-1 and Kosmos 1267 during its periods of vacancy. Following the launch of successor Salyut 7, Salyut 6 was de-orbited on 29 July 1982, almost five years after its own launch.

==== Salyut 7 (DOS-6) ====
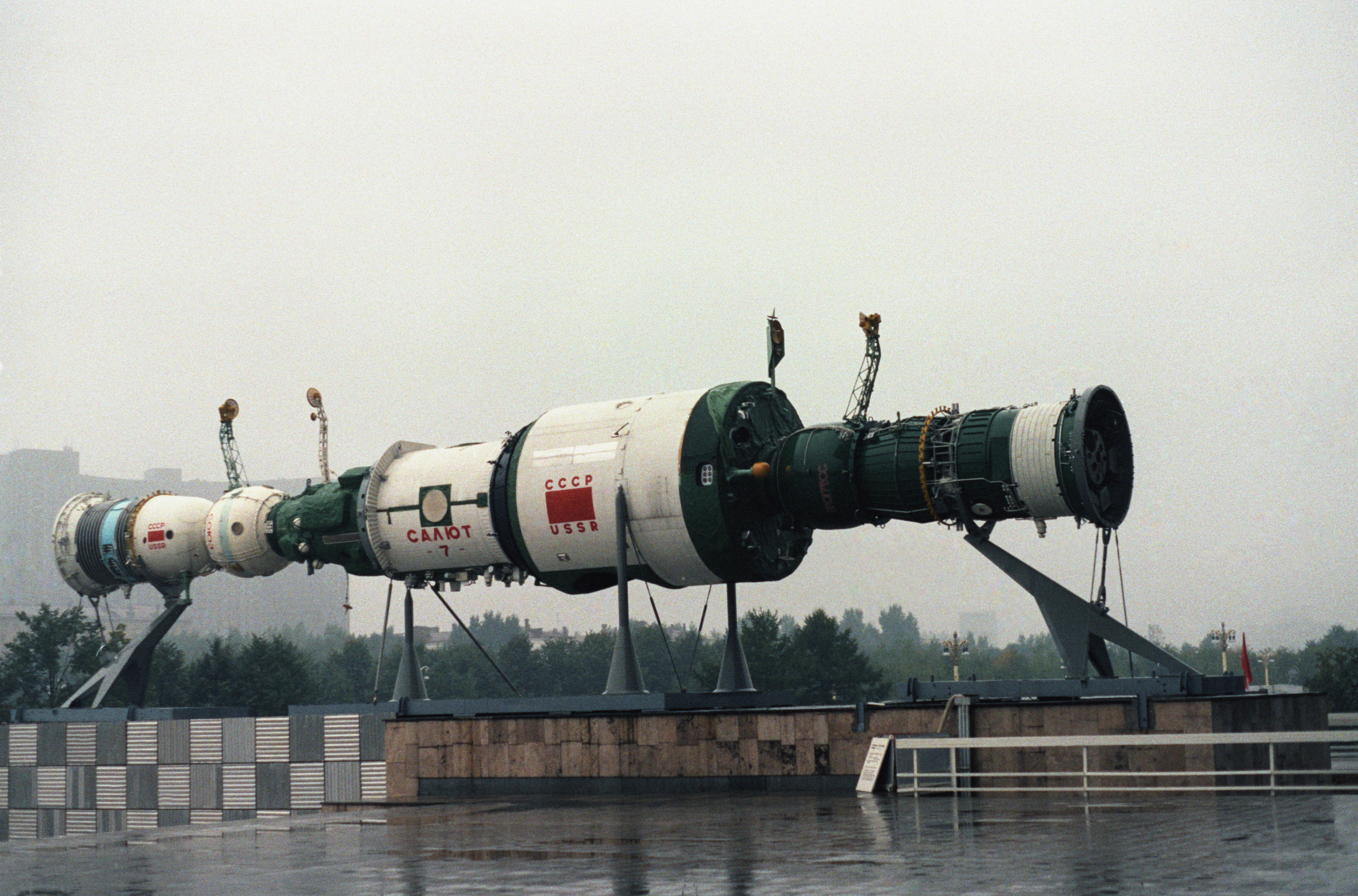
A full-scale model of a Salyut 7 space station and two docked spacecraft. On the left a Soyuz can be seen docked to the fore port, and on the right a Progress is docked at the aft port. The display is in front of one of the pavilions of the Exhibition of Soviet National Economic Achievement.

Salyut 7, also known as DOS-6, was a space station in low Earth orbit from April 1982 to February 1991. It was first crewed in May 1982 with two crew via Soyuz T-5, and last visited in June 1986, by Soyuz T-15. Various crew and modules were used over its lifetime, including 12 crewed and 15 uncrewed launches in total. Supporting spacecraft included the Soyuz T, Progress, and TKS spacecraft.

It was part of the Soviet Salyut programme, and launched on 19 April 1982 on a Proton-K rocket from Site 200/40 at the Baikonur Cosmodrome in the Soviet Union. Salyut 7 was part of the transition from monolithic to modular space stations, acting as a testbed for docking of additional modules and expanded station operations. It was the eighth space station of any kind launched. Salyut 7 was the last of both the second generation of DOS-series space stations and of the monolithic Salyut Program overall, to be replaced by Mir, the modular, expandable, third generation.

=== Salyut's heritage – modular space stations ===
After the second generation, plans for the next generation of Salyut stations called for the cores DOS-7 and DOS-8 to allow, for the first time in spaceflight, the addition of several modules to a station core and to create a modular space station. For this, the DOS modules were to be equipped with a total of four docking ports: one docking port at the aft of the station as in the second generation Salyuts, and the replacement of the front docking port with a "docking sphere" containing three docking ports — front, port, and starboard.

While the station cores DOS-7 and DOS-8 were built and flown, they never received the Salyut designation. Instead, DOS-7 evolved into the Mir Core Module for the Mir space station that followed the Salyut programme, and DOS-8 was used as the Zvezda Service Module for the International Space Station (ISS) which followed Mir.

The heritage from the Almaz programme is present even today. While the last space station from the Almaz programme was flown as Salyut 5 in 1976, the development of the Almaz TKS spacecraft evolved into the Functional Cargo Block, which formed the basis for several Mir modules, the experimental Polyus orbital weapons platform and the Zarya module of the ISS.

==== Mir Core Module (DOS-7) ====
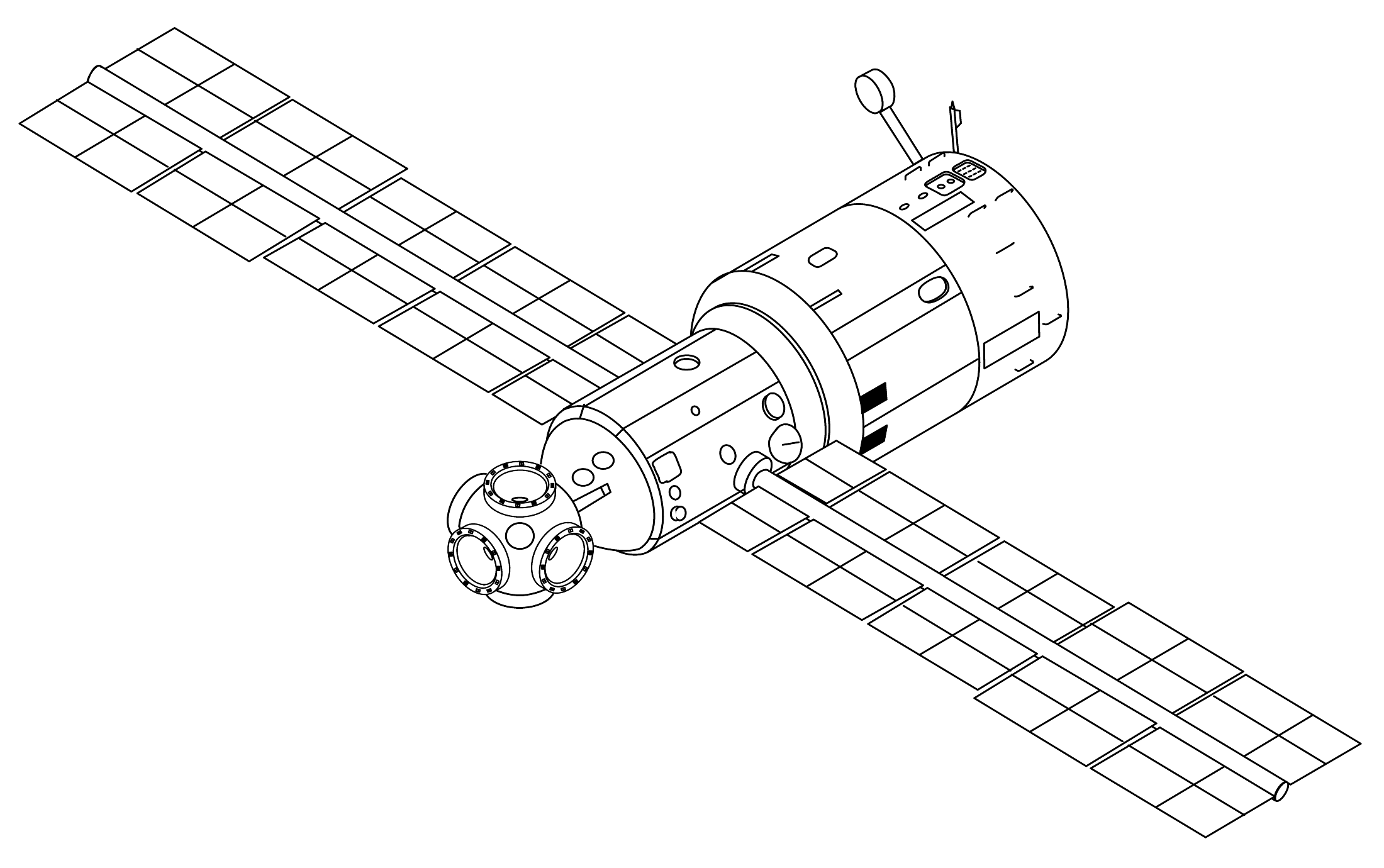
DOS-7 (Mir Core Module)

DOS-7 continued to be developed during Salyut 7, becoming the Mir Core Module of the Mir space station – the first modular space station, with crewed operations lasting from 1986 to 2000. The station featured upgraded computers and solar arrays, and accommodations for two cosmonauts each having their own cabin. A total of six docking ports were available on the Mir Core Module, which were used for space station modules and visiting spacecraft – the docking sphere design had been upgraded from its initial Salyut design to contain a maximum of five docking ports (front, port, starboard, zenith and nadir). And finally, the modules for Mir were derived from the Functional Cargo Block design of the Almaz programme.

The name of the Mir space station – Russian: Мир, literally Peace or World – was to signify the intentions of the Soviet Union to bring peace to the world. However, it was during the time of Mir that the Soviet Union was dissolved in December 1991, ending what was begun with the 1917 October Revolution in Russia. This dissolution had started with the Soviet "perestroika and glasnost" ("restructuring and openness") reform campaigns by Soviet leader Mikhail Gorbachev in the 1980s, had reached a preliminary endpoint with the revolutions of 1989 and the end of the communist Eastern Bloc (Warsaw Pact and the Comecon), finally to reach the Soviet Union itself in 1991.

While the Russian Federation became the successor to much of the dissolved Soviet Union and was in a position to continue the Soviet space program with the Russian Federal Space Agency, it faced severe difficulties: imports and exports had steeply declined as the economic exchange with Comecon nations had crumbled away, leaving the industry of the former Soviet Union in shambles. Not only did the political change in eastern Europe signify an end of contributions to the space programme by eastern European nations (such as the East German Carl Zeiss Jena), but parts of the Soviet space industry were located in the newly independent Ukraine, which was similarly cash-strapped as Russia and started to demand hard currency for its contributions.

It was during this time of transition and upheaval that the Shuttle–Mir program was established between the Russian Federation and the United States in 1993. The former adversaries would now cooperate, with "Phase One" consisting of joint missions and flights of the United States Space Shuttle to the Mir space station. It was a partnership with stark contrasts – Russia needed an inflow of hard currency to keep their space programme aloft, while in the United States it was seen as a chance to learn from the over 20 years of experience of Soviet space station operations. It was "Phase Two" of this Shuttle–Mir program that would lead to the International Space Station.

==== Zvezda ISS Service Module (DOS-8) ====
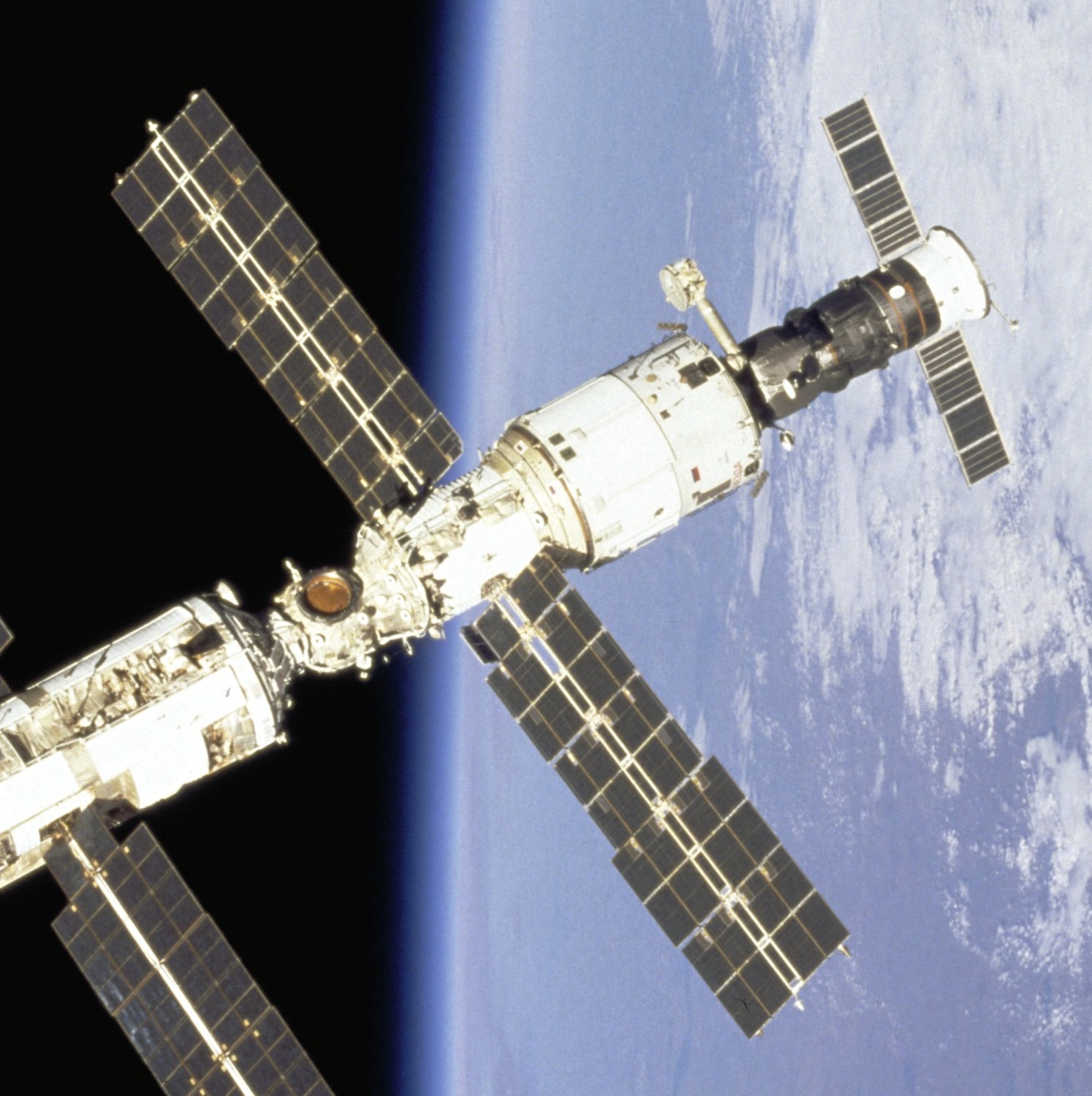
DOS-8 (Zvezda ISS module)

DOS-8 evolved into the Mir-2 project, intended to replace Mir. Finally, it became the International Space Station (ISS) Zvezda Service Module and formed the core of the early ISS together with the Zarya module (which was derived from Almaz Functional Cargo Block designs).

== Data table ==
The first generation of Salyut stations received few craft for rendezvous and docking. By contrast the programme's second generation stations, Salyut 6 and Salyut 7, received multiple crewed and uncrewed craft for rendezvous, docking attempts (whether successful or not), human habitation, crew transfer, and supply. The table counts craft which achieved rendezvous with their targets as visiting craft, regardless of whether they docked successfully.

Space station	Core module	Launched	Reentered	Days in orbit	Days occupied	All crew and visitors (total)	Visiting crewed spacecraft	Visiting uncrewed spacecraft	Mass kg
Salyut 1	DOS-1	19 April 1971; 01:40:00 UTC	11 October 1971	175	23	3	2	-	18,500
-	DOS-2	29 July 1972	29 July 1972	-	-	-	-	-	18,500
Salyut 2	OPS-1 (military)	4 April 1973; 09:00:00 UTC	28 May 1973	54	-	-	-	-	18,500
- (Kosmos 557)	DOS-3	11 May 1973; 00:20:00 UTC	22 May 1973	11	-	-	-	-	19,400
Salyut 3	OPS-2 (military)	25 June 1974; 22:38:00 UTC	24 January 1975	213	15	2	2	-	18,500
Salyut 4	DOS-4	26 December 1974; 04:15:00 UTC	3 February 1977	770	92	4	2	1	18,500
Salyut 5	OPS-3 (military)	22 June 1976; 18:04:00 UTC	8 August 1977	412	67	4	3	-	19,000
Salyut 6	DOS-5	29 September 1977; 06:50:00 UTC	29 July 1982	1764	683	33	18	15	19,824
Salyut 7	DOS-6	19 April 1982; 19:45:00 UTC	7 February 1991	3216	816	26	11	15	18,900
For comparison, the DOS-7 and DOS-8 modules that were derived from the Salyut programme:
Mir	DOS-7; Mir Core Module	19 February 1986	23 March 2001	5511	4,592	104	39	64	20,400
ISS	DOS-8; Zvezda; ISS Service Module	12 July 2000	Still in orbit	8,723	7,500	215	85 (ROS and USOS)	65 (ROS and USOS)	19,051

== See also ==
- List of human spaceflights to Salyut space stations
- List of Salyut expeditions
- List of Salyut visitors
- List of Salyut spacewalks
- List of uncrewed spaceflights to Salyut space stations
