= Pavel Popovich =

Soviet pilot and cosmonaut (1930–2009)

- Павел Попович; Павло Попович
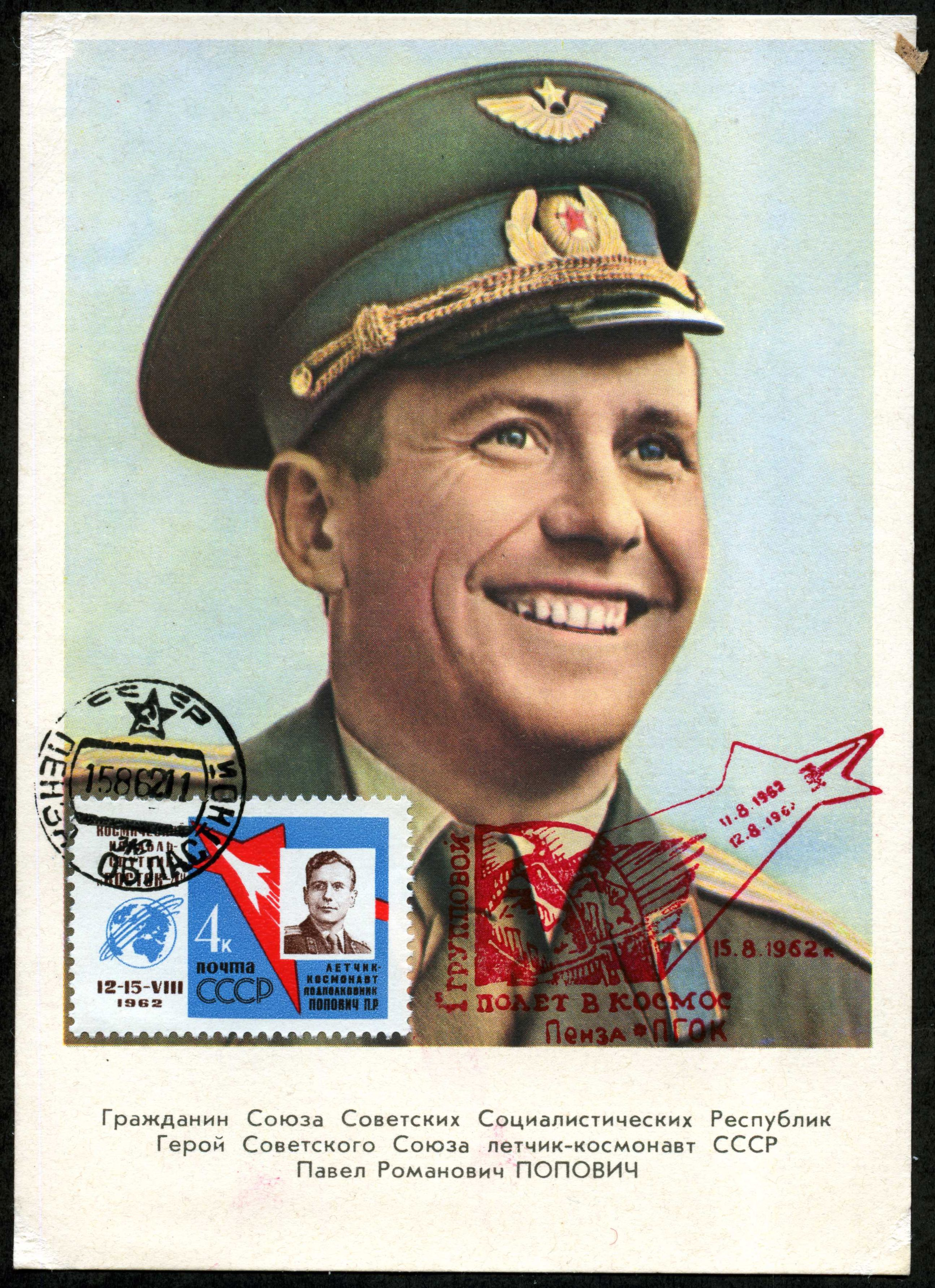
- Popovich on a Soviet stamp
- Born: Pavel Romanovich Popovich; 5 October 1930; Uzyn, Kyiv Oblast, Ukrainian SSR, Soviet Union
- Died: 29 September 2009 (aged 78); Gurzuf, Crimea, Ukraine
- Occupation: Pilot
- Spouse(s): Marina Vasilyeva (divorced) Alevtina Oshegova
- Space career

Cosmonaut
- Rank: Major General, Soviet Air Force
- Time in space: 2d 22h 57m (Vostok 4); 15d 17h 30m (Soyuz 14) 18d 16h 27m (total)
- Selection: Air Force Group 1
- Missions: Vostok 4, Soyuz 14
- Retired: 26 January 1982

Pavel Romanovich Popovich (Russian: Па́вел Рома́нович Попо́вич; Ukrainian: Павло́ Рома́нович Попо́вич, romanized: Pavló Románovych Popóvych; 5 October 1930 – 29 September 2009) was a Soviet cosmonaut.

Popovich was the fourth cosmonaut in space, the sixth person in orbit, the eighth person and first Ukrainian in space.

== Biography ==
Popovich was born in Uzyn, Kyiv Oblast, Ukrainian SSR to Roman Porfirievich Popovich (a fireman in a sugar factory) and Theodosia Kasyanovna Semyonova. He had two sisters (one older, one younger) and two brothers (both younger).

During World War II, the Germans occupied Uzyn and burned documents, including Popovich's birth certificate. After the war, these were restored through witness testimony, and although his mother said that Popovich was born in 1929, two witnesses insisted it was in 1930, which thus became the official year of his birth.

In 1947, Popovich left vocational school in Bila Tserkva with qualifications as a carpenter. In 1951, Popovich graduated as a construction engineer from a technical school in Magnitogorsk, as well as receiving a pilot's degree.

In 1954, Popovich joined the Young Communist League.

He married Marina Popovich, a retired Soviet Air Force colonel and test pilot. They had two daughters but later divorced, and Popovich married Alevtina Oshegova.

Popovich was a keen weightlifter:

"Service in the Air Force made us strong, both physically and morally. All of us cosmonauts took up sports and PT seriously when we served in the Air Force. I know that Yuri Gagarin was fond of ice hockey. He liked to play goal keeper. Gherman Titov was a gymnastics enthusiast, Andriyan Nikolayev liked skiing, Pavel Popovich went in for weight lifting. I don't think I am wrong when I say that sports became a fixture in the life of the cosmonauts."

Following his military and space service (see below), he was a member of the Supreme Soviet of the Ukrainian Soviet Socialist Republic 6th–11th convocations.

After his retirement in 1993, Popovich lived in Moscow. Popovich died in a hospital in Gurzuf where he was taken following a stroke on 29 September 2009, six days before his 79th birthday. Brain hemorrhage was cited as the cause of death. He was buried in Moscow.

== Military ==
In 1952, Popovich graduated from a course at the Stalingrad Military Aviation School near Novosibirsk. He then went on to train at the Military Officers of the Air Force Aviation Training School in Grozny, until 1954, when he joined the Soviet Air Force.

=== Service ===
Details are from Space Encyclopedia ASTROnote, unless otherwise noted

Date	Role	Location
25 Dec 1954	Pilot	265 Fighter Regiment (IAP)
25 Dec 1954	Pilot	336th Fighter Aviation Division (IAD) (later the IAD 64-Fighter Air Corps (IAC) 22nd Air Army)
19 Jun 1957	Senior Pilot/Squadron Adjutant	336th Fighter Aviation Division (IAD) (later the IAD 64-Fighter Air Corps (IAC) 22nd Air Army)
27 Feb 1958	Senior Airman	772-IAP IAS 22nd 26th VA.
31 May 1958	Senior Airman	234-Guards Regiment Proskurov 9th IN IAD Moscow (Kubinka)
31 Jan 1959	Adjutant of the squadron	234-Guards Regiment Proskurov 9th IN IAD Moscow (Kubinka)
Jan 1982	Deputy Chief	Yuri Gagarin Cosmonauts Training Center
29 Dec 1989	Secondment	State Committee of the USSR Agro
20 Aug 1993	Retired by order of the Defense Ministry	

Aircraft types flown:

- Yakovlev Yak-11
- Yakovlev Yak-18
- Lavochkin La-9
- Mikoyan-Gurevich MiG-15

=== Training ===
Details are from Space Encyclopedia ASTROnote, unless otherwise noted

Date	Cyrillic	English
12 May 1959	Военный летчик 3-го класса	Military Pilot, 3rd class
15 Aug 1962	Военный летчик 1-го класса	Military Pilot, 1st class
10 Nov 1960	Инструктор парашютно-десантной подготовки (ПДП) ВВС	Parachute Instructor (PDP) Air Force
30 Nov 1962	Космонавт 3-го класса	Astronaut 3rd class
24 Jul 1974	Космонавт 2-го класса	Astronaut 2nd class

=== Promotions ===
Details are from Space Encyclopedia ASTROnote, unless otherwise noted

Date	Insignia	Cyrillic	English
30 Oct 1954		Лейтенант	Lieutenant
24 Apr 1957		Старший лейтенант	Senior Lieutenant
30 Mar 1959		Капитан	Captain
05 Nov 1961		Майор	Major
11 Aug 1962		Подполковник (Podpolkovnik)	Lieutenant Colonel
30 Apr 1965		Полковник (Polkovnik)	Colonel
5 May 1976		Генерал-майор авиации	Major-General (Aviation)
20 Aug 1993		Retired from the Air Force	

== Cosmonaut ==
In 1960, he was selected as one of the first group of twenty air force pilots that would train as the first cosmonauts for the Soviet space program. The training took place between March 1960 and January 1961, and Popovich passed his final exams in Cosmonaut Basic Training on 17/18 January 1961. He was appointed as an astronaut on 25 January 1961.

He was considered a strong candidate for the first spaceflight – but while Yuri Gagarin was ultimately chosen for the Vostok 1 flight, Popovich served as the flight's capcom.

From May to August 1961, he trained to fly on spacecraft "Vostok-2" in a group of astronauts, followed (between September and November 1961) with training to fly "Vostok-3". This flight was cancelled. Between November 1961 and May 1962, he trained as a pilot for "Vostok-4". Between June and August of that year, he received further training in the maintenance of this spacecraft.

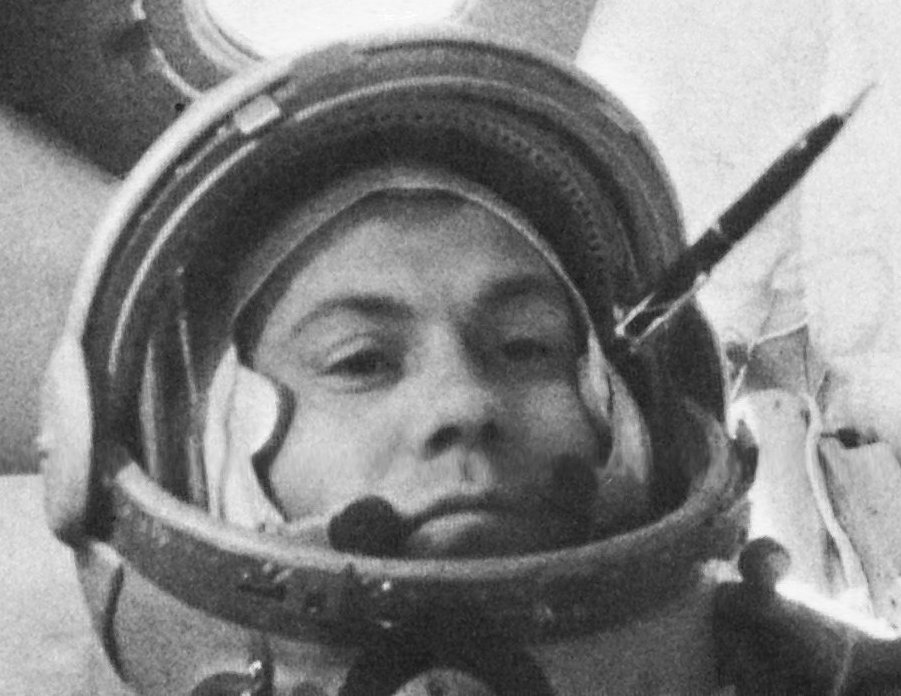
Popovich in Vostok 4

He commanded the space flight Vostok 4 (Russian: Восток-4) in 1962 which, along with Andrian Nikolayev on Vostok 3, was the first time that more than one crewed spacecraft were in orbit at the same time. His call sign for this flight was Golden eagle (Бе́ркут).

In January 1964, he became a cosmonaut instructor, becoming deputy commander to the 2nd group of cosmonauts.

Popovich was selected to command one of the Soviet Union's planned Moon landings, and trained for this between 1966 and 1968, when the Soviet Moon landing plans were scrapped.

In 1968, he was selected as commander for Soyuz 2, but after the death of Vladimir Komarov during the reentry of Soyuz 1, Soyuz 2 was launched without a crew.

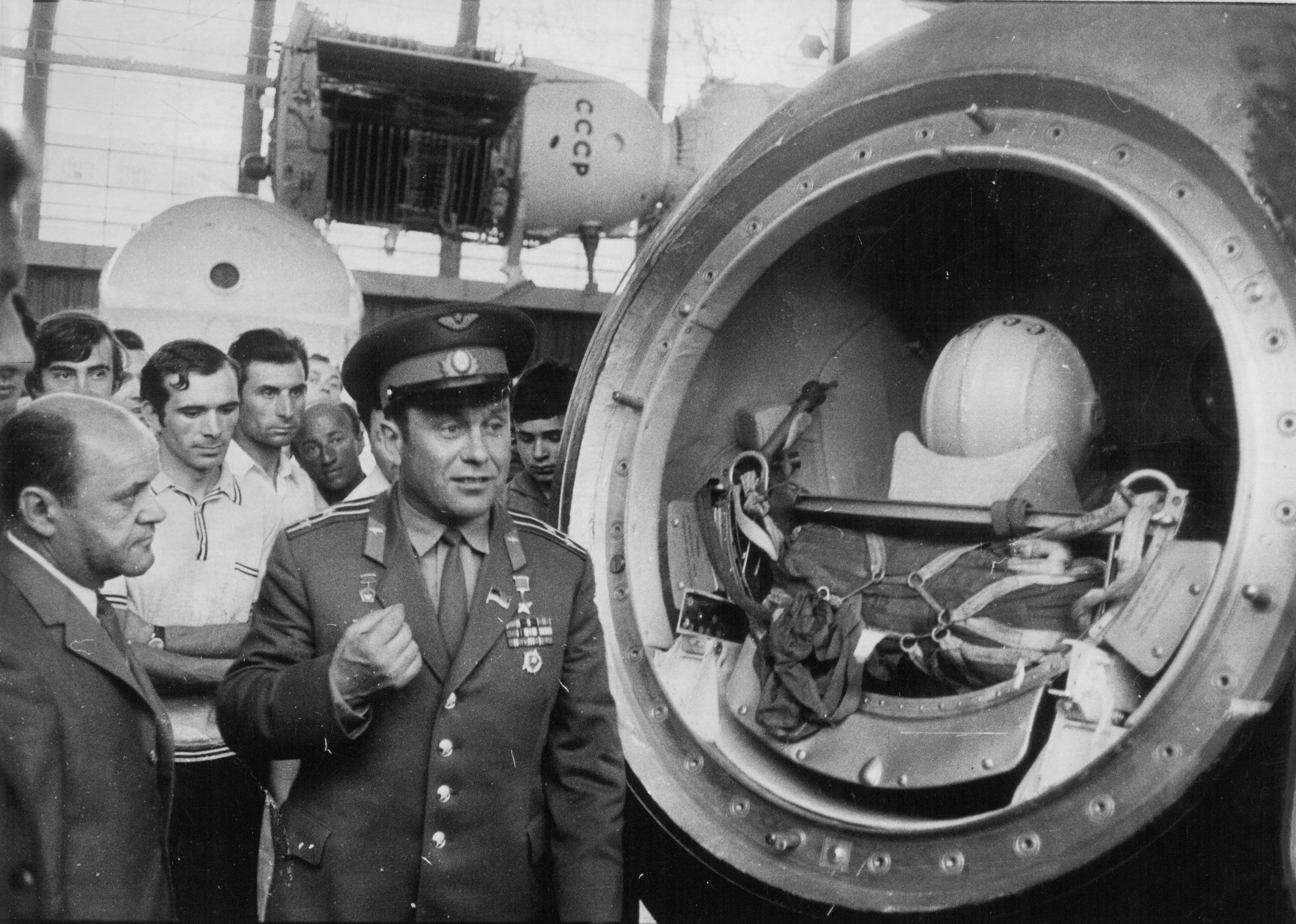
Popovich with Milivoj Jugin in Belgrade

In 1969 he was a senior cosmonaut instructor, and became (by 1972) the Chief of cosmonaut training.

In 1974, he commanded his second (and final) space flight Soyuz 14 (Russian: Союз 14) in 1974. Again, his call sign for this flight was Golden eagle (Бе́ркут). This flight was the first to the Salyut 3 space station.

In 1977, he received a post-graduate degree in technical sciences.

In March 1978, he was on duty in the Flight Control Center for Vladimír Remek's flight aboard Soyuz 28.

From 1978 he was the deputy chief of the Gagarin Cosmonauts Training Center responsible for research and testing work. From 1980 to 1989, he was Deputy chief of the Cosmonaut Training Center. In January 1982, he was removed from the list of active cosmonauts, so that he could serve as Deputy Chief for Scientific Testing and Research at the Center.

== Sociopolitical life ==
Details are from Space Encyclopedia ASTROnote, unless otherwise noted

- From 1992: Chairman of the Boxing Federation of Russia.
- From 1994: President of the Yuri Gagarin Foundation; President of the Social Support for Veterans of the Armed Forces of the Union
- From 1996: Member of the Editorial Board of Space News
- From 1998: Member of the Editorial Board of the All-Russia scientific and technical magazine Flight
- From 1999: President of the Ukrainian Union of Cosmonauts
- Member of the Writers' Union of Russia.
- President of the Association of Space Museums of Russia (AMKOS)
- Honorary President of the International Association of Veterans of Physical Education and Sport (MAFIS)
- Honorary Chairman of the Society of Ukrainian Culture (Slavutich)

== Awards and honors ==
Details are from Space Encyclopedia ASTROnote, unless otherwise noted

Date of Award	Award	Notes
17 Jun 1961	Order of the Red Star	
1962	Pilot-Cosmonaut of the USSR	
1962	Honorable Radio Operator	
1962	Honored Master of Sports of the USSR^{a}	
1962	Medal "For the Development of Virgin Lands"	
19 Aug 1962	Hero of the Soviet Union^{b}	
19 Aug 1962	Order of Lenin	
15 Nov 1962	Gold Star Labor Hero of the Democratic Republic of Vietnam	
20 July 1974	Hero of the Soviet Union	
20 Jul 1974	Order of Lenin	
1982	Order of Friendship of Peoples	
13 May 1985	Medal "For Strengthening Military Cooperation"	
9 Apr 1996	Order of Honour^{c}	for services to the state, many years of fruitful activity in the arts and culture.
6 Oct 2000	Order of Merit for the Fatherland, 4th Grade^{d}	for services to the state and many years of fruitful work.
1 Dec 2005	Ukrainian Order of Prince Yaroslav the Wise, 4th class^{e}	for his significant personal contribution to the development and strengthening of Ukrainian-Russian relations, promoting the rise of prestige of the Ukrainian state in the world.
Unknown	Order of the Badge of Honor	
Unknown	Medal of the Republic of Cuba	
Unknown	9 Commemorative Medals	

Notes:

^{a} For setting records in space flight
^{b} Medal number 11117
^{c} For services to the state, many years of fruitful work in the field of culture and art (as President of the Association of Space Museums) (Presidential Decree No. 512 of April 9, 1996)
^{d} For services to the state and long-term fruitful work (Presidential Decree No. 1724 on October 6, 2000)
^{e} For significant personal contribution to the development and strengthening of Ukrainian-Russian relations, promoting the rise of the authority of the Ukrainian state in the world (Presidential Decree No. 1682/2005 dated December 1, 2005)

=== Other honours ===
He received honorary citizenship of several cities:

- In Russia: Kaluga^{a}, Kovrov, Magnitogorsk (1965), Yuzhno-Sakhalinsk
- In Ukraine: Poltava, Zaporizhzhia and Bila Tserkva
- In Bulgaria: Targovishte
- In Kazakhstan: Guriev

Notes:

^{a} Popovich is the only person to have received the honorary citizenship of Kaluga twice. The first time was in August 1962 (Decision 597 of the Executive Committee of Kaluga City Council of Workers' Deputies), and the second time was in April 1964 (Decision 237 of the Executive Committee of Kaluga City Council of Workers' Deputies).

A bronze sculpture to Popovich was established in Uzyn.

The name of Pavel Popovich was given to a mountain ridge in Antarctica and to the Mars-crossing asteroid 8444 Popovich.

In 1991, he became director of the Institute Rossiyskogo for Monitoring of Land and Ecosystems, then worked as chairman of the board of directors of the All-Russia Institute of Aero-Photo-Geodesic Studies (VISKhAGI), dealing with the compilation of a land inventory of Russia using images from space.

He had also been the chairman of Ukrainian diaspora organisation in Russia.

He was awarded a Gold Tsiolkovsky Medal by the Academy of Sciences of the USSR and a De La Vaux Medal from the Fédération Aéronautique Internationale.

In Ukraine there was a celebration of the 80th anniversary of the birth of the first Ukrainian astronaut, twice the Hero of the Soviet Union P.P. Popovich.

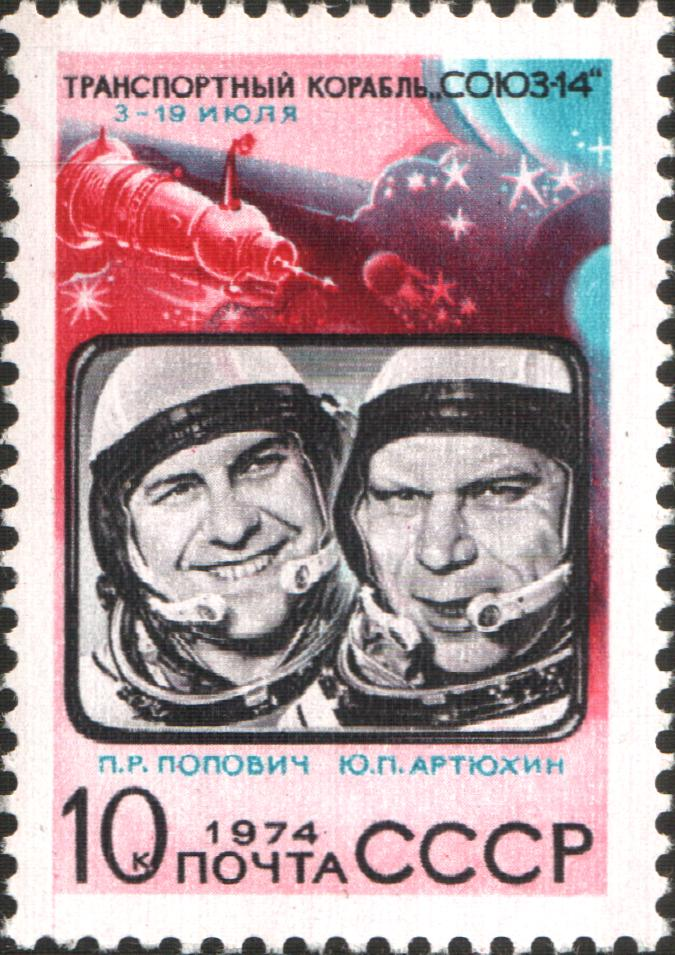
Postage stamp (Soviet Union): Pavel Popovich and Yury Artyukhin – Soyuz 14 Mission

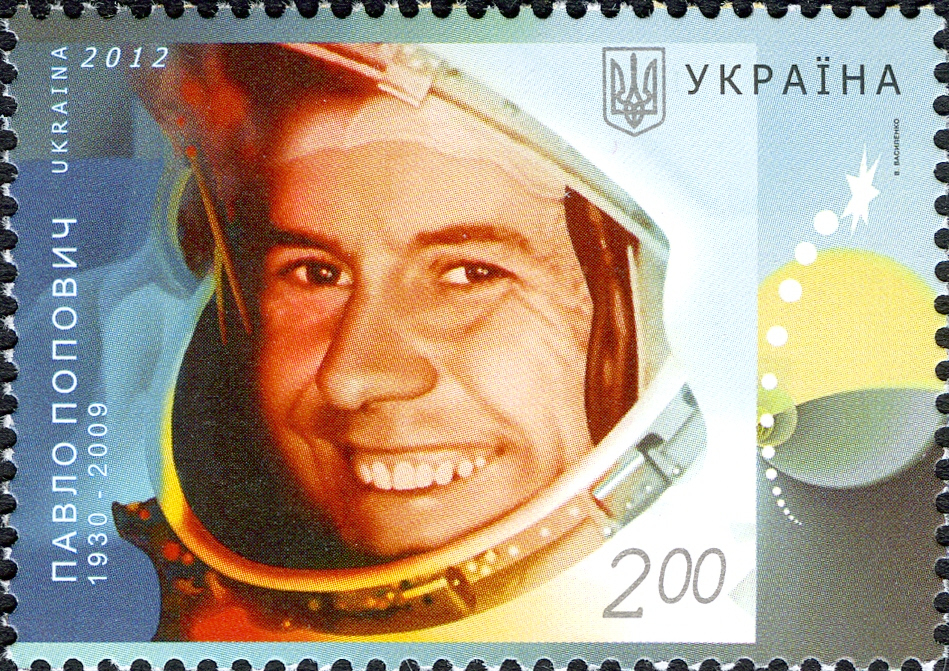
2012 stamp of Ukraine

== Ufology ==
In 1984 Popovich joined the Russian Academy of Sciences' newly created All-Union Investigation Committee for Anomalous Aerial Phenomena and became head of the Academy's UFO Commission.

In the 2002 SciFi Channel documentary Out of the Blue, Popovich relays a sighting of a UFO next to the airplane he was travelling aboard as he was returning home from Washington, D.C., with a delegation of scientists. The UFO was seen by everyone on board the plane. It was perfect triangle shaped and emitted a very bright, white light at a distance of about 1.5 kilometres (0.93 mi) and an altitude about 1,000 metres (3,300 ft) above the airplane. The object had an estimated speed of 1,500 kilometres per hour (930 mph) travelling parallel to the airplane and passed and overtook the plane in about 30 to 40 seconds.

Popovich was the president of the UFO association of Russia.

== Bibliography ==
Details are from Space Encyclopedia ASTROnote, unless otherwise noted

=== Books ===
- "I Flew in the Morning" (1974)
- "Space Humanity" (1981)
- "Tested in Space and on Earth" (1982)
- "The endless roads of the Universe" (1985)
- "Robinson of the Universe" (1986)

=== Works in Collections ===
- "Space – My Job"
- "High Orbit"
- "Star"
- "Conquest of Infinity"
- "... 3, 2, 1!"

=== Essays ===
- "Secrets of the Galaxy"
- "Mysteries of the Eternal Cosmos"
- "Forward – to the Sources of the Past"
