= Lev Dyomin =

Soviet cosmonaut (1926–1998)

- Лев Дёмин
- Dyomin in 1974
- Born: Lev Stepanovich Dyomin; 11 January 1926; Moscow, Russian SFSR, Soviet Union
- Died: 18 December 1998 (aged 72); Zvyozdny Gorodok, Russia
- Occupation: Pilot
- Awards: Hero of the Soviet Union
- Space career

Cosmonaut
- Rank: Colonel, Soviet Air Force
- Time in space: 2d 00h 12m
- Selection: Air Force Group 2
- Missions: Soyuz 15

Lev Stepanovich Dyomin (Russian: Лев Степанович Дёмин; 11 January 1926 – 18 December 1998) was a Soviet cosmonaut who flew on the Soyuz 15 spaceflight in 1974. This spaceflight was intended to dock with the space station Salyut 3, but the docking failed.

== Biography ==
Dyomin was born in Moscow. He gained a doctoral degree in engineering from the Soviet Air Force Engineering Academy and the rank of Colonel in the Soviet Air Force.

Aged 48 at the time of his flight on Soyuz 15, he was the oldest cosmonaut up to that point as well as the first grandfather to go into space. He remained in the program until leaving in 1982 to pursue deep-sea research. Dyomin died of cancer, in Zvyozdny Gorodok, in 1998.

He was awarded:

- Hero of the Soviet Union
- Pilot-Cosmonaut of the USSR
- Order of Lenin
- Order of the Red Banner of Labour
- Medal "For Battle Merit"
- Medal "For the Development of Virgin Lands"
- Order of the Banner of the People's Republic of Bulgaria
