= Milivoj Jugin =

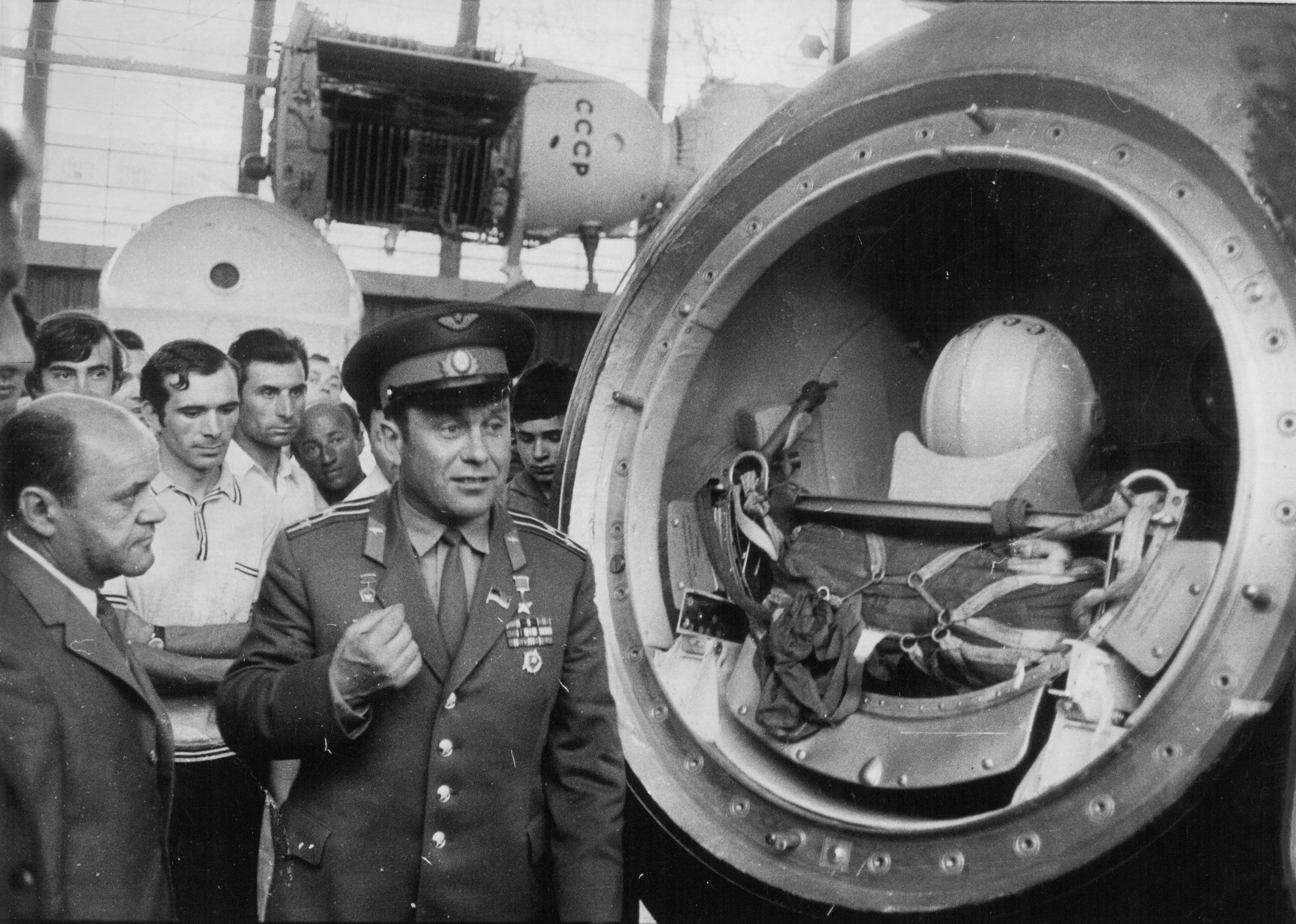
- Jugin (left) with Soviet cosmonaut Pavel Popovich on Belgrade Fair
- Born: 22 August 1925; Kikinda
- Died: 20 January 2013 (aged 87)

Milivoj Jugin (22 August 1925 - 20 January 2013) was a Yugoslav and Serbian aeronautical engineer, constructor, publicist and popularizer of science.

== History ==
Under influence of family friend Kosta Sivčev, an aircraft designer, Jugin graduated aerospace engineering on Faculty of Mechanical Engineering of Belgrade University, and then he continued his education in the Soviet Union. Jugin was part of the engineering team led by Sivčev and Zlatko Rendulić that designed the Yugoslav first mass-produced jet Soko G-2 Galeb.

He was an expert commentator on Belgrade Television, and participated in many astronautical congresses, including at the 1968 United Nations Conference on the Exploration and Peaceful Uses of Outer Space (UNISPACE I) held in Vienna. He visited the Cape Kennedy cosmodrome in the US twice and stayed in the Star City of the Soviet cosmonauts near Moscow. Jugin has collaborated in numerous newspapers and magazines and, as expert, reported live from Cape Kennedy launch of Apollo 11, and then returned to Belgrade to host broadcast of Armstrong's and Aldrin's landing on Moon.

== Bibliography ==
- Kosmos otkriva tajne (Cosmos Reveals Secrets). ISBN 86-335-0024-8
- Svi smo kosmonauti (We All Are Cosmonauts). ISBN 86-17-03370-3
- Večni trag (Eternal Trace) ISBN 86-335-0057-4
