= Medal "For the Development of Virgin Lands" =

- Type: Civilian medal
- Awarded for: Development of virgin and fallow lands in Kazakhstan, Siberia, the Ural, the Volga and the North Caucasus.
- Presented by: USSR
- Eligibility: Soviet citizens
- Status: No longer awarded
- Established: October 26, 1956

Highlights
- Total: 1,345,520
- Ribbon of the Medal "For the Development of Virgin Lands"

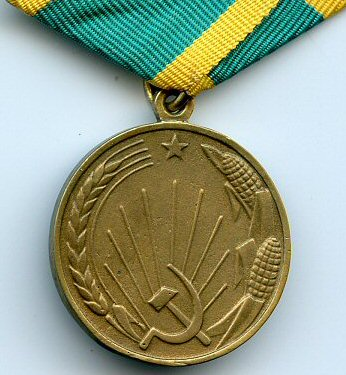
Reverse of the Medal "For the Development of Virgin Lands"

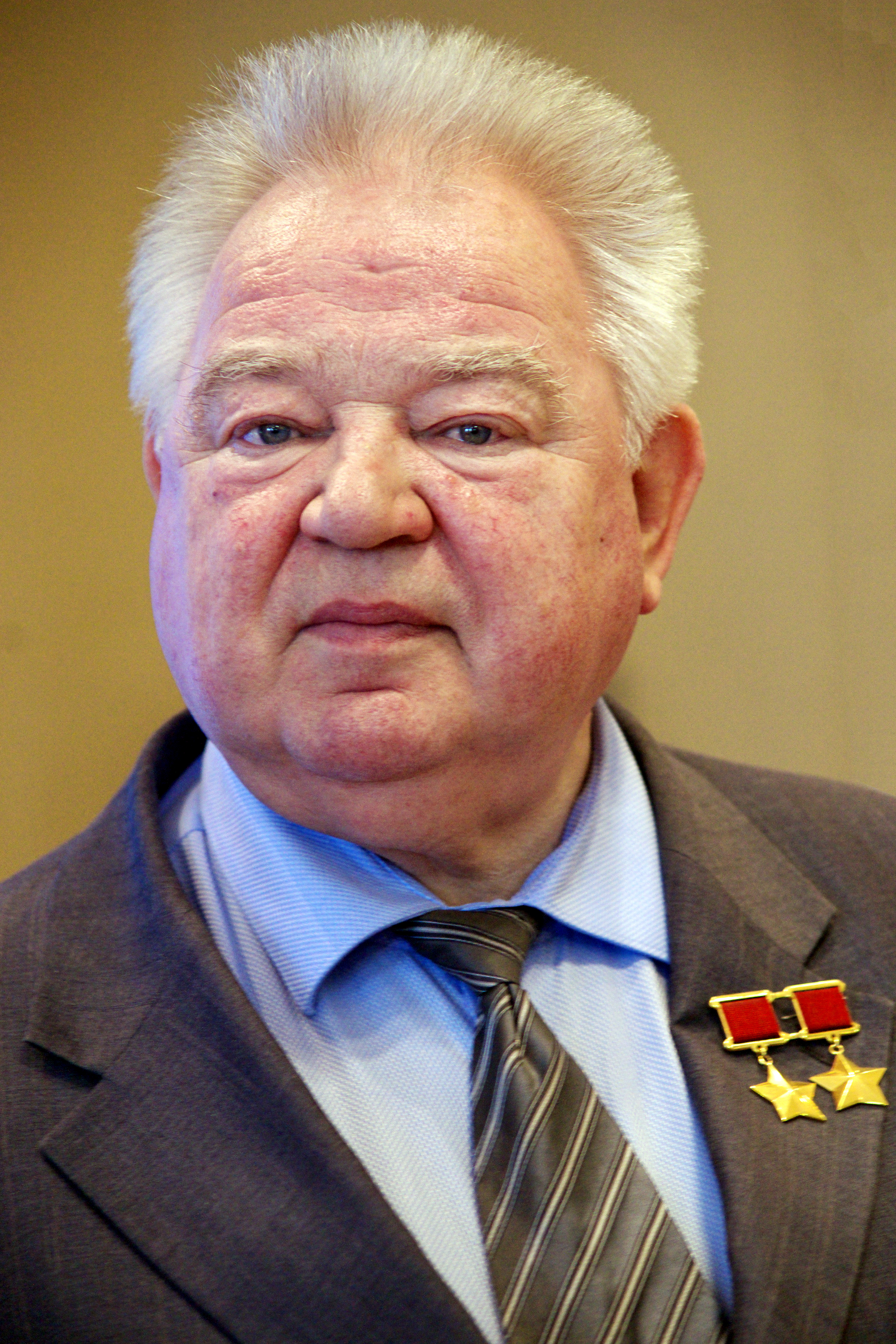
Georgy Grechko, a recipient of the Medal "For the Development of Virgin Lands"

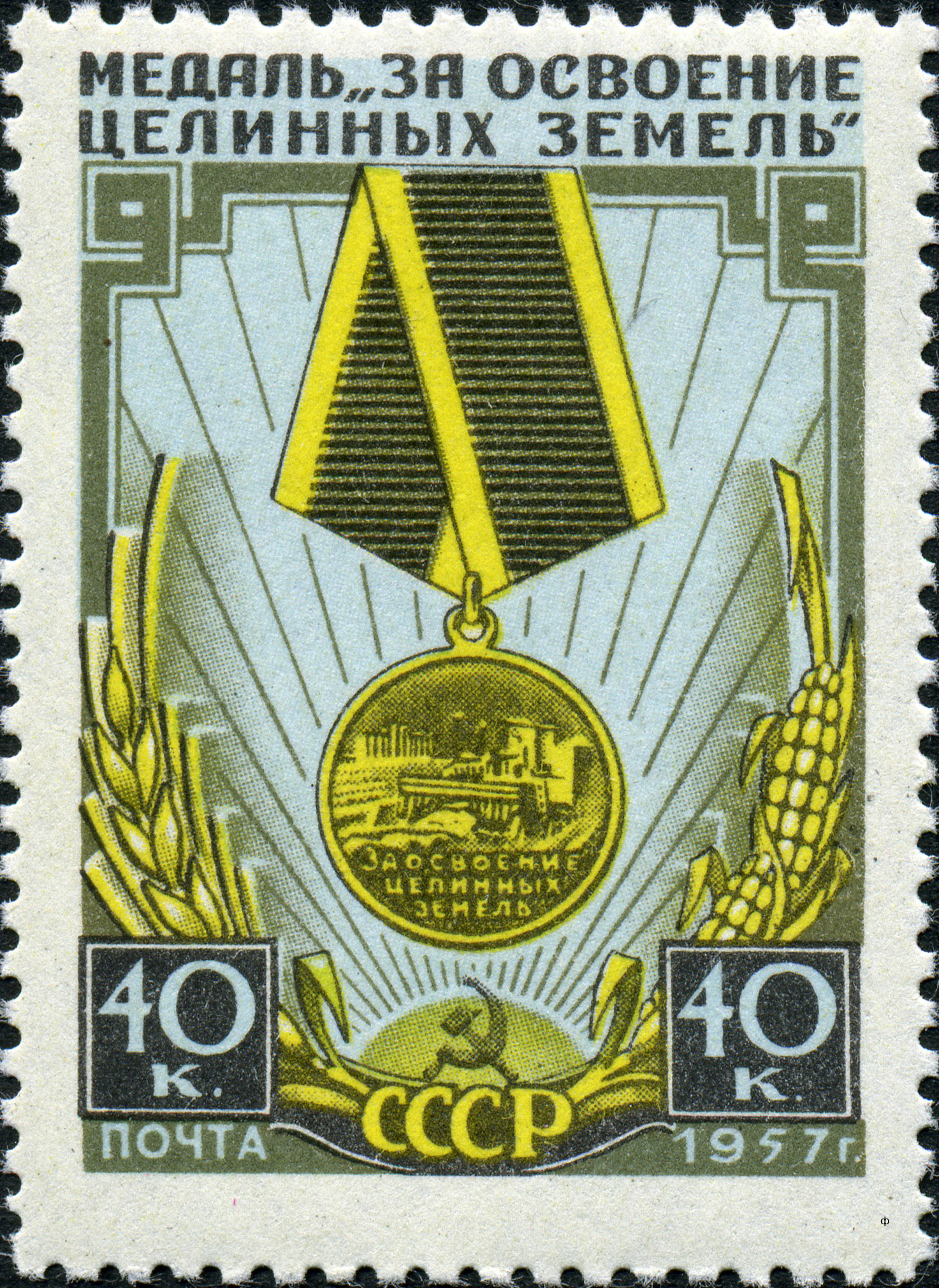
1957 Soviet postage stamp commemorating the Medal "For the Development of Virgin Lands"

The Medal "For the Development of Virgin Lands" (Russian: Медаль «За освоение целинных земель», romanized: Medal' "Za osvoyeniye tselinnykh zemel'") was a civilian award of the Soviet Union established on October 26, 1956 by Decree of the Presidium of the Supreme Soviet of the USSR to recognise individuals who displayed superior performance in labour over two years connected with the Virgin Lands Campaign started in 1954 by Nikita Khrushchev to cultivate 36,000,000 ha (89,000,000 acres; 360,000 km^{2}) of previously uncultivated lands in Kazakhstan, Siberia, the Urals, the Volga area and the northern Caucasus, it was intended to serve as an example for good achievements in the performance of civic duties.

== Medal statute ==
The Medal "For the Development of Virgin Lands" was awarded to farmers, workers of state farms, MTS, construction and other organisations, the Party, government, labour and Komsomol workers for their good work in the development of virgin and fallow lands in Kazakhstan, Siberia, the Ural, the Volga and the North Caucasus for a period of usually at least two years. This Medal was also awarded to Yuri Gagarin right after his space flight. It became a tradition to award the Medal to many Soviet cosmonauts after that.

Names of potential recipients of the Medal "For Development of Virgin Lands" were submitted in alphabetical lists by the chairmen of collective farms, heads of enterprises, institutions and organizations, as well as secretaries of Party organizations or of the chairmen of trade union organizations and sent to the executive committees of district Soviets who selected recipients and forwarded the lists to the Presidium of the Supreme Soviets of Autonomous Republics and the executive committees of territorial and regional councils of deputies workers for final approval.

The Medal "For the Development of Virgin Lands" was awarded on behalf of the Presidium of the Supreme Soviet of the USSR by chairmen, deputy chairmen and members of the Presidium of the Supreme Soviets of Autonomous Republics and the executive committees of regional, provincial, district and city Soviets in the communities of the award recipients.

The Medal "For the Development of Virgin Lands" was worn on the left side of the chest and the presence of other orders and medals of the USSR, immediately after the Medal "For Restoration of the Donbass Coal Mines". If worn in the presence of Orders or medals of the Russian Federation, the latter have precedence.

== Medal description ==
The Medal "For the Development of Virgin Lands" was a 32 mm in diameter circular medal, on its obverse, the image of a C-4 combine harvester in a field with a grain silo in the background on the horizon, at the bottom, the relief inscription on three rows "For the development of virgin lands" (Russian: «За освоение целинных земель»). On the reverse at the bottom, the relief image of the hammer and sickle with sun rays radiating upwards towards a five pointed star at the top, along the right circumference, ears of corn, along the left circumference, a panicle of wheat.

The Medal "For the Development of Virgin Lands" was secured by a ring through the medal suspension loop to a standard Soviet pentagonal mount covered by an overlapping 24 mm dark green silk moiré ribbon with 3 mm wide yellow edge stripes.

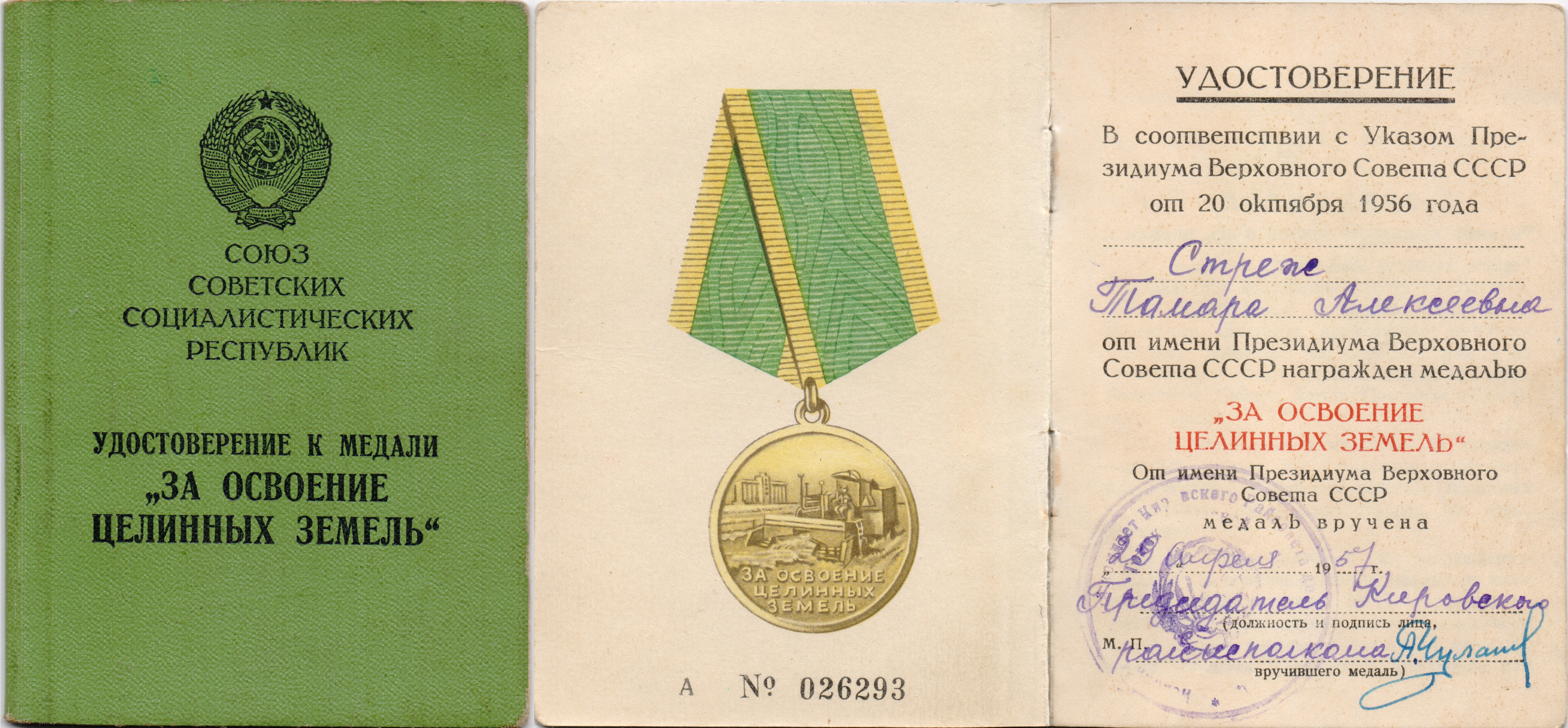
Award attestation booklet of the Medal "For the Development of Virgin Lands" (cover and inside pages).

Each medal was accompanied by an attestation of award, which took the form of a small 8 cm by 11 cm cardboard booklet containing the award's name, the recipient's details, and an official stamp and signature on the inside.

== Recipients (partial list) ==
The individuals below were all recipients of the Medal "For the Development of Virgin Lands".

- Nikolay Ivanovich Merkushkin
- Lyudmila Alekseevna Lyadova
- Pyotr Mironovich Masherov
- Ivan Ivanovich Fedyuninsky
- Viktor Vasilyevich Gorbatko
- Gennadi Vasiliyevich Sarafanov
- Leonid Denisovich Kizim
- Boris Borisovich Yegorov
- Pavel Romanovich Popovich
- Dmitriy Feodorovich Ustinov
- Vladimir Aleksandrovich Shatalov
- Vitaly Mikhaylovich Zholobov
- Aleksei Aleksandrovich Gubarev
- Pavel Ivanovich Belyayev
- Valery Fyodorovich Bykovsky
- Georgy Mikhaylovich Grechko
- Lev Stepanovich Dyomin
- Konstantin Petrovich Feoktistov
- Vladimir Mikhaylovich Komarov

== See also ==
- Virgin Lands Campaign
- Nikita Khrushchev
- Awards and decorations of the Soviet Union
