= Pingvin exercise suit =

Russian spacesuit

The Pingvin exercise suit (also Penguin suit) is a Russian anti-zero-G suit to be worn during spaceflight, designed to mimic the effects of gravity on the body, thus counteracting the loss of bone and muscle in weightlessness. The suit has elastic bands connected to a waistband that create tension between the waist and the feet and between the shoulders and the waist, thus creating a force for the body to work against. Cosmonauts reported the suit to be uncomfortable and prone to overheating. After ground tests in 1971 at Baikonur and in-orbit tests in 1975 on the Salyut 3, it was in use on the Mir, and routinely during long Soviet spaceflights from 1978 on. Variants were developed for therapeutic use in people with movement problems.
