= Marina Popovich =

Soviet Air Force colonel, engineer and test pilot

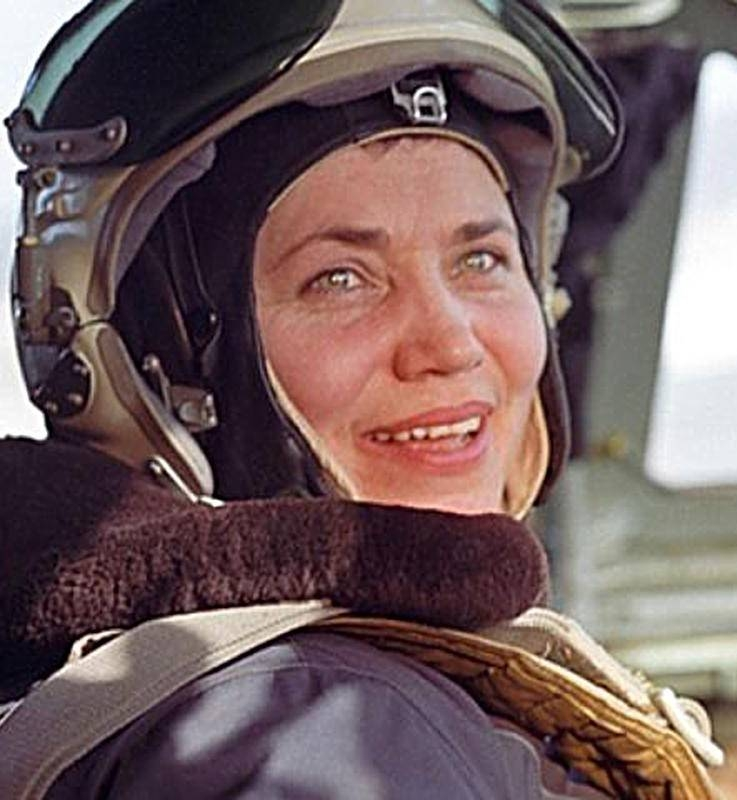
- Born: Marina Lavrentyevna Vasilyeva; 30 July 1931; Leonenki, Velizhsky District, Russian SFSR, Soviet Union
- Died: 30 November 2017 (aged 86); Krasnodar, Russia
- Occupations: Pilot, author
- Known for: 102 world records
- Spouse(s): Pavel Popovich (divorced) Boris Zhikhorev
- Children: 2 daughters

Marina Lavrentyevna Zhikhoreva (Russian: Марина Лаврентьевна Жихорева; formerly Popovich [Попович]; née Vasilyeva [Васильева]; 30 July 1931 – 30 November 2017) was a Soviet Air Forces colonel, engineer, and decorated Soviet test pilot. In 1964, she became the third woman and the first Soviet woman to break the sound barrier. Known as "Madame MiG", for her work in the Soviet fighter, she set more than one hundred aviation world records on over 40 types of aircraft over her career.

== Biography ==
Marina Vasilyeva was born on 30 July 1931 in the Velizhsky District of Smolensk Oblast, but evacuated with her family to Novosibirsk during World War II.

She began learning to fly as a child but, following the war, the Soviet Union barred women from serving as military pilots. At the age of 16, presenting herself as 22 years old, she wrote to Soviet Marshal Kliment Voroshilov asking to be admitted to a flying school. Voroshilov intervened on her behalf and she was admitted to the Novosibirsk Aviation Technicum where she graduated in 1951.

Initially, she worked as an engineer, then later as a flying instructor. In 1962, she entered into the first group of women that would train to become cosmonauts in the Soviet space program. After two months of training, she was turned away from the program. Her husband, Pavel Popovich, was admitted to the program, becoming the eighth person in space aboard Vostok 4 in 1962.

She became a Soviet Air Forces pilot in 1963, and in 1964 was admitted as a military test-pilot. Later that year (June 10), she broke the sound barrier in a MiG-21. She entered the military reserves in 1978 and then joined the Antonov Design Bureau as a test pilot. At Antonov, she set ten flight records on the Antonov An-22 turboprop. She retired in 1984.

Marina Popovich, a Russian Writers' Union member, authored nine books, including the poetry collection Zhizn – vechny vzlyot (Life's An Eternal Rise, 1972). She was a co-author of two film scripts, Nebo So Mnoy (Sky Is With Me, 1974) and Buket Fialok (Bouquet of Violets, 1983).

A star in the Cancer constellation bears her name.

Popovich died on November 30, 2017. She was buried with military honors at the Federal Military Memorial Cemetery.

=== Claims about UFOs ===
Marina Popovich spoke about her experience with UFOs in her book titled UFO Glasnost (published in 1991 in Germany) and in public lectures and interviews. She claimed that the Soviet military and civilian pilots had confirmed 3000 UFO sightings and that the Soviet Air Forces and KGB had recovered fragments of five crashed UFOs. The crash sites were Tunguska (1908), Novosibirsk, Tallinn, Ordzhonikidze and Dalnegorsk (1986).

== Private life ==
Marina Popovich's first husband was Pavel Popovich, a former Soviet cosmonaut, with whom she had two daughters, Natalya (b. 1956) and Oksana (b. 1968), both Moscow State Institute of International Relations graduates. She had two granddaughters, Tatyana and Alexandra, and grandson Michael, the latter born in England. Her second husband was retired Russian Air Force Major General Boris Alexandrovich Zhikhorev, deputy chairman of the Central Committee of the Union of the Soviet Officers.

== Awards and honors ==
- Order of the Red Banner of Labour
- Order of the Badge of Honour
- Honoured Master of Sport of the USSR
- FAI Gold Air Medal

== See also ==
- Nina Rusakova
- Olga Yamshchikova
- Jacqueline Cochran
