= Yuri Artyukhin =

Soviet cosmonaut (1930–1998)

- Юрий Артюхин
- Born: 22 June 1930; Pershutino, Moscow Oblast, Russian SFSR, Soviet Union
- Died: 4 August 1998 (aged 68); Zvyozdny Gorodok, Russia
- Occupation: Pilot
- Awards: Hero of the Soviet Union
- Space career

Cosmonaut
- Rank: Colonel, Soviet Air Force
- Time in space: 15d 17h 30m
- Selection: Air Force Group 2
- Missions: Soyuz 14

Yuri Petrovich Artyukhin (Russian: Ю́рий Петро́вич Артю́хин; 22 June 1930 – 4 August 1998) was a Soviet Russian cosmonaut and engineer who made a single flight into space.

Artyukhin graduated from the Soviet Air Force Institute with a doctorate in engineering, specializing in military communication systems. He was selected for the space programme in 1963 and would have flown on the Voskhod 3 mission had it not been canceled. He made his single flight on Soyuz 14 in 1974, where his area of expertise was presumably put to good use.

He left the space programme in 1982 and held various positions in space-related fields. Most notably, he was involved in the development of the Soviet space shuttle Buran and in cosmonaut training.

He died of cancer on 4 August 1998.

He was awarded:

- Hero of the Soviet Union
- Pilot-Cosmonaut of the USSR
- Order of Lenin
- Order of the Red Star
- Medal "For Distinction in Guarding the State Border of the USSR"
- Jan Krasicki Cross (Poland)
