= Gennady Sarafanov =

Soviet cosmonaut (1942–2005)

- Геннадий Сарафанов
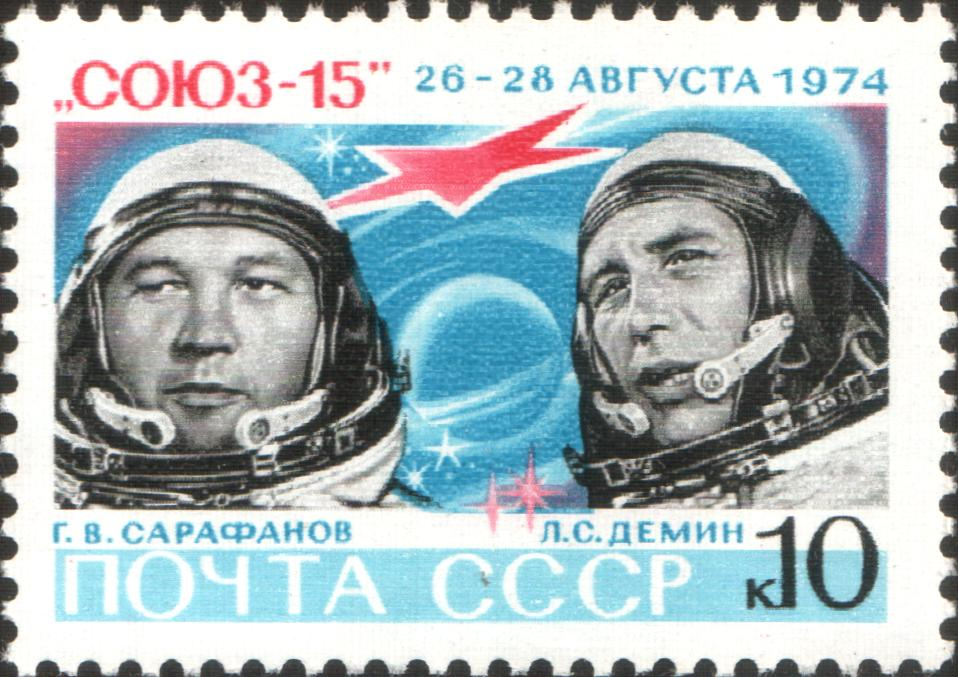
- Born: 1 January 1942; Sinenkie, Saratov Oblast, USSR
- Died: 29 September 2005 (aged 63); Moscow, Russia
- Occupation: Pilot
- Space career

Cosmonaut
- Rank: Colonel, Soviet Air Force
- Time in space: 2 days 0 hours 12 minutes
- Selection: Air Force Group 3
- Missions: Soyuz 15

Gennady Vasiliyevich Sarafanov (Russian: Геннадий Васильевич Сарафанов; 1 January 1942 – 29 September 2005) was a Soviet cosmonaut who flew on the Soyuz 15 spaceflight in 1974. This mission was intended to dock with the space station Salyut 3, but failed to do so after the docking system malfunctioned.

Sarafanov was born in Sinenkiye, Saratov Oblast, USSR. He graduated from the Soviet Air Force academy and held the rank of colonel.

He made a single spaceflight before resigning from the space programme in 1986 and subsequently lectured on technology. He died in Moscow, Russia.

He was awarded:

- Hero of the Soviet Union
- Pilot-Cosmonaut of the USSR
- Jubilee Medal "In Commemoration of the 100th Anniversary since the Birth of Vladimir Il'ich Lenin"
- Medal "For Distinction in Guarding the State Border of the USSR"
- Medal "For the Development of Virgin Lands"
