= DOS-2 =

Failed Soviet space station (1972)

Station statistics
- Crew: 2
- Launch: 29 July 1972; 03:21 UTC
- Launch pad: LC-81/24, Baikonur Cosmodrome, USSR
- Mass: 18,425 kg (40,620 lb)
- Length: 14 m
- Width: 4.15 m
- Pressurised volume: c.100 m³ (3,500 ft³)
- Days in orbit: 0 days (Launch failure)
- Configuration
- Planned orbital configuration of DOS-2

DOS-2 was a space station, launched as part of the Salyut programme.

== History ==
It was lost in a launch failure on 29 July 1972, when the failure of the second stage of its Proton-K launch vehicle prevented the station from achieving orbit. It instead fell into the Pacific Ocean. The station, which would have been given the designation Salyut 2 had it reached orbit, was structurally identical to Salyut 1, as it had been assembled as a backup unit for that station. Four teams of cosmonauts were formed to crew the station, of which two would have flown:

- Alexei Leonov and Valeri Kubasov
- Vasily Lazarev and Oleg Makarov
- Aleksei Gubarev and Georgi Grechko
- Pyotr Klimuk and Vitaly Sevastyanov

Whilst Salyut 1 had been attempted to be visited by two three-person crews (Soyuz 10 and Soyuz 11), following modifications to the Soyuz 7KT-OK spacecraft (resulting in the new model Soyuz 7K-T) following the deaths of the crew of Soyuz 11, the spacecraft could only carry two cosmonauts, thus DOS-2 would have had two crews of two. Following the loss of the station, the crews were transferred to the DOS-3 programme.
