= Zvyozdny gorodok (urban-type settlement) =

Zvyozdny gorodok Звёздный городок
- Work settlement
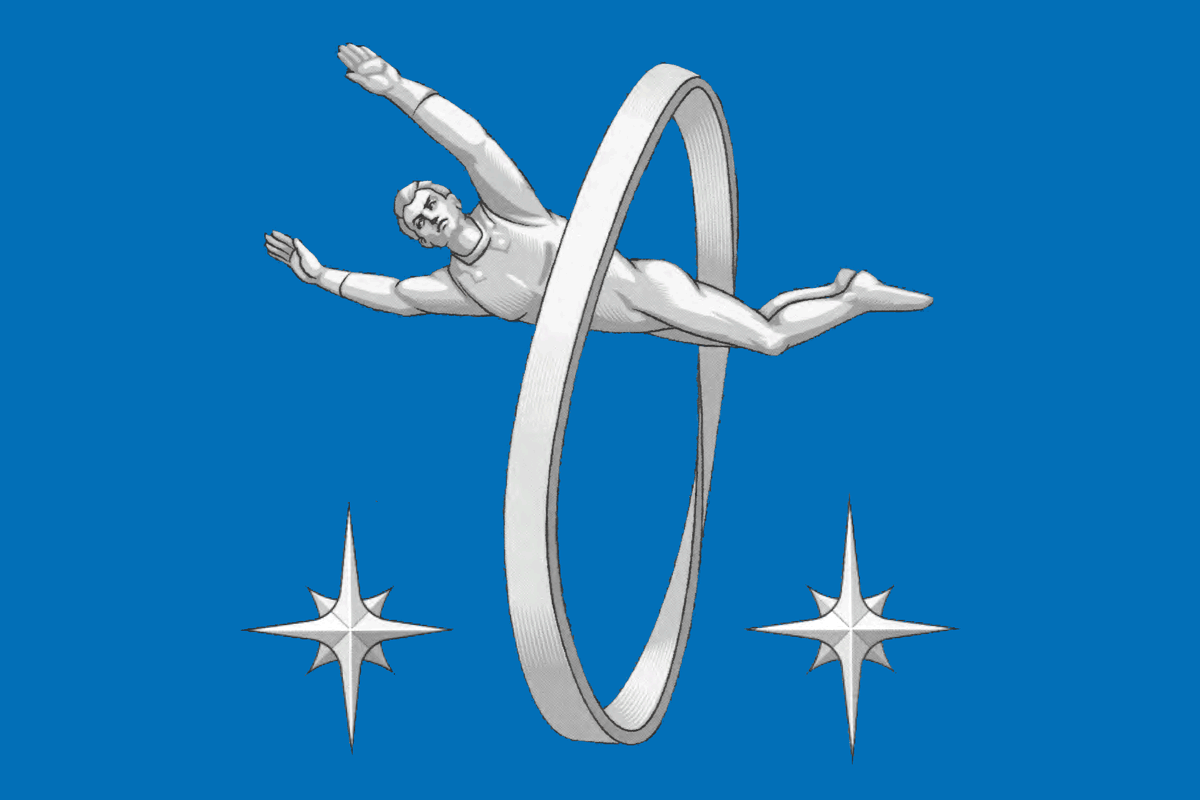
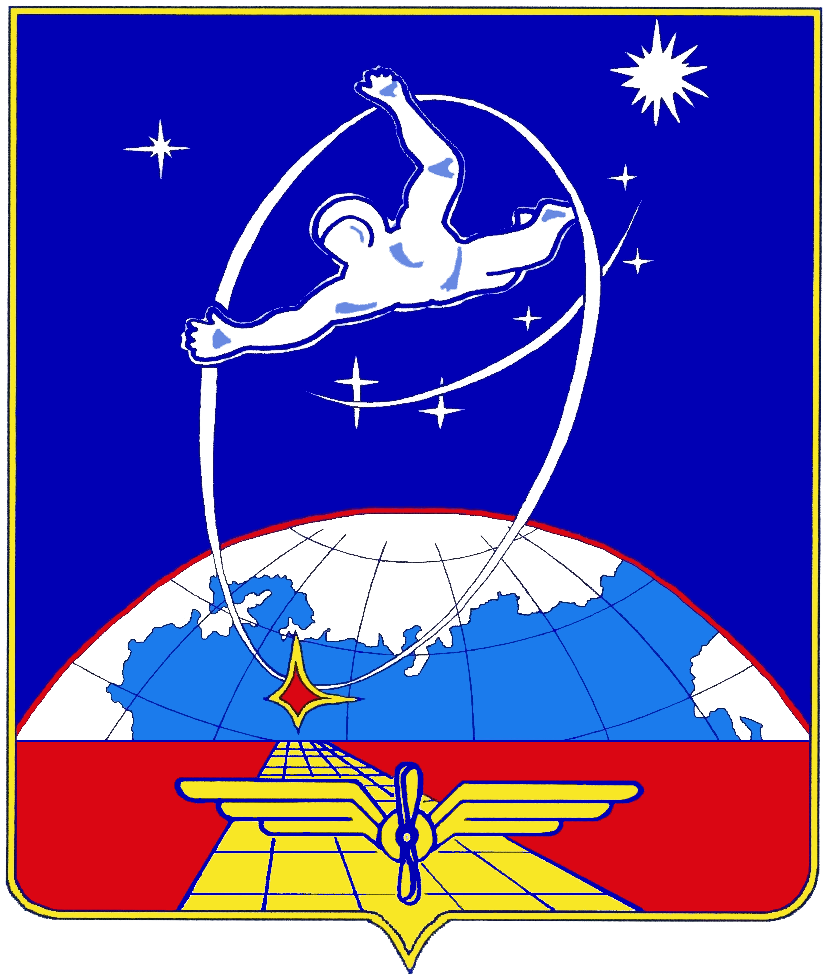
- Flag Coat of arms
- Interactive map of Zvyozdny gorodok
- Location of Zvyozdny gorodok Zvyozdny gorodok (Moscow Oblast)
- Coordinates: 55°52′38″N 38°06′48″E
- Country: Russia
- Federal subject: Moscow Oblast
- Founded: June 16, 2009
- Urban-type settlement status since: June 16, 2009

Area
  - Total: 3.178 km^{2} (1.227 sq mi)

Population (2010 Census)
  - Total: 6,332
  - Estimate (2025): 7,559 (+19.4%)
  - Density: 1,992/km^{2} (5,160/sq mi)

Administrative status
  - Subordinated to: closed administrative-territorial formation of Zvyozdny gorodok
  - Capital of: closed administrative-territorial formation of Zvyozdny gorodok

Municipal status
  - Urban okrug: Zvyozdny gorodok Urban Okrug
  - Capital of: Zvyozdny gorodok Urban Okrug
- Time zone: UTC+3 (MSK)
- Postal code: 141160
- OKTMO ID: 46774000051
- Website: zato-zvezdny.ru

Zvyozdny gorodok (Russian: Звёздный городо́к), also known by its anglicized name Star City, is a closed urban locality (a work settlement) in Moscow Oblast, Russia. It is home to the military research and space training facility known as Star City in English. Population: 6,332 (2010 census).

== History ==
For most of its history, the space training center known in English as Star City was in jurisdiction of the Soviet and then Russian military. However, in August 1996, due to the changes in legislation the center became subordinated both to the Ministry of Defense and to the Russian Space Agency. This double status remained in effect until October 1, 2008, when the center was re-organized and subordinated directly and solely to the by-then-renamed Russian Federal Space Agency. As a result, the status of the territory of Star City was changed from military to civil. A closed administrative-territorial formation was established on the territory of the closed military townlet #1 (Star City's official designation) on January 19, 2009. On August 5, 2009, Boris Gromov, the Governor of Moscow Oblast, issued a Resolution which transformed the military townlet into an urban-type settlement. On October 29, the urban-type settlement was named "Zvyozdny gorodok"; however, as of 2011, this name is not yet official pending the approval by the Government of Russia.

== Administrative and municipal status ==
Within the framework of administrative divisions, it is incorporated as the closed administrative-territorial formation of Zvyozdny gorodok—an administrative unit with the status equal to that of the districts. As a municipal division, the closed administrative-territorial formation of Zvyozdny gorodok is incorporated as Zvyozdny gorodok Urban Okrug.

== Twin towns ==
- Slovenske Konjice, Slovenia
