= Kosmos 557 =

Failed Soviet space station (1973)

Kosmos 557 (DOS-3)
- Salyut programme insignia

Station statistics
- COSPAR ID: 1973-026A
- SATCAT no.: 6498
- Crew: 3 (intended)
- Launch: 11 May 1973, 00:20:00 UTC
- Launch pad: LC-81/23, Baikonur Cosmodrome, USSR
- Reentry: 22 May 1973; 52 years ago
- Mass: 19,400 kg (42,800 lb)
- Periapsis altitude: 218 km (135 mi)
- Apoapsis altitude: 266 km (165 mi)
- Orbital inclination: 51.6 degrees
- Orbital period: 89.1 minutes
- Days in orbit: 11 days (22 May 1973)
- Days occupied: 0 days (22 May 1973)
- No. of orbits: ~175 (22 May 1973)
- Statistics as of 11 May 1973 (Unless noted otherwise)
- Configuration
- The planned orbital configuration of DOS-3

Kosmos 557 (Russian: Космос 557 meaning Cosmos 557), originally designated DOS-3, was the third space station in the Salyut program. It was originally intended to be launched as Salyut-3, but due to its failure to achieve orbit on May 11, 1973, three days before the launch of Skylab, it was renamed Kosmos-557.

Due to errors in the flight control system while out of the range of ground control, the station fired its attitude thruster until it consumed all of its attitude control fuel and became uncontrollable before raising its orbit to the desired altitude. Since the spacecraft was already in orbit and had been registered by Western radar, the Soviets disguised the launch as "Kosmos 557" and quietly allowed it to reenter Earth's atmosphere and burn up a week later. It was revealed to have been a Salyut station only much later.

== See also ==
- 1973 in spaceflight
