= Kosmos 434 =

Third and final uncrewed test flight of the Soviet lunar module

- LK Lander
- Mission type: Spacecraft test
- Operator: Soviet space program
- COSPAR ID: 1971-069A
- SATCAT no.: 5407
- Mission duration: 10 years and 11 days

Spacecraft properties
- Spacecraft: T2K No.3
- Manufacturer: OKB-1
- Launch mass: 7,000 kilograms (15,000 lb)

Start of mission
- Launch date: 12 August 1971, 09:30 UTC
- Rocket: Soyuz-L
- Launch site: Baikonur 31/6

End of mission
- Decay date: 23 August 1981

Orbital parameters
- Reference system: Geocentric
- Regime: Medium Earth
- Semi-major axis: 12,353.00 kilometres (7,675.80 mi)
- Eccentricity: 0.46911647
- Perigee altitude: 187 kilometres (116 mi)
- Apogee altitude: 11,777 kilometres (7,318 mi)
- Inclination: 51.5 degrees
- Period: 227.94 minutes
- Epoch: 11 September 1971

Kosmos 434 (Russian: Космос 434; meaning Cosmos 434), also known as T2K No.3, was the final uncrewed test flight of the Soviet LK Lander. It performed the longest burn of the four uncrewed LK Lander tests, validating the backup rocket engine of the LK's Blok E propulsion system. It finished in a 186 km by 11,804 km orbit. This test qualified the lander as flightworthy.

The LK was the only element of the Soviet human lunar programs that reached this status. In 1980-81 there were fears that it might carry nuclear fuel. When it reentered over Australia on August 22, 1981 the Soviet Foreign Ministry in Australia admitted that Kosmos 434 was an "experiment unit of a lunar cabin," or lunar lander.

== See also ==
- 1971 in spaceflight
