= Soyuz 7K-L1E =

Soviet uncrewed spacecraft

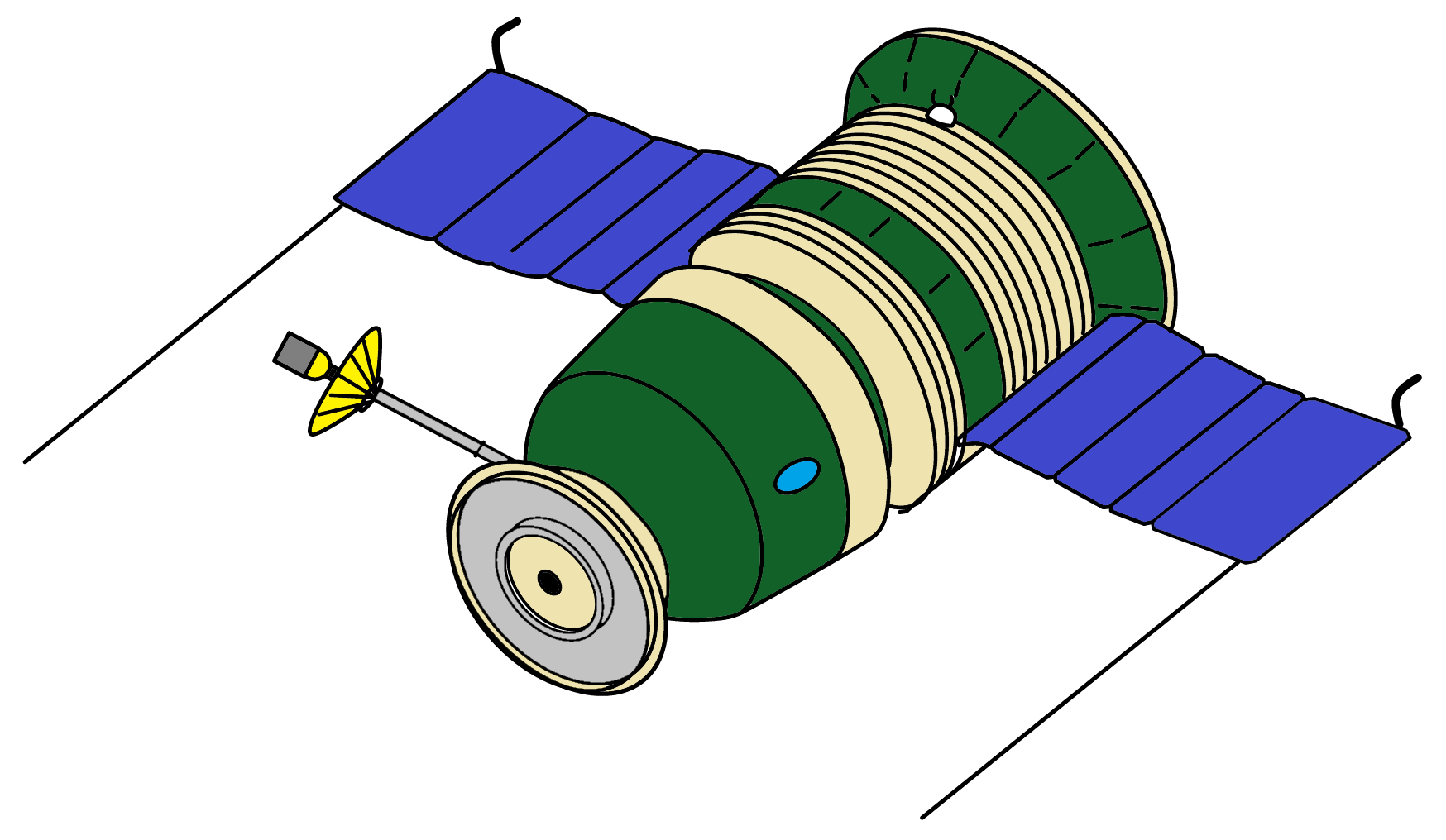
- Manufacturer: Korolev
- Country of origin: Soviet Union
- Operator: Soviet space program
- Applications: Uncrewed spacecraft around the Moon and back to Earth

Production
- Status: Program ended. One craft orbited, one craft failed
- Built: 2
- Launched: 2
- Retired: 1971

Related spacecraft
- Derived from: Soyuz 7K-OK and Soyuz 7K-L1

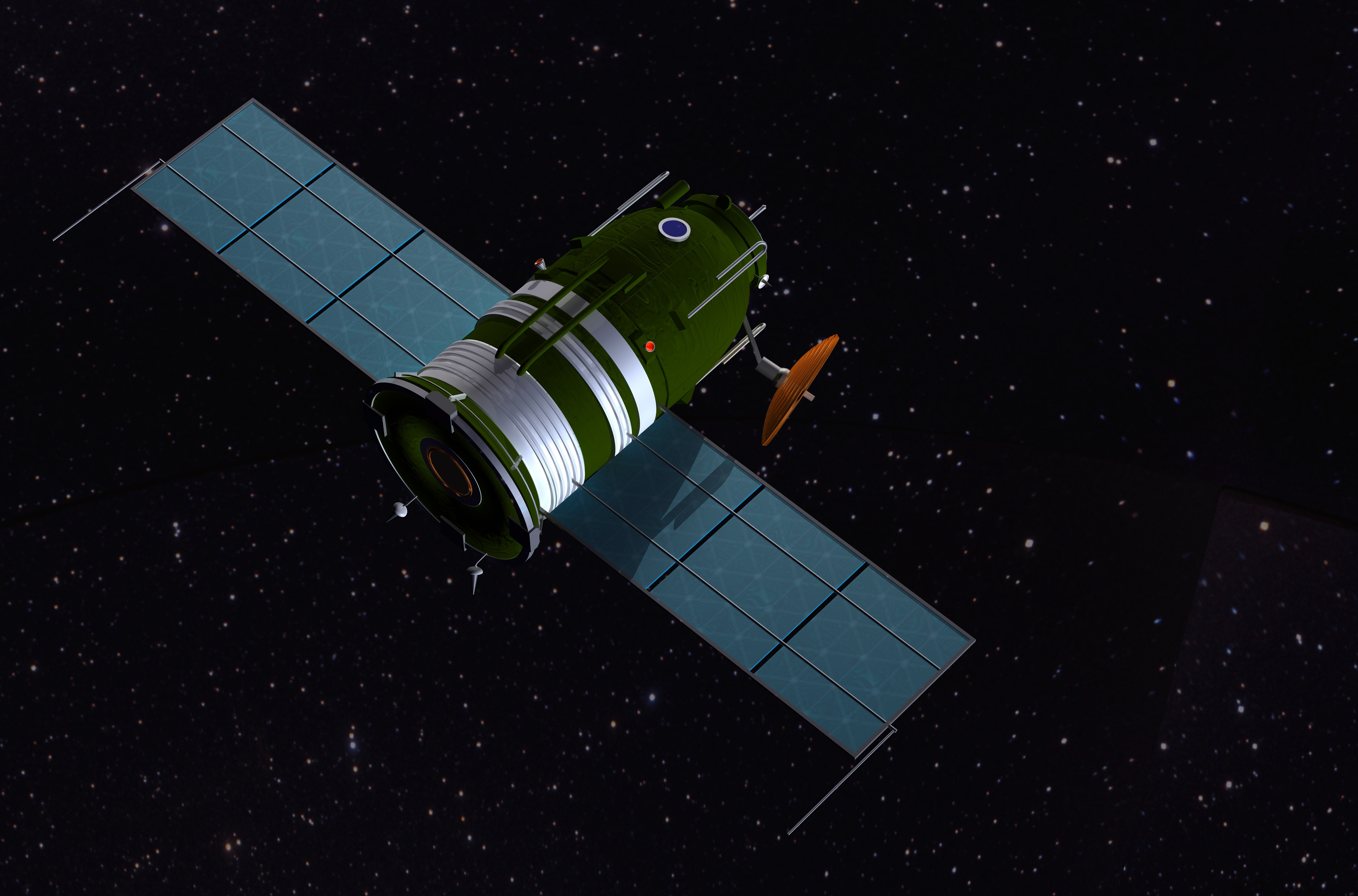
Artist's impression of the Soyuz 7K-L1 en route to the Moon

Soyuz 7K-L1E was a Soviet uncrewed modified Soyuz 7K-L1 spacecraft, also known as a dummy Soyuz 7K-LOK. Two were built, with one successfully launched into Low Earth Orbit on a Proton rocket in December 1970; the other Soyuz 7K-L1E was placed on an N1 rocket, which failed at launch in June 1971. The Soyuz spacecraft was first used in 1967 as the main crewed spacecraft of the Soviet Union and is still in use today. Many Soyuz variations have been built, with the Soyuz 7K-L1E being an uncrewed variation.

== Soyuz 7K-L1E No.1 ==
Soyuz 7K-L1E No.1 was launched on 26 June 1971 at 23:15:08 (11:15pm Moscow time) from Baikonur Cosmodrome Site 110/37. The spacecraft was built to test the Blok D rocket and the N-1 rocket. This was the third launch of the N-1. The previous two N-1 launches had failed. The N-1 Rocket was a super heavy-lift launch vehicle design to go to the moon, as a counterpart to the U.S. Saturn V rocket in the space race. The first stage of the N-1 serial 6L failed at launch. The Soyuz 7K-L1E had no escape rescue system and was lost. The Block D was designed to work with the N-1 to take the LK lunar lander to near the surface of the Moon. The Block D stage is still in use, but is used atop a Proton rocket. Had Soyuz 7K-L1E No.1 worked the upper stage was planned to go through maneuvers simulating those that would be used on a lunar mission. The Block D rocket would have taken the LK lunar lander to near the surface of the Moon.

== Soyuz 7K-L1E No.2 ==
Soyuz 7K-L1E No.2 was an uncrewed Soyuz 7K-L1, launched on a Proton, with an N-1 upper stage and the Soyuz 7K-L1E control spacecraft into Earth orbit on 2 December 1970. This flight was a success and was then designated "Cosmos 382" - "Kosmos 382". Kosmos being the title given Soviet satellites since 1962. Kosmos-382 carried experiments and simulating the lunar orbit insertion burn, for planned later crewed missions to the Moon.

== See also ==
- 1970 in spaceflight
- Zond program
