= 1970 in spaceflight =

Orbital launches
- First: 11 February
- Last: 12 December
- Successes: 124
- Failures: 10
- Catalogued: 114

National firsts
- Satellite: Japan; China
- Orbital launch: Japan; China

1970 in spaceflight

Japan and China each launched their first satellites in 1970, bringing the total number of nations with independent launch capability to five.

Apollo 13 was launched; after suffering an explosion in deep space it had to circumnavigate the moon and use the LM as a life boat. Apollo 13 was a successful disaster in which the crew survived. The Soviet space program continued its Luna program with Luna 17, which delivered the robotic Lunokhod 1 rover to the lunar surface, and Luna 16, which achieved the first uncrewed lunar sample return. The Soviets also continued the success of the Venera Venus probes with Venera 7, the first man-made spacecraft to successfully land on another planet and to transmit data back to Earth, though it only survived 23 minutes on the surface.

== Orbital Launches ==
This is a list of spaceflights launched in 1970.

- ← Jan
- Feb
- Mar
- Apr
- May
- Jun
- Jul
- Aug
- Sep
- Oct
- Nov
- Dec →

Date and time (UTC)	Rocket	Flight number	Launch site		LSP	
Date and time (UTC)	Payload	Operator	Orbit	Function	Decay (UTC)	Outcome
Date and time (UTC)	Remarks					
=== January ===
9 January	(Soviet Union) Voskhod		(Soviet Union) Baikonur Site 31/6		RVSN RF	
9 January	(Soviet Union) Kosmos 318 (Zenit-2M №7, Gektor №7)	GRU	Low Earth Orbit	Reconnaissance	In orbit	Successful
14 January	(United States) Titan IIIB Agena-D		(United States) Vandenberg SLC-4W			
14 January	(United States) OPS 6531 KH-8 4325	USAF	Low Earth	Reconnaissance	In orbit	Successful
15 January	(United States) Delta M		(United States) Cape Canaveral LC-17A			
15 January	(United Nations) Intelsat III F6	Intelsat	Geosynchronous	Communications	In orbit	Successful
15 January	(Soviet Union) Kosmos-2		(Soviet Union) Plesetsk Site 133/1		RVSN RF	
15 January	(Soviet Union) Kosmos 319 (DS-P1-Yu №29)	Yuzhnoye	Low Earth Orbit	Radar calibration	In orbit	Successful
16 January	(Soviet Union) Kosmos-2		(Soviet Union) Kapustin Yar LC-86/4		RVSN RF	
16 January	(Soviet Union) Kosmos 320 (DS-MO №2, Opticheski №2)	Yuzhnoye	Low Earth Orbit	Technology Demonstration	In orbit	Successful
20 January	(Soviet Union) Kosmos-2		(Soviet Union) Plesetsk Site 133/1			
20 January	(Soviet Union) Kosmos 321 (DS-U2-MG №1)		Low Earth Orbit	Magnetospheric Astronomy	In orbit	Successful
21 January	(Soviet Union) Voskhod		(Soviet Union) Plesetsk Site 41/1		RVSN RF	
21 January	(Soviet Union) Kosmos 322 (Zenit-4 №68)	GRU	Low Earth Orbit	Reconnaissance	In orbit	Successful
23 January	(United States) Delta N6		(United States) Vandenberg SLC-2W			
23 January	(United States) TIROS M (ITOS 1)	NOAA	Low Earth	Meteorology	In orbit	Successful
23 January	(Australia) Australis	University of Melbourne	Low Earth	Communications	In orbit	Successful
30 January	(Soviet Union) Kosmos-2		(Soviet Union) Plesetsk Site 133/1		RVSN RF	
30 January	(Soviet Union) DS-P1-I №7	Yuzhnoye	Low Earth Orbit	Radar calibration	In orbit	Failure
=== February ===
4 February	(United States) Thorad-SLV2G Agena-D		(United States) Vandenberg SLC-2E			
4 February	(United States) SERT 2	NASA Lewis research center	Low Earth	Technology Demonstration	In orbit	Successful
6 February	(Soviet Union) Proton K / D		(Soviet Union) Pad 81/23, Baikonur		MOM	
6 February	(Soviet Union) Ye-8-5 No.405	MOM	Selenocentric	Lunar lander	In orbit	Failure
10 February	(Soviet Union) Voskhod		(Soviet Union) Site 41/1, Plesetsk			
10 February	(Soviet Union) Kosmos 323 (Zenit-4 #69)	GRU	Low Earth Orbit	Reconnaissance	In orbit	Successful
11 February	(Japan) Lambda-4S		(Japan) Kagoshima		Japan	
11 February	(Japan) Ohsumi	Tokyo University	Low Earth	Technology	2 August 2003	Successful
11 February	First satellite launched by Japan, final flight of L-4S					
11 February	(United States) Thor LV-2F Burner 2		(United States) Vandenberg SLC-10W			
11 February	(United States) OPS 0054 DMSP-5A F1		SSO	Meteorology	In orbit	Successful
19 February	(Soviet Union) Molniya-M/ML		(Soviet Union) Site 43/4, Plesetsk			
19 February	(Soviet Union) Molniya-1 13		Molniya	Communications	In orbit	Successful
27 February	(Soviet Union) Kosmos-2		(Soviet Union) Plesetsk Site 133/1			
27 February	(Soviet Union) Kosmos 324 (DS-P1-Yu #30)		Low Earth Orbit	Calibration	In orbit	Successful
=== March ===
4 March	(Soviet Union) Voskhod		(Soviet Union) Site 43/4, Plesetsk			
4 March	(Soviet Union) Kosmos 325 (Zenit-2 #79)	GRU	Low Earth Orbit	Reconnaissance	In orbit	Successful
4 March	(United States) Thorad-SLV2H Agena-D		(United States) Vandenberg SLC-3W			
4 March	(United States) OPS 0440 KH-4B 1109		Low Earth	Reconnaissance	In orbit	Successful
4 March	(United States) OPS 3402 Tivoli 3	USAF	Low Earth	ELINT	In orbit	Successful
10 March; 12:20	(France) Diamant B		(France) Kourou ELD		(France) CNES	
10 March; 12:20	(Germany) DIAL-WIKA	DFVLR	Elliptical low Earth	Upper atmosphere research	5 October 1978	Successful
10 March; 12:20	(Germany) DIAL-MIKA	DFVLR	Elliptical low Earth	Launch vehicle evaluation	9 September 1974	Spacecraft failure
10 March; 12:20	Maiden flight of Diamant B, the first orbital launch from Kourou and South America in general					
13 March	(Soviet Union) Voskhod		(Soviet Union) Site 43/4, Plesetsk			
13 March	(Soviet Union) Kosmos 326 (Zenit-2 #80)	GRU	Low Earth Orbit	Reconnaissance	In orbit	Successful
17 March	(Soviet Union) Vostok-2M		(Soviet Union) Site 41/1, Plesetsk			
17 March	(Soviet Union) Meteor-1 3		Low Earth Orbit	Meteorology	In orbit	Successful
18 March	(Soviet Union) Kosmos-2		(Soviet Union) Site 133/1, Plesetsk			
18 March	(Soviet Union) Kosmos 327 (DS-P1-I #8)	Yuzhnoye	Low Earth Orbit	Radar calibration	In orbit	Successful
20 March	(United States) Delta M		(United States) Cape Canaveral LC-17B			
20 March	NATO 2A	NATO	Geosynchronous	Military Communication	In orbit	Successful
27 March	(Soviet Union) Voskhod		(Soviet Union) Site 41/1, Plesetsk			
27 March	(Soviet Union) Kosmos 328 (Zenit-2MK #2, Germes #2)	GRU	Low Earth Orbit	Reconnaissance	In orbit	Successful
=== April ===
3 April	(Soviet Union) Voskhod		(Soviet Union) Site 43/4, Plesetsk			
3 April	(Soviet Union) Kosmos 329 (Zenit-2M #8, Gektor #8)	GRU	Low Earth Orbit	Reconnaissance	In orbit	Successful
7 April	(Soviet Union) Kosmos-3M		(Soviet Union) Plesetsk			
7 April	(Soviet Union) Kosmos 330 (Tselina O #6)		Low Earth Orbit	SIGNIT	In orbit	Successful
8 April	(United States) Thorad-SLV2G Agena-D		(United States) Vandenberg SLC-2E			
8 April	(United States) Nimbus 4	NOAA / NASA	Medium Earth	Meteorology	In orbit	Successful
8 April	(United States) Topo 1	US Army	Medium Earth	Geodesy	In orbit	Successful
8 April	(Soviet Union) Voskhod		(Soviet Union) Site 31/6, Baikonur			
8 April	(Soviet Union) Kosmos 331 (Zenit-4 #70)	GRU	Low Earth Orbit	Reconnaissance	In orbit	Successful
8 April	(United States) Titan IIIC		(United States) Cape Canaveral LC-40			
8 April	(United States) OPS 7033 Vela 11	USAF		Reconnaissance	In orbit	Successful
8 April	(United States) OPS 7044 Vela 12	USAF		Reconnaissance	In orbit	Successful
11 April	(Soviet Union) Kosmos-3M		(Soviet Union) Plesetsk			
11 April	(Soviet Union) Kosmos 332 (Zaliv #5)		Medium Earth	Navigation	In orbit	Successful
11 April; 19:13	(United States) Saturn V (C-5)		(United States) Kennedy LC-39A		(United States) NASA	
11 April; 19:13	(United States) Apollo 13 CSM Odyssey	NASA	Intended: Lunar orbit Actual: Lunar free return	Crewed lunar orbit.	15 April 1970	Failure
11 April; 19:13	(United States) Apollo 13 LM Aquarius	NASA	Intended: Lunar landing Actual: Lunar free return	Crewed lunar landing	15 April 1970	Failure
11 April; 19:13	Explosion in Service Module crippled spacecraft, resulting in mission abort. Mission aborted due to CSM malfunction. LM used to help bring crew back to Earth.					
15 April	(Soviet Union) Voskhod		(Soviet Union) Site 41/1, Plesetsk			
15 April	(Soviet Union) Kosmos 333 (Zenit-4M #4, Rotor #4)	GRU	Low Earth Orbit	Reconnaissance	In orbit	Successful
15 April	(United States) Titan IIIB Agena-D		(United States) Vandenberg SLC-4W			
15 April	(United States) OPS 2863 KH-8 4326	USAF	Low Earth	Reconnaissance	In orbit	Successful
23 April	(United States) Delta M		(United States) Cape Canaveral LC-17A			
23 April	(United Nations) Intelsat III F-7	Intelsat	Geosynchronous	Communication	In orbit	Successful
23 April	(Soviet Union) Kosmos-2		(Soviet Union) Plesetsk Site 133/1			
23 April	(Soviet Union) Kosmos 334 (DS-P1-Yu #31)	Yuzhnoye	Low Earth Orbit	Radar calibration	In orbit	Successful
24 April; 13:35	(China) Long March 1	Y1	(China) Jiuquan LA-2A		(China) CASC	
24 April; 13:35	(China) Dong Fang Hong I	CAST	Medium Earth	Technology demonstration	In orbit	Successful
24 April; 13:35	First satellite launched by China.					
24 April	(Soviet Union) Kosmos-2		(Soviet Union) Kapustin Yar			
24 April	(Soviet Union) Kosmos 335 (DS-U1-R #1)	Yuzhnoye	Low Earth Orbit	Research	In orbit	Successful
25 April	(Soviet Union) Kosmos-3M		(Soviet Union) Plesetsk			
25 April	(Soviet Union) Kosmos 336 (Strela-1M #1)		Low Earth Orbit	Military Communication	In orbit	Successful
25 April	(Soviet Union) Kosmos 337 (Strela-1M #2)		Low Earth Orbit	Military Communication	In orbit	Successful
25 April	(Soviet Union) Kosmos 338 (Strela-1M #3)		Low Earth Orbit	Military Communication	In orbit	Successful
25 April	(Soviet Union) Kosmos 339 (Strela-1M #4)		Low Earth Orbit	Military Communication	In orbit	Successful
25 April	(Soviet Union) Kosmos 340 (Strela-1M #5)		Low Earth Orbit	Military Communication	In orbit	Successful
25 April	(Soviet Union) Kosmos 341 (Strela-1M #6)		Low Earth Orbit	Military Communication	In orbit	Successful
25 April	(Soviet Union) Kosmos 342 (Strela-1M #7)		Low Earth Orbit	Military Communication	In orbit	Successful
25 April	(Soviet Union) Kosmos 336 (Strela-1M #8)		Low Earth Orbit	Military Communication	In orbit	Successful
28 April	(Soviet Union) Vostok-2M		(Soviet Union) Site 41/1, Plesetsk			
28 April	(Soviet Union) Meteor-1 4		Medium Earth	Meteorology	In orbit	Successful
=== May ===
12 May	(Soviet Union) Voskhod		(Soviet Union) Site 41/1, Plesetsk			
12 May	(Soviet Union) Kosmos 344 (Zenit-2 #81)	GRU	Low Earth Orbit	Reconnaissance	In orbit	Successful
20 May	(Soviet Union) Voskhod		(Soviet Union) Site 31/6, Baikonur			
20 May	(Soviet Union) Kosmos 345 (Zenit-4 #71)	GRU	Low Earth Orbit	Reconnaissance	In orbit	Successful
20 May	(United States) Thorad-SLV2H Agena-D		(United States) Vandenberg SLC-3W			
20 May	(United States) OPS 4720 KH-4B 1110	CIA	Low Earth	Reconnaissance	In orbit	Successful
20 May	(United States) OPS 8520 Tripos 4 / Sousea 3	USAF	Low Earth	Reconnaissance	In orbit	Successful
22 May	(Soviet Union) Kosmos-2		(Soviet Union) Plesetsk Site 133/1			
22 May	(Soviet Union) DS-P1-Yu #32	Yuzhnoye	Low Earth Orbit	Radar calibration	In orbit	Failure
=== June ===
1 June; 19:00	(Soviet Union) Soyuz (R-7/A-2)		(Soviet Union) Baikonur Site 1		(Soviet Union) RVSN	
1 June; 19:00	(Soviet Union) Soyuz 9	RVSN	Low Earth	Crewed Orbital Spaceflight	19 June 1970; 11:58	Successful
1 June; 19:00	Longest Crewed flight involving only one spacecraft. (As of 09/06/06)					
1 June; 19:00	(United Kingdom) Black Arrow		(United Kingdom) Woomera		(United Kingdom) RAE	
1 June; 19:00	(United Kingdom) Orba	RAE	Low Earth	Micrometeoroid detection satellite	In orbit	Failure
1 June; 19:00	First British attempt to launch a satellite. Failed to reach orbit after premature 2nd stage cutout.					
10 June	(Soviet Union) Voskhod		(Soviet Union) Site 31/6, Baikonur			
10 June	(Soviet Union) Kosmos 346 (Zenit-4 #72)	GRU	Low Earth Orbit	Reconnaissance	In orbit	Successful
12 June	Europa 1	F9	(Australia) Woomera LC-6A		ELDO	
12 June	STV 3	ELDO	Low Earth	Vehicle Evaluation	In orbit	Failure
12 June	Fairing failed to separate					
12 June	(Soviet Union) Kosmos-2		(Soviet Union) Kapustin Yar			
12 June	(Soviet Union) Kosmos 347 (DS-P1-Yu #33)	Yuzhnoye	Low Earth Orbit	Radar calibration	In orbit	Successful
13 June	(Soviet Union) Kosmos 2		(Soviet Union) Plesetsk Site 133/1			
13 June	(Soviet Union) Kosmos 348 (DS-U2-GK #2)	Yuzhnoye	Low Earth Orbit	Research	In orbit	Successful
17 June	(Soviet Union) Voskhod		(Soviet Union) Site 43/4, Plesetsk			
17 June	(Soviet Union) Kosmos 349 (Zenit-4 #73)	GRU	Low Earth Orbit	Reconnaissance	In orbit	Successful
19 June	(United States) Atlas-SLV3A Agena-D		(United States) Cape Canaveral LC-13			
19 June	(United States) OPS 5346 Aquacade (Rhyolite 1)	NRO / CIA	Geosynchronous	Reconnaissance	In orbit	Successful
23 June	(Soviet Union) Vostok-2M		(Soviet Union) Site 41/1, Plesetsk			
23 June	(Soviet Union) Meteor-1 5		Medium Earth	Meteorology	In orbit	Successful
25 April	(United States) Titan IIIB Agena-D		(United States) Vandenberg SLC-4W			
25 April	(United States) OPS 6820 KH-8 4327	USAF	Low Earth	Reconnaissance	In orbit	Successful
26 June	(Soviet Union) Molniya-M / ML		(Soviet Union) Site 43/4, Plesetsk			
26 June	(Soviet Union) Molniya-1 14 (Molniya-1 21L)		Molniya	Communication	In orbit	Successful
26 June	(Soviet Union) Voskhod		(Soviet Union) Site 31/6, Baikonur			
26 June	(Soviet Union) Kosmos 350 (Zenit-2M #9, Gektor #4)	GRU	Low Earth Orbit	Reconnaissance	In orbit	Successful
27 June	(Soviet Union) Kosmos-3M		(Soviet Union) Plesetsk Site 132/1			
27 June	(Soviet Union) Kosmos 351 (DS-P1-Yu #34)	Yuzhnoye	Low Earth Orbit	Radar calibration	In orbit	Successful
27 June	(Soviet Union) Kosmos 2		(Soviet Union) Plesetsk Site 133/1			
27 June	(Soviet Union) Strela-2M #1		Low Earth Orbit	Military Communication	In orbit	Failure
=== July ===
7 July	(Soviet Union) Voskhod		(Soviet Union) Site 31/6, Baikonur			
7 July	(Soviet Union) Kosmos 352 (Zenit-4 #72)	GRU	Low Earth Orbit	Reconnaissance	In orbit	Successful
9 July	(Soviet Union) Voskhod		(Soviet Union) Site 41/1, Plesetsk			
9 July	(Soviet Union) Kosmos 353 (Zenit-2M #4, Gektor #10)	GRU	Low Earth Orbit	Reconnaissance	In orbit	Successful
21 July	(Soviet Union) Voskhod		(Soviet Union) Site 43/4, Plesetsk			
21 July	(Soviet Union) Zenit-4 #75	GRU	Low Earth Orbit	Reconnaissance	In orbit	Failure
23 July	(United States) Thorad-SLV2H Agena-D		(United States) Vandenberg SLC-3W			
23 July	(United States) OPS 4324 KH-4B 1111		Low Earth	Reconnaissance	In orbit	Successful
23 July	(United States) Delta M		(United States) Cape Canaveral LC-17A			
23 July	(United Nations) Intelsat III F8	Intelsat	Geosynchronous	Communication	In orbit	Successful
28 July	(Soviet Union) R-36-0		(Soviet Union) Site 191/66, Baikonur			
28 July	(Soviet Union) Kosmos 354 (OGCh #22)		Low Earth Orbit	Weapon System Test	In orbit	Successful
=== August ===
7 August	(Soviet Union) Kosmos 2		(Soviet Union) Kapustin Yar			
7 August	(United Nations) Interkosmos 3 (DS-U2-IK #1)	Interkosmos	Low Earth Orbit	Science	In orbit	Successful
7 August	(Soviet Union) Voskhod		(Soviet Union) Site 43/4, Plesetsk			
7 August	(Soviet Union) Kosmos 355 (Zenit-4 #76)	GRU	Low Earth Orbit	Reconnaissance	In orbit	Successful
10 August	(Soviet Union) Kosmos 2		(Soviet Union) Plesetsk Site 133/1			
10 August	(Soviet Union) Kosmos 356 (DS-U2-MG #2)	Yuzhnoye	Low Earth Orbit	Research	In orbit	Successful
17 August	(Soviet Union) Molniya-M / MVL		(Soviet Union) Site 31/6, Baikonur			
17 August	(Soviet Union) Venera 7		Heliocentric to Venus orbit	Venus lander	In orbit	Successful
18 August	(United States) Titan IIIB Agena-D		(United States) Vandenberg SLC-4W			
18 August	(United States) OPS 7874 KH-8 4328	USAF	Low Earth	Reconnaissance	In orbit	Successful
19 August	(United States) Delta M		(United States) Cape Canaveral LC-17A			
19 August	(United Kingdom) Skynet 1B	Ministry of Defence	Geosynchronous	Military Communication	In orbit	Successful
19 August	(Soviet Union) Kosmos 2		(Soviet Union) Plesetsk Site 133/1			
19 August	(Soviet Union) Kosmos 357 (DS-P1-Yu #35)	Yuzhnoye	Low Earth Orbit	Radar calibration	In orbit	Successful
20 August	(Soviet Union) Kosmos-3M		(Soviet Union) Plesetsk			
20 August	(Soviet Union) Kosmos 358 (DS-P1-M #1)		Low Earth Orbit	Weapon System Test	In orbit	Successful
22 August	(Soviet Union) Molniya-M / MVL		(Soviet Union) Site 31/6, Baikonur			
22 August	(Soviet Union) Kosmos 359 (Venera 8a)		Heliocentric to Venus orbit	Venus lander	In orbit	Failure
26 August	(United States) Thorad-SLV2G Agena-D		(United States) Vandenberg SLC-1W			
26 August	(United States) OPS 8329 Strawman 3	USAF	Low Earth	Reconnaissance	In orbit	Successful
27 August	(United States) Scout A		(United States) Vandenberg			
27 August	(United States) Transit 19	US Navy		Navigation	In orbit	Successful
29 August	(Soviet Union) Voskhod		(Soviet Union) Site 31/6, Baikonur			
29 August	(Soviet Union) Kosmos 360 (Zenit-4M #5, Rotor #5)	GRU	Low Earth Orbit	Reconnaissance	In orbit	Successful
=== September ===
2 September; 00:34	(United Kingdom) Black Arrow	R2	(Australia) Woomera LA-5B		(United Kingdom) RAE	
2 September; 00:34	(United Kingdom) Orba (X 2)	RAE	Suborbital	Atmospheric density research	2 September	Failure
2 September; 00:34	First orbital launch attempt of Black Arrow. Second stage shut down 13 seconds earlier than intended.					
12 September; 13:25	(Soviet Union) Proton-K/D		(Soviet Union) Baikonur 81/23		(Soviet Union)	
12 September; 13:25	Luna 16		Selenocentric	Lunar lander	24 September	Successful
12 September; 13:25	First uncrewed lunar sample return, first Soviet lunar sample return					
25 September; 05:00	(Japan) M-4S		(Japan) Kagoshima LP-M			
25 September; 05:00	(Japan) MS-F1	ISAS	Low Earth	Solar, cosmic ray and ionosphere research	25 September	Failure
25 September; 05:00	First flight of M-4S. Fourth stage failed to ignite					
=== October ===
20 October; 19:55	(Soviet Union) Proton-K/D		(Soviet Union) Baikonur 81/23		(Soviet Union)	
20 October; 19:55	Zond 8		Highly elliptical	Spacecraft test	In orbit	Successful
20 October; 19:55	Final circumlunar flight of the Zond program.					
=== November ===
24 November 1970; 11:00	(Soviet Union) Soyuz-L		(Soviet Union) Baikonur Site 31/6		(Soviet Union)	
24 November 1970; 11:00	(Soviet Union) Kosmos 379 (T2K No.1)		Low Earth	Uncrewed test flight of LK lunar lander	21 September 1983	Successful
=== December ===
12 December; 10:54	(United States) Scout B		(Italy) San Marco mobile range, Kenya		(Italy) CNR	
12 December; 10:54	(United States) Explorer 42 (Uhuru)	NASA	Low Earth	X-ray astronomy	5 April 1979	Successful
12 December; 10:54	First satellite dedicated to X-ray astronomy.					

- ← Jan
- Feb
- Mar
- Apr
- May
- Jun
- Jul
- Aug
- Sep
- Oct
- Nov
- Dec →

== Suborbital Launches ==
This is a list of spaceflights launched in 1970.

Date and time (UTC)	Rocket	Flight number	Launch site		LSP	
Date and time (UTC)	Payload	Operator	Orbit	Function	Decay (UTC)	Outcome
Date and time (UTC)	Remarks					
=== January-March ===
4 March; 21:15	(United Kingdom) Black Arrow	R1	(Australia) Woomera LA-5B		(United Kingdom) RAE	
4 March; 21:15		RAE	Suborbital	Test flight	4 March	Successful
4 March; 21:15	Test flight with inert third stage. Apogee: 550 km					
=== April-June ===
16 April; 06:38	(Australia) Cockatoo		(Australia) Woomera LA-2 HAD		(Australia) WRE	
16 April; 06:38	(Australia) WRE Cockatoo 101 (Sphere)	WRE	Suborbital	Aeronomy	16 April	Successful
=== July-September ===
31 July; 02:00	(Soviet Union) K63D		(Soviet Union) Vladimirovka test range, near Kapustin Yar			
31 July; 02:00	(Soviet Union) BOR-2 No.102		Suborbital	Re-entry test for Spiral program	31 July	Successful
31 July; 02:00	Subscale model of the Spiral spaceplane. Apogee: 100 km					
=== October-December ===
1 October; 13:46:12	(United States) Nike Apache		(Brazil) Barreira do Inferno		(Germany) MORABA	
1 October; 13:46:12	(Germany) DLR N-NA-30	DLR	Suborbital	Ionospheric research	1 October	Successful
31 October; 10:32	(United States) Aerobee 170		(United States) White Sands Missile Range		(United States) NASA	
31 October; 10:32	(United States) UVT-SDGS 3	NASA	Suborbital	UV astronomy	31 October	Successful

== Launches from the Moon ==
Date and time (UTC)	Rocket	Flight number	Launch site		LSP	
Date and time (UTC)	Payload (⚀ = CubeSat)	Operator	Orbit	Function	Decay (UTC)	Outcome
Date and time (UTC)	Remarks					
21 September; 7:43	(Soviet Union) Luna 16 Ascent stage		Mare Fecunditatis (Luna)			
21 September; 7:43	(Soviet Union) Luna 16 Return capsule	(Soviet Union)	Highly elliptical	Sample return	24 September 1970	Successful
21 September; 7:43	First uncrewed lunar sample return mission					

== Deep Space Rendezvous ==
Date (GMT)	Spacecraft	Event	Remarks
11 April 1970	Apollo 13 S-IVB stage	Impacted the Moon	
15 April	Apollo 13	Lunar flyby at 254 kilometres (158 mi)	Intended lunar landing, forced to abort and return to Earth using lunar free return trajectory
20 September	Luna 16	100gm from Mare Fecunditatis	First sample return mission
24 October	Zond 8	Circumlunar flight of the Moon 1,110 kilometres (690 mi)	
17 November	Luna 17	Delivered Lunokhod 1 at Mare Imbrium	First robotic Lunar rover
15 December	Venera 7	Atmospheric probe worked for 23 min on the Venerian surface	First soft landing on another planet
