= Sputnik 12 =

Sputnik 12 may refer to:

- Vostok 2 – the second spacecraft in the U.S.S.R.'s crewed flight series
- Cosmos 2 – the second satellite in the Soviet Earth Satellite series
