= Kosmos 3 (satellite) =

Soviet research satellite

- Mission type: Geophysics; Technology
- Harvard designation: 1962 Nu 1
- COSPAR ID: 1962-013A
- SATCAT no.: 00281
- Mission duration: 176 days

Spacecraft properties
- Bus: 2MS
- Manufacturer: OKB-1
- Launch mass: 330 kg

Start of mission
- Launch date: 24 April 1962, 04:04:00 GMT
- Rocket: Kosmos-2I 63S1
- Launch site: Kapustin Yar, Mayak-2
- Contractor: Yuzhnoye

End of mission
- Decay date: 17 October 1962

Orbital parameters
- Reference system: Geocentric
- Regime: Low Earth
- Perigee altitude: 216 km
- Apogee altitude: 707 km
- Inclination: 49.0°
- Period: 93.8 minutes
- Epoch: 24 April 1962

Kosmos 3 (Russian: Космос 3 meaning Cosmos 3), also known as 2MS No.1 and occasionally in the West as Sputnik 13 was a scientific research and technology demonstration satellite launched by the Soviet Union in 1962.

== Spacecraft ==
It was the third satellite to be designated under the Kosmos system, and the first spacecraft to be launched as part of the 2MS programme. Its primary missions were to develop systems for future satellites, and to record data about cosmic rays and radiation.

Kosmos 3, an automatic geophysical station, was one of a series of Soviet Earth satellites whose purpose was to study outer space, the upper layers of the atmosphere, and the Earth. Scientific data and measurements were relayed to Earth by multichannel telemetry systems equipped with space-borne memory units. It had a mass of 330 kg.

== Mission ==
It was launched aboard Kosmos-2I 63S1 s/n 4LK. It was the fifth flight of the Kosmos-2I, and the third to successfully reach orbit. The launch was conducted from Mayak-2 at Kapustin Yar, and occurred at 04:04:00 GMT on 24 April 1962. Kosmos 3 was placed into a low Earth orbit with a perigee of 216 kilometres (134 mi), an apogee of 707 kilometres (439 mi), an inclination of 49.0°, and an orbital period of 93.8 minutes. It decayed on 17 October 1962.

Kosmos 3 was a 2MS satellite, the first of two to be launched. The second, 2MS No.2, would be launched as Kosmos 5 on 28 May 1962. The 2MS was the second of two types of MS satellite to be launched, following the first 1MS spacecraft which had been launched as Kosmos 2.

== See also ==
- 1962 in spaceflight
