= Kosmos 5 =

Soviet research satellite

- Mission type: Technology; Geophysics
- Harvard designation: 1962 Upsilon 1
- COSPAR ID: 1962-020A
- SATCAT no.: 00297
- Mission duration: 339 days

Spacecraft properties
- Bus: 2MS
- Manufacturer: OKB-1
- Launch mass: 280 kg

Start of mission
- Launch date: 28 May 1962, 03:07 GMT
- Rocket: Kosmos-2I 63S1
- Launch site: Kapustin Yar, Mayak-2
- Contractor: Yuzhnoye

End of mission
- Last contact: 9 July 1962
- Decay date: 2 May 1963

Orbital parameters
- Reference system: Geocentric
- Regime: Low Earth
- Perigee altitude: 190 km
- Apogee altitude: 1587 km
- Inclination: 49.1°
- Period: 102.8 minutes
- Epoch: 28 May 1962

Kosmos 5 (Russian: Космос 5 meaning Cosmos 5), also known as 2MS #2 and occasionally in the West as Sputnik 15, was a scientific research and technology demonstration satellite launched by the Soviet Union in 1962. It was the fifth satellite to be designated under the Kosmos system, and the third spacecraft to be launched as part of the MS programme, after Kosmos 2 and Kosmos 3. Its primary missions were to develop systems for future satellites, and to record data about artificial radiation around the Earth.

== Spacecraft ==
Kosmos 5 was a 2MS satellite, the second of two to be launched, following the first which was launched as Kosmos 3 on 24 April 1962. The 2MS was the second of two types of MS satellite to be launched, following the first 1MS spacecraft which had been launched as Kosmos 2. Kosmos 5 was the penultimate MS satellite to be launched, and the last to successfully reach orbit. The last launch attempt, of a 1MS satellite, occurred on 25 October 1962, and failed to reach orbit. It had a mass of 280 kg.

== Mission ==
It was launched aboard Kosmos-2I 63S1 s/n 3LK. It was the sixth flight of the Kosmos-2I, and the fourth to successfully reach orbit. The launch was conducted from Mayak-2 at Kapustin Yar, and occurred at 03:07:00 GMT on 28 May 1962. Kosmos 5 was placed into a low Earth orbit with a perigee of 190 kilometres (120 mi), an apogee of 1,587 kilometres (986 mi), an inclination of 49.1°, and an orbital period of 102.8 minutes. It decayed on 2 May 1963, after nearly a year in orbit.

Kosmos 5 was among several satellites inadvertently damaged or destroyed by the Starfish Prime high-altitude nuclear test on 9 July 1962 and subsequent radiation belt.

== See also ==
- 1962 in spaceflight
