= Soviet crewed lunar programs =

Programs by the Soviet Union to land humans on the Moon

The Soviet crewed lunar programs were a series of programs pursued by the Soviet Union to land humans on the Moon, in competition with the United States Apollo program. The Soviet government publicly denied participating in such a competition, but secretly pursued two programs in the 1960s: crewed lunar flyby missions using Soyuz 7K-L1 (Zond) spacecraft launched with the Proton-K rocket, and a crewed lunar landing using Soyuz 7K-LOK and LK spacecraft launched with the N1 rocket. Following the dual American successes of the first crewed lunar orbit on 24–25 December 1968 (Apollo 8) and the first Moon landing on July 20, 1969 (Apollo 11), and a series of catastrophic N1 failures, both Soviet programs were eventually brought to an end. The Proton-based Zond program was canceled in 1970, and the N1-L3 program was de facto terminated in 1974 and officially canceled in 1976. Details of both Soviet programs were kept secret until 1990 when the government allowed them to be published under the policy of glasnost.

Soviet cosmonauts neither orbited nor landed on the Moon.

== Early concepts ==
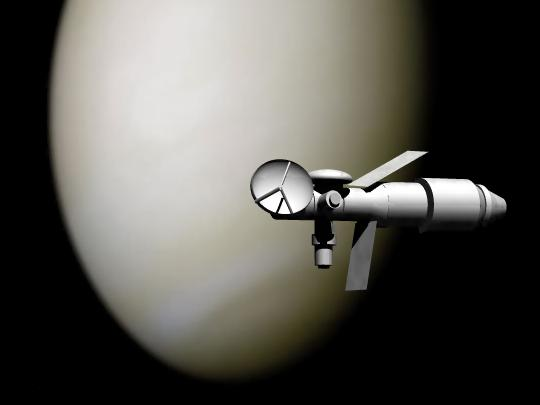
Artist's depiction of TMK-MAVR on a Venus flyby

As early as 1961, the Soviet leadership had made public pronouncements about landing a man on the Moon and establishing a lunar base; however, serious plans were not made until several years later. Sergei Korolev, the senior Soviet rocket engineer, was more interested in launching a heavy orbital station and in crewed flights to Mars and Venus. With this in mind, Korolev began the development of the super-heavy N-1 rocket with a 75-ton payload.

=== Soyuz-A-B-C and N1 ===
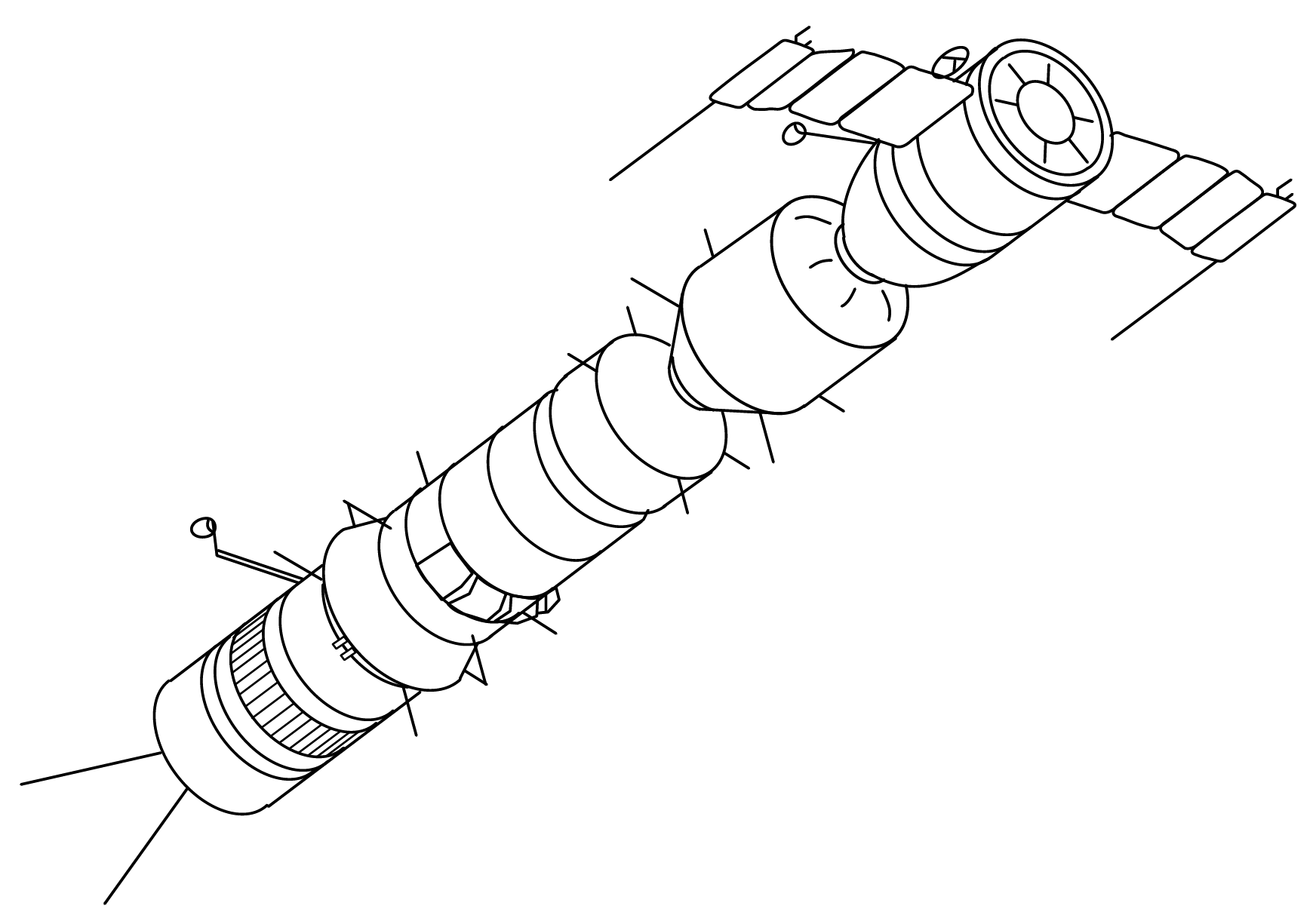
Soyuz 7K-9K-11K circumlunar concept. The drawing shows Soyuz 7K (right), Soyuz-B/Soyuz 9K booster, and Soyuz-V/Soyuz 11K tanker with twin whip antennas (left)

In its preliminary Moon plans, Korolev's design bureau initially promoted the Soyuz A-B-C circumlunar complex (A-B-V in Russian) concept under which a two-person spacecraft would dock with other components in Earth orbit to assemble a lunar flyby excursion vehicle. The components would then be delivered by the proven middle-sized R-7 rocket. While developing the N1, since 1963, Korolev began to plan a Moon landing mission using three launches and docking. Later Korolev managed to increase the payload of the N1 to 92-93 tons (by lightening some components, adjusting the parking orbit, and increasing the number of engines in its first stage from 24 to 30), providing enough power to accomplish the mission with a single launch. There were also other improvements planned to improve the N1 for later missions, primarily by switching to liquid hydrogen in the upper stage(s).

=== UR-500K / LK-1 and UR-700 / LK-3 ===
Another main space design bureau, headed by Vladimir Chelomei, proposed a competing cislunar orbiting mission using a heavy UR-500K rocket (later renamed the Proton rocket) and a two-crew LK-1 spacecraft. Later, Chelomei also proposed a Moon landing program with a super-heavy UR-700 rocket, an LK-700 lunar lander, and an LK-3 spacecraft.

=== R-56 ===
The R-56 which was developed between April 1962 and June 1964 was considered for involvement with the lunar program.

== Reaction to Apollo ==
In the early stage of the Soviet and US crewed lunar programs, U.S. President John F. Kennedy proposed before the United Nations a joint Moon program, a proposal which was considered by Nikita Khrushchev. The proposal disappeared with Kennedy's assassination two months later, but nevertheless foreshadowed the Apollo-Soyuz mission, which enabled subsequently the Shuttle-Mir program and the ISS.

The Soviet government issued a response to the American Apollo challenge after three years. According to the first government decree about the Soviet crewed Moon programs (Decree 655-268, ' On Work on the Exploration of the Moon and Mastery of Space '), adopted in August 1964, Chelomei was instructed to develop a Moon flyby program with a projected first flight by the end of 1966, and Korolev was instructed to develop the Moon landing program with a first flight by the end of 1967.

Following the change in Soviet leadership from Khrushchev to Leonid Brezhnev in 1964, the Soviet government in September 1965 assigned the flyby program to Korolev, who redesigned the cislunar mission to use his own Soyuz 7K-L1 spacecraft and Chelomei's Proton rocket.

Korolev organized full-scale development of both programs, but died after surgery in January 1966. According to a government decree of February 1967, the first crewed flyby was scheduled for mid-1967, and the first crewed landing for the end of 1968.

=== Moon flyby UR-500K(Proton)/L1(Zond) program ===
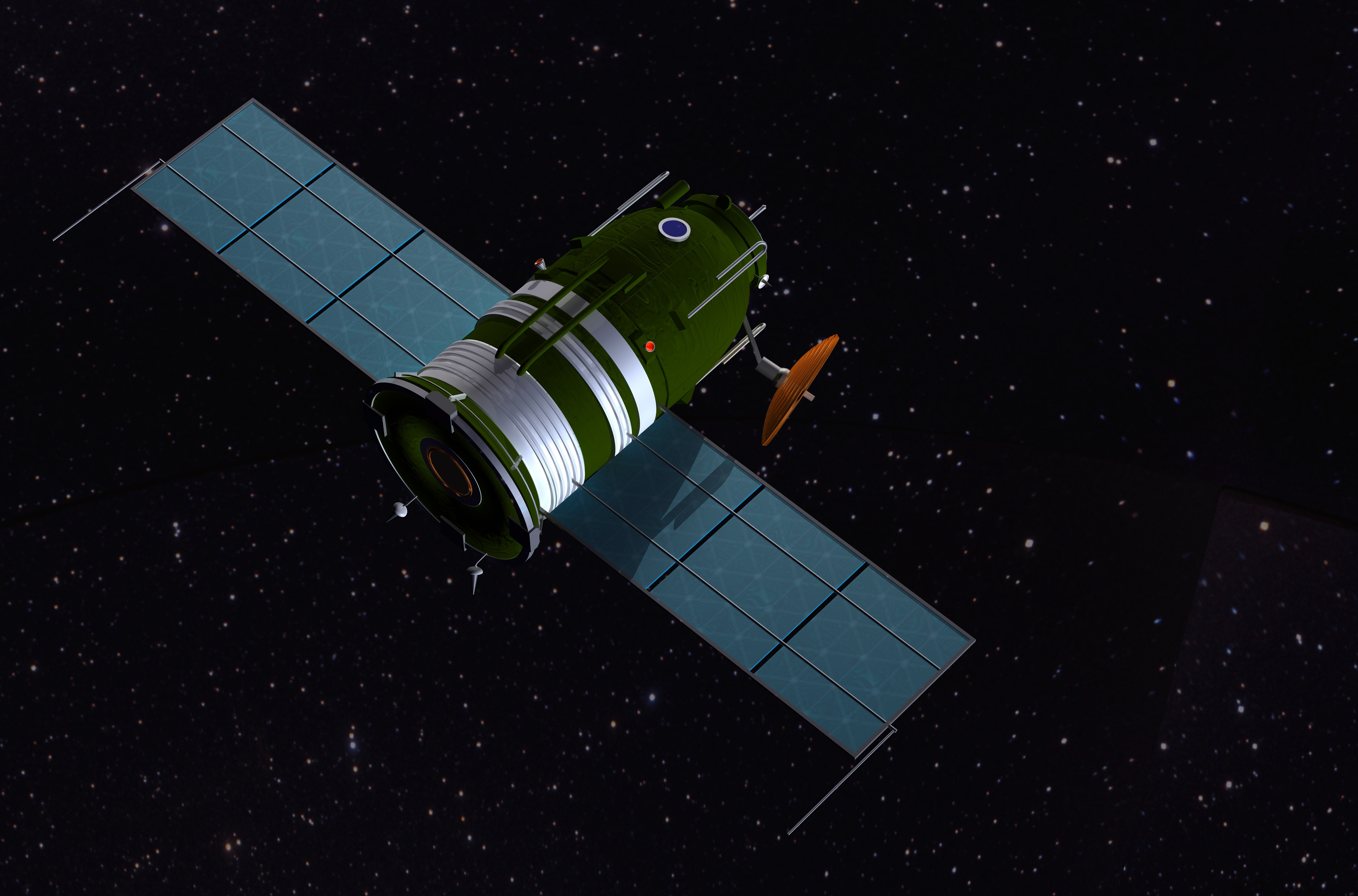
Zond (Soyuz 7K-L1) circumlunar spacecraft

Launched by a 3-staged Proton rocket, the L1 (Zond) was a spacecraft from the Soyuz family and consisted of two or three modified modules of the main craft Soyuz 7K-OK with a total weight of 5.5 tons. The Apollo orbital spacecraft (command ship) for the lunar flyby also had two modules (command and service) but was five times heavier, carried a crew of three and entered lunar orbit, whereas the L1 (Zond) performed a flight around the Moon and came back on a return trajectory. In September 1968 Zond 5 carried the first Earth lifeforms, including two tortoises, to travel around the Moon and return safely. Planned for 8 December 1968 for priority over the US, a first crewed mission of the L1 (Zond) was canceled due to the insufficient readiness of the capsule and rocket. After Apollo 8 won the first (lunar orbit) phase of the Moon Race at the end of 1968, the Soviet leadership lost political interest in the L1 (Zond) program. A few reserve units of L1 (Zond) made unpiloted flights, but by the end of 1970, this program was canceled.

=== Moon landing N1/L3 program ===
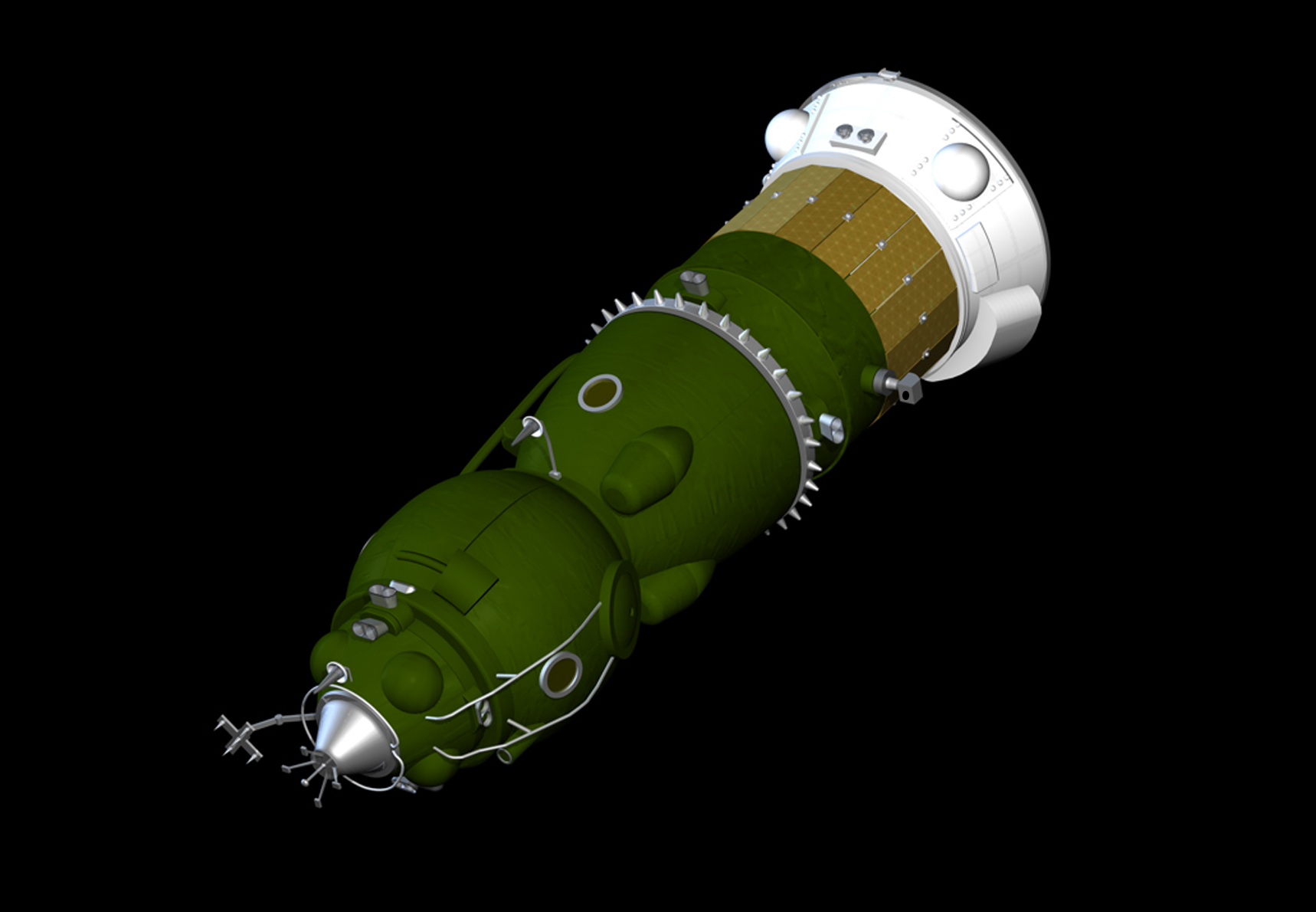
Soyuz 7K-LOK rendering

LK (Lunniy korabl – "lunar craft" or lunar ship)

The crewed landing plan adopted a similar method to the single launch and lunar orbit rendezvous of the Apollo project.

For mission safety, weeks before the crewed mission, an LK-R uncrewed L3 complex and two Lunokhod automated rovers would be sent to the Moon, to work as radio beacons for crewed LK, with the LK-R used as a reserve escape craft. The Lunokhods were also equipped with manual controls for the cosmonauts, both for transfer to LK-R in necessity and for regular research.

The N1 rocket would then carry the L3 Moon expedition complex, with two spacecraft (LOK and LK) and two (Block G and Block D) boosters. A variant of the Soyuz craft, the "Lunniy Orbitalny Korabl" (LOK) command module, would carry two men, with three modules like the regular Soyuz 7K-OK, but was heavier by a few tons. The 7K-OK was half the mass of the three-crew Apollo orbital command ship. The "Lunniy Korabl" (LK) accommodated only one cosmonaut, so in the Soviet plan, only one cosmonaut would land on the Moon. The mass of the LK was 40% of the mass of the Apollo lunar lander.

The L3 complex to be placed in LEO by the N1 was 93 tons (compared to Saturn V's 137 tons). The mass of the LOK and LK was 40% of the Apollo complex, but was equivalent to the L3 complex without Block G.

The booster for the LEO toward the Moon for the Apollo vehicle was provided by the last stage of the Saturn V, while for the Block D, LOK and LK, this was to be provided by Block G of the same L3 complex.

During the L3 complex's journey to the Moon, the cosmonaut would transfer between the LOK and LK by a 'spacewalk'. On the Apollo missions, the transfer was done using an internal passage called the docking tunnel.

Block D was to slow the LOK and LK into lunar orbit, while with Apollo this phase was undertaken by firing the engine on the service module to slow the complex and enter lunar orbit since the Apollo complex traveled with the Command Module and Lunar Excursion Module (LEM) facing back towards the Earth.

Once in orbit, the LK with Block D would separate from the LOK and descend toward the surface of the Moon using the Block D engine. After Block D exhausted its fuel, the LK was to separate and complete landing using its own Blok E engine.

On the Moon, the cosmonaut would take Moon walks, use Lunokhods, collect rocks, and plant the Soviet flag.

After a few hours on the lunar surface, the LK's engine would fire again using its landing structure as a launch pad, as with Apollo. To save weight, the engine used for landing would blast the LK back to lunar orbit for an automated docking with the LOK. The cosmonaut then would spacewalk back to the LOK carrying rock samples.

The LK would then be cast off, after which the LOK would fire its rocket for the return to Earth.

=== Launch schedules ===
As of 1967, the L1/L3 launch schedules were:

UR-500K(Proton)/L1(Zond) program

2P: Develop Block D stage (February or March 1967)
3P: Develop Block D stage (March 1967)
4L: Uncrewed lunar flyby (May 1967)
5L: Uncrewed lunar flyby (June 1967)
6L: Crewed lunar flyby (June or July 1967)
7L: Crewed lunar flybys (August 1967)
8L: Crewed lunar flybys (August 1967)
9L: Crewed lunar flybys (September 1967)
10L: Crewed lunar flybys (September 1967)
11L: Crewed lunar flybys (October 1967)
12L: Crewed lunar flybys (October 1967)
13L: Reserve spacecraft

N1/L3 program

N-1/L3 lunar mission profile

3L: Develop LV & Blocks G&D (September 1967)
4L: Reserve
5L: LOK/LK uncrewed (December 1967)
6L: LOK/LK uncrewed (February 1968)
7L: Crewed LOK/uncrewed LK (April 1968)
8L: Crewed LOK/uncrewed LK (June 1968)
9L: Crewed LOK/uncrewed LK with LK lunar landing (August 1968)
10L: First crewed lunar landing (September 1968)
11L: Reserve
12L: Reserve

Korolev's death in 1966, along with various technical and administrative reasons, as well as a lack of financial support, resulted in both programs being delayed.

=== Cosmonauts ===
In 1966, two cosmonaut training groups were formed. One group was commanded by Vladimir Komarov and included Yuri Gagarin, and was to prepare for qualification flights of the Soyuz in Earth orbit and a Proton-launched cis-lunar mission (Gagarin, Nikolayev, Komarov, Bykovsky, Khrunov; Engineer-Cosmonauts: Gorbatko, Grechko, Sevastyanov, Kubasov, Volkov). Komarov later died in the Soyuz 1 spaceflight when his parachute malfunctioned causing his capsule to smash into the earth at high speed. The second group was led by Alexei Leonov and concentrated on the landing mission (Commanders: Leonov, Popovich, Belyayev, Volynov, Klimuk; Engineer-cosmonauts: Makarov, Voronov, Rukavishnikov, Artyukhin). As a result, Leonov has the strongest claim to have been the Soviets' first choice for the first man on the Moon.

After Komarov's death in Soyuz 1 in 1967, Gagarin was taken out of training and the groups were restructured. Despite the Soyuz 1 setback, the Soviets successfully rehearsed the automated docking of two uncrewed Soyuz craft in Earth orbit in 1968 and with the crewed Soyuz 4 and Soyuz 5 joint mission in early 1969 tested the other key mission elements.

A total of 18 missions were related to the N1-L3 project.

== Later developments ==
After the US Moon landing in 1969, the justification for the Soviet lunar landing program largely evaporated, although development and testing continued into the early 1970s. In 1970–1971 the LK was ready after three uncrewed test flights in LEO (Kosmos 379, Kosmos 398, Kosmos 434). The LOK launched once (Kosmos 382 7K-L1E, a dummy of 7K-LOK). The Krechet lunar spacesuit and support systems were tested.

Four N1 test launches in 1969 (twice), 1971, and 1972 were failures, despite improvements after each crash. The second launch, on 3 July 1969 (an attempt to upstage Apollo 11 by 13 days), resulted in the destruction of the rocket and the entire launch complex, which delayed the N1-L3 program for two years.

In an automatic Moon flyby, these first two launches of the N1 carried the 7K-L1S spacecraft (modified 7K-L1). The dummy 7K-LOK (7K-L1E) and regular 7K-LOK with dummy LKs were used in the third and fourth launches.

The complete L3 lunar expedition complex with the 7K-LOK and LK for the Moon flyby and landing was prepared for a fifth launch, using a modified N1 rocket in August 1974. If this mission and the next had been successful, it would have led to the decision to launch up to five Soviet crewed N1-L3 expeditions in 1976–1980. To gain technical and scientific interest in the program, the modified multi-launched N1F-L3M missions were planned to have significantly more time on the Moon's surface than Apollo.

However, N1-L3 (as well as N1F-L3M) program was canceled in May 1974, and Soviet crewed space efforts subsequently concentrated on the development of space stations and on several designs and ground preparatory processes for a Mars mission, which continues to the present day, but has unclear objectives.

A Moon base, Zvezda, that was proposed later, developed mockups of expedition vehicles and surface modules, and "Vulkan-LEK" project were not adopted for economic reasons. As some recompense and as a replacement for the crewed landing program, the Soviets fulfilled a program of automated delivery of lunar soil and Lunokhod automated Moon rovers.

The launch pad and MIK of N1 were redesigned for the Energia-Buran shuttle program. Five LKs and three LOKs remain, at least, with some kept in the designer's and producer's company museums. Nearly 150 engines produced for first stages of N1F were kept by the manufacturer (Kuznetsov Design Bureau), then sold for use on other launchers beginning around 2000.

== Gallery ==
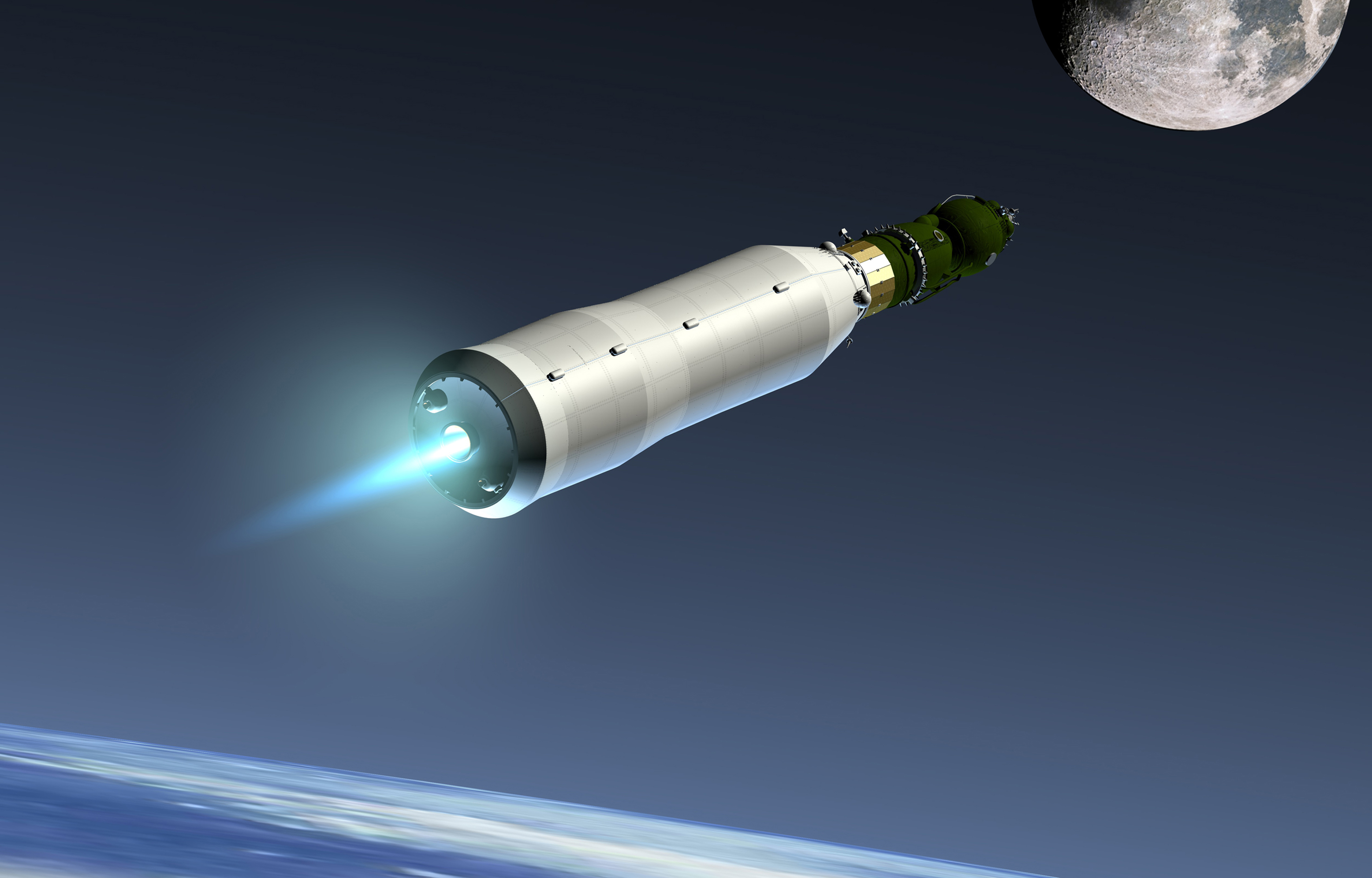
LOK (Soyuz 7K-L3)

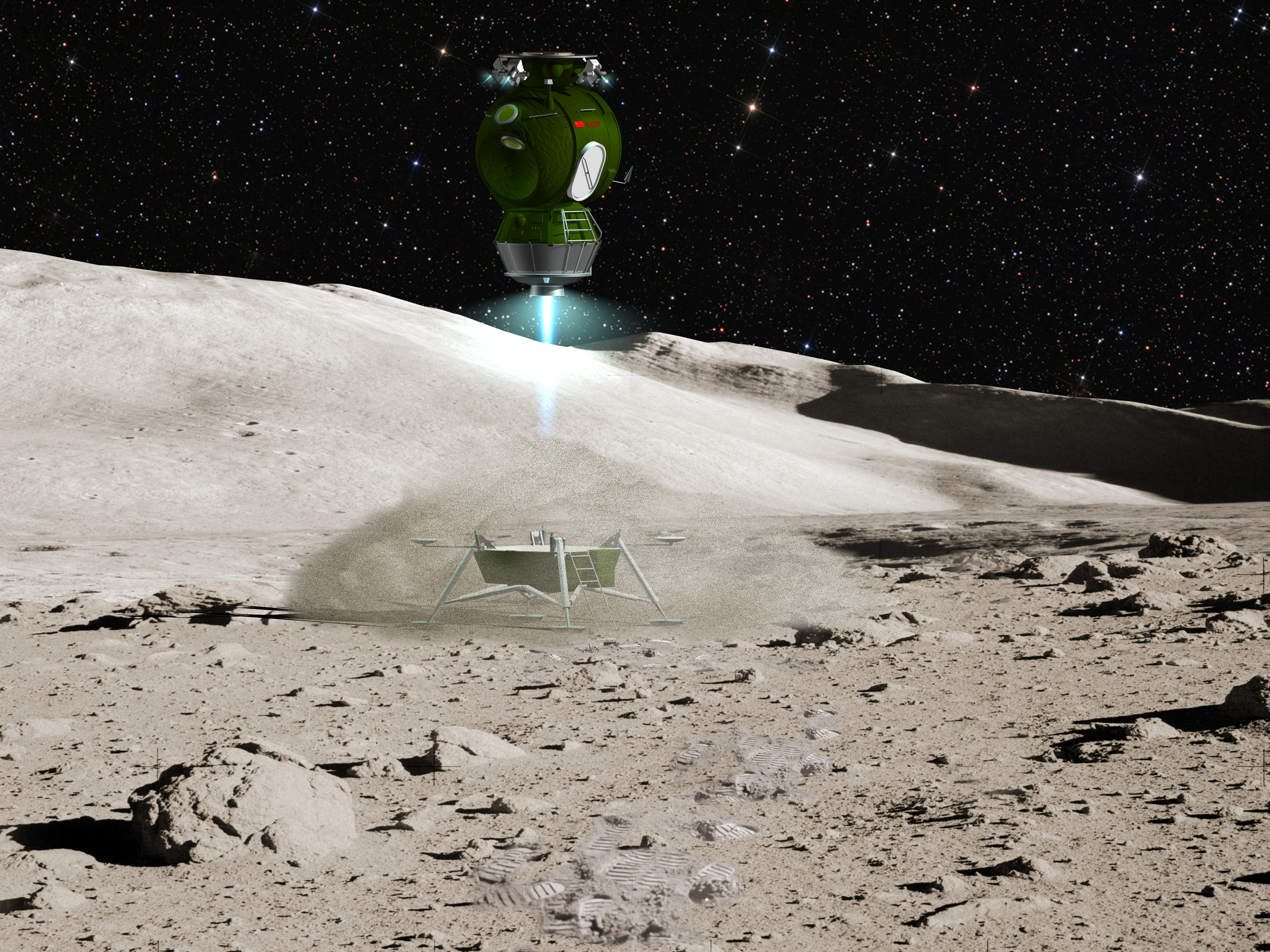
LK Lander - Lunniy Korabl ascent from Moon

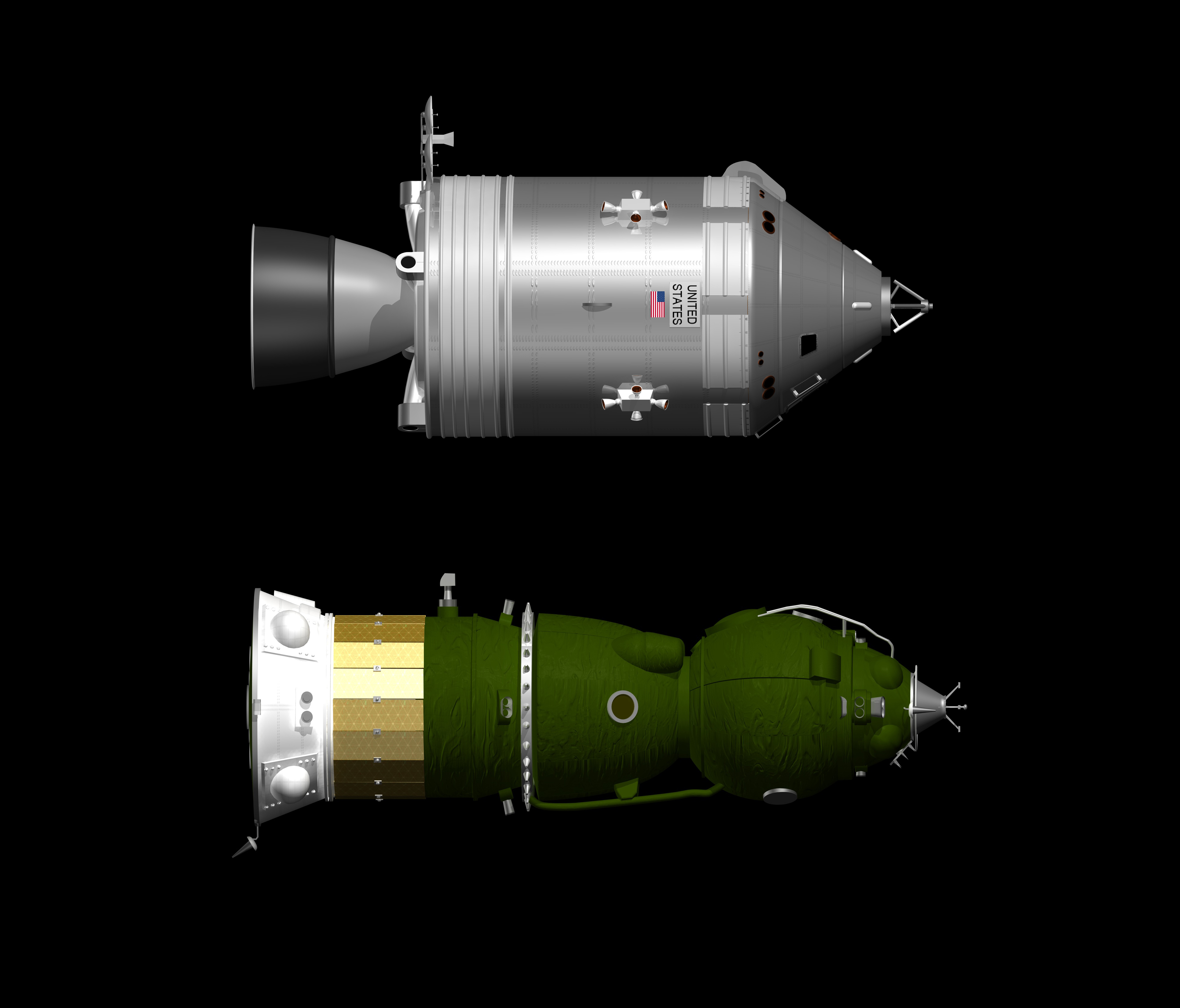
Apollo CSM and LOK (Soyuz 7K-L3) (drawn to scale). Command ships for the Moon voyage

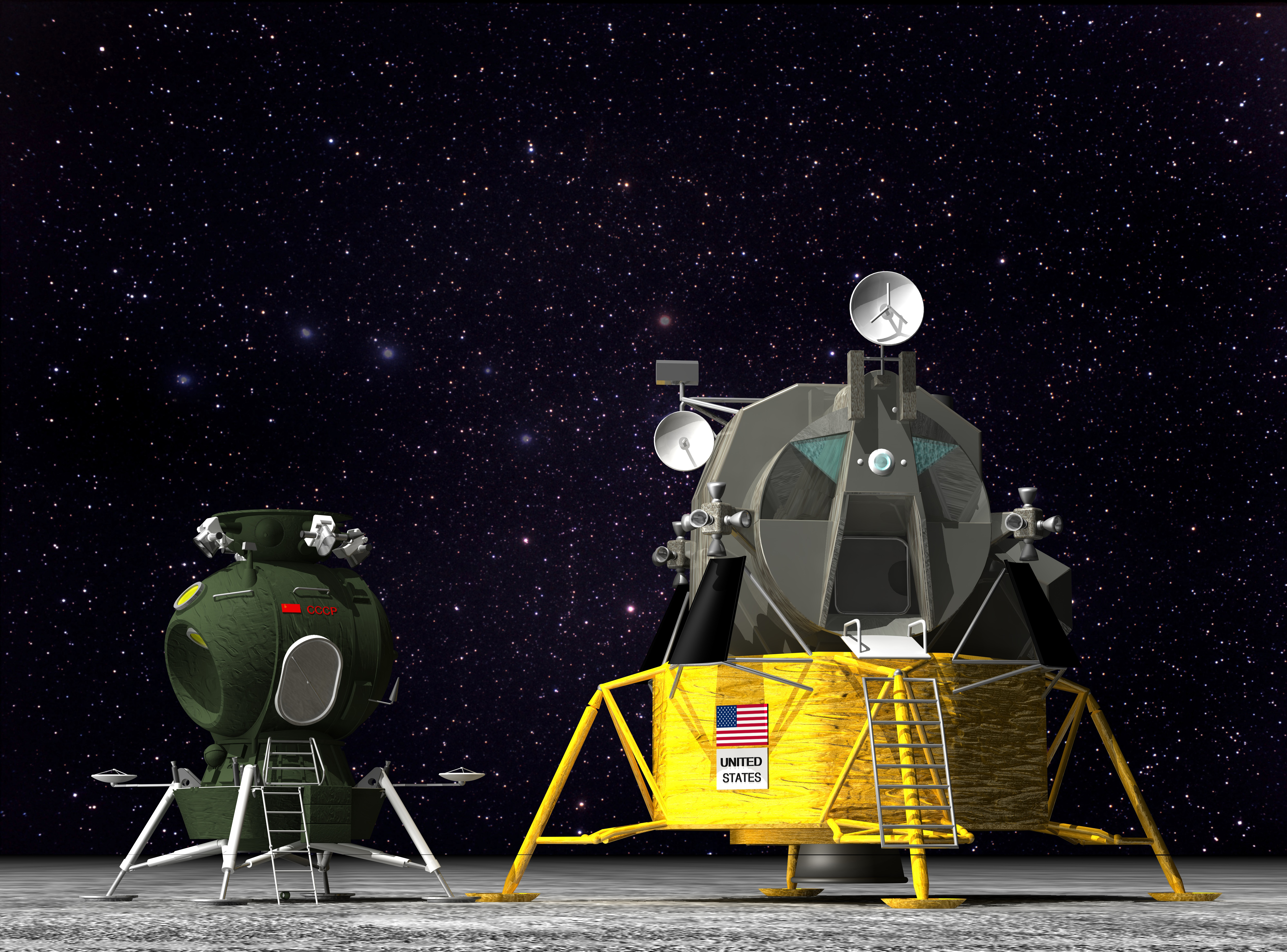
LK Lander and Apollo LM (drawn to scale). crewed Moon landers

== See also ==
- Apollo program
- Moon exploration
- First on the Moon - a 2005 Russian mockumentary
- Soviet space program
- For All Mankind - American science fiction drama based on the alternative history premise of the Soviet Union successfully reaching the moon prior to the United States
