= MS (satellite) =

MS was a series of four Soviet satellites launched in 1962. Two different types of satellite, 1MS and 2MS were used, with two satellites of each type being launched. Three of the satellites were operated successfully, however one of the 1MS satellites was lost in a launch failure. The three that reached orbit received Kosmos designations.

MS satellites were developed by OKB-1, and used for technology demonstration and development. They also carried payloads to investigate radiation and cosmic rays.

== Launch history ==
MS (satellites)
Name	Type	S/N	Launch	Decay	Remarks
Kosmos 2	1MS	#1	6 April 1962 17:15	20 August 1963	
Kosmos 3	2MS	#1	24 April 1962 04:00	17 October 1962	
Kosmos 5	2MS	#2	28 May 1962 03:00	2 May 1963	
N/A	1MS	#2	25 October 1962	25 October 1962	Failed to orbit

== See also ==
- 1962 in spaceflight
- Dnepropetrovsk Sputnik
- List of Kosmos satellites (1–250)
