= Kosmos 382 =

1970 Soviet test spaceflight

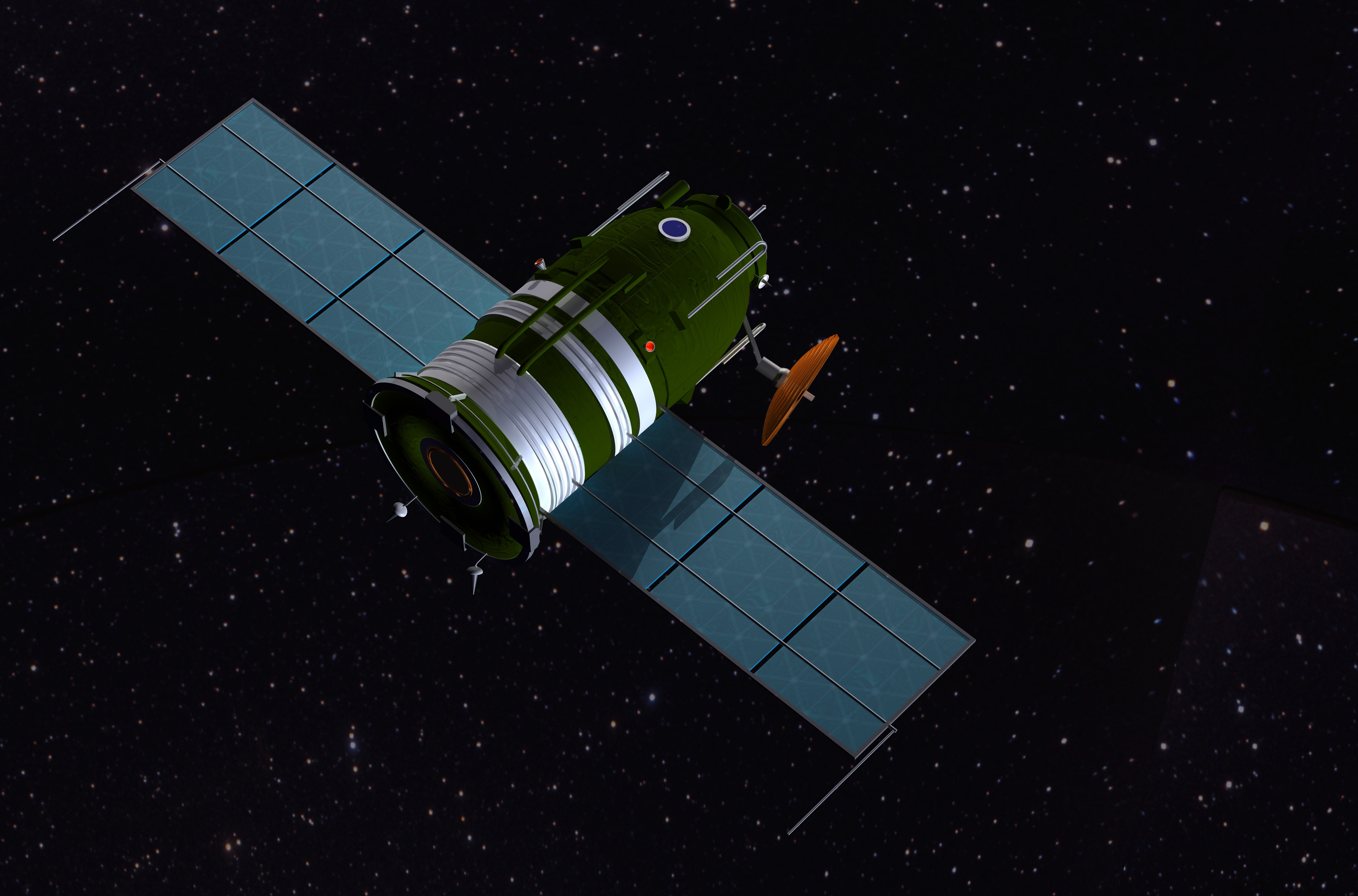
- Soyuz 7K-L1E
- Mission type: Orbital test flight
- Operator: Soviet space program
- COSPAR ID: 1970-103A
- SATCAT no.: 4786
- Mission duration: 54 years, 6 months, 27 days (in orbit)

Spacecraft properties
- Spacecraft type: Soyuz 7K-L1E

Start of mission
- Launch date: December 2, 1970, 17:00 UTC
- Rocket: Proton-K/D
- Launch site: Baikonur 81/23

End of mission
- Disposal: Decommissioned
- Last contact: December 7, 1970

Orbital parameters
- Reference system: Geocentric orbit
- Regime: Low Earth Orbit
- Perigee altitude: 2,577 km (1,601 mi)
- Apogee altitude: 5,082 km (3,158 mi)
- Inclination: 55.87°

Kosmos 382 was a Soviet Soyuz 7K-L1E modification of a Soyuz 7K-L1 "Zond" spacecraft and was successfully test launched into Low Earth Orbit on a Proton rocket designated as (Soyuz 7K-L1E No.2) on December 2, 1970.

The main purpose of the mission was to test the N1/L3 spacecraft's Block D lunar orbit insertion/descent stage by simulating the lunar orbit insertion burn, the lunar orbit circularization burn and the final lunar descent burn. Over the course of five days, the Block D stage was ignited three times to raise the initial ~190 km × ~300 km × 51.6° orbit to a final 2577 km × 5082 km × 55.87° orbit. The Block D stage was fitted with cameras in the tanks to monitor the fuel and oxidizer behaviour in weightlessness and during acceleration. Kosmos-382 also carried other experiments, including a prototype environmental control subsystem named "Rosa" for producing potable water from atmospheric condensate exhaled by cosmonauts onboard Soviet crewed spacecraft. This system was later used on the Salyut space stations in the 1970s and 1980s.

The following maneuvers were performed:

- 190 km x 300 km orbit to 303 km x 5038 km orbit (delta-V=982 meters/second;
- 318 km x 5040 km orbit to 1616 km x 5071 km orbit (deltaV= 285 m/s);
- 1616 km x 5071 km orbit to 2577 km x 5082 km orbit (deltaV= 1311 m/s).

== See also ==
- 1970 in spaceflight
- Zond program
