= Intelsat III F-7 =

Communications satellite

- Mission type: Communications
- Operator: Intelsat
- COSPAR ID: 1970-032A
- SATCAT no.: 04376
- Mission duration: 5 years (planned)

Spacecraft properties
- Manufacturer: TRW Inc.
- Launch mass: 647 kilograms (1,426 lb)
- BOL mass: 151 kilograms (333 lb)
- Power: 183 W

Start of mission
- Launch date: April 23, 1970, 00:46:12 UTC
- Rocket: Thor Delta M 559/D78
- Launch site: Cape Canaveral LC-17A

Orbital parameters
- Reference system: Geocentric
- Regime: Geostationary
- Longitude: 124° W (current position)
- Semi-major axis: 42,146 kilometers (26,188 mi)
- Perigee altitude: 35,760.4 kilometers (22,220.5 mi)
- Apogee altitude: 35,789.9 kilometers (22,238.8 mi)
- Inclination: 4.9°
- Period: 1,435.1 minutes
- Epoch: May 29, 2018

Intelsat III F-7 was an American communications satellite owned by Intelsat. The satellite had an estimated useful life of 5 years.

== Design ==
The seventh of eight Intelsat III satellites to be launched, Intelsat III F-7 was built by TRW. It was a 647-kilogram (1,426 lb) spacecraft equipped with two transponders to be powered by body-mounted solar cells generating 183 watts of power. It had a design life of five years and carried an SVM-2 apogee motor for propulsion.

== Launch ==
Intelsat III F-7 was launched by a Delta M rocket, flying from Launch Complex 17A at the Cape Canaveral Air Force Station.

== See also ==
- 1970 in spaceflight
