= Kosmos 379 =

First uncrewed test flight of the Soviet lunar module

- LK lander
- Mission type: Spacecraft test
- Operator: Soviet space program
- COSPAR ID: 1970-099A
- SATCAT no.: 4760
- Mission duration: 12 years, 9 months and 28 days

Spacecraft properties
- Spacecraft type: T2K No.1
- Manufacturer: OKB-1
- Launch mass: 7,495 kilograms (16,524 lb)

Start of mission
- Launch date: 24 November 1970, 11:00:00 UTC
- Rocket: Soyuz-L
- Launch site: Baikonur 31/6

End of mission
- Decay date: 21 September 1983

Orbital parameters
- Reference system: Geocentric
- Regime: Low Earth
- Eccentricity: 0.004161
- Perigee altitude: 198 kilometres (123 mi)
- Apogee altitude: 253 kilometres (157 mi)
- Inclination: 51.6 degrees
- Period: 88.7 min

Kosmos 379 (Russian: Космос 379 meaning "Cosmos 379"), also known as T2K No.1, was an uncrewed test of the LK (the Soviet counterpart of the Apollo Lunar Module) in Earth orbit.

== Mission ==
Earth orbit simulated propulsion system operations of a nominal lunar landing mission. Kosmos 379 entered a 192 to 232 km low Earth orbit. After three days it fired its motor to simulate hover and touchdown on the moon, in imitation of a descent to the lunar surface after separation of the Blok D lunar crasher propulsion module. The engine firing changed its orbit from 192 km × 233 km to 196 km × 1206 km (delta-V = 263 m/s).

After a simulated stay on the Moon, it increased its speed by 1.518 km/s, simulating ascent to lunar orbit making the final apogee 14,035 km. These main maneuvers were followed by a series of small adjustments simulating rendezvous and docking with the Soyuz 7K-L3. The LK lander tested out without major problems and decayed from orbit on September 21, 1983.

== Parameters ==
- Spacecraft: T2K
- Mass: 5500 kg
- Crew: None
- Launched: November 24, 1970
- Landed: Reentered September 21, 1983
- Orbit: 192 km
