= Blok E =

- Manufacturer: Yuzhnoye Design Bureau
- Country of origin: Soviet Union
- Used on: LK

General characteristics
- Height: 2.38 m (7.8 ft)
- Diameter: 1.72 m (5.6 ft)
- Gross mass: 2,950 kg (6,500 lb)
- Propellant mass: 2,390 kg (5,270 lb)
- Empty mass: 525 kg (1,157 lb)

Launch history
- Status: Retired
- Total launches: 0^{a}
- Successes (stage only): 0
- Failed: 0

Blok E
- Powered by: 11D410 engine cluster Consisting of: 1x 11D411; 1x 11D412; 4x Vernier Thrusters
- Maximum thrust: 20.1 kN (4,500 lbf) (11D411 at 100% Thrust or 11D412); 8.4 kN (1,900 lbf) (11D411 at minimum Throttle)
- Specific impulse: 315 s (3.09 km/s) (11D411); 285 s (2.79 km/s) (11D411 at minimum Thrust); 312 s (3.06 km/s) (11D412)
- Burn time: 400 seconds Full Thrust +100 seconds throttled (11D411); 400 seconds (11D412)
- Propellant: UDMH/N2O4

Blok E (or Block E) is the propulsion unit of Soviet lunar module LK, developed in the 1960s by Yuzhnoye Design Bureau as a part of the human lunar landing program.

Blok E was designed to soft land the LK on the surface of the Moon after orbital velocity was cancelled by Blok D. Later the same stage would fire for the second time for the liftoff and ascent from the Moon to rendezvous with the orbiting Soyuz 7K-LOK. Blok E used RD-858 (or 11D411), which has one nozzle and is deeply throttleable (from 2050 kg to 858 kg of thrust), as the primary engine. The backup engine was RD-859 (or 11D412), which has two nozzles.

Together, the two engines formed the propulsion system designated 11D410. Both engines burned a mix of unsymmetrical dimethyl hydrazine and nitrogen tetroxide. The hypergolic propellant components guaranteed their easy storage during a lunar expedition lasting at least 11 or 12 days.

The engines were equipped with clam-shell doors to prevent damaging it while staying on the surface of the Moon. There were four additional vernier engines placed between main and backup engine nozzles. Additionally to the main engine, the backup engine and the verniers, the stage was equipped with eight low-thrust reaction control thrusters feeding off a common propellant reserve. These thrusters had been provided by OKB-300, the Stepanov Aviation Bureau.

11D410
Image Credit: Dzodzaev Arsen
	RD-858 / 11D411	RD-859 / 11D412
Designed	1964	
Propellant	N2O4/UDMH	
Mixture Ratio	2.03 at 100% Thrust; 1.6 fully throttled	1.6
Engine cycles	Open Gas-generator cycle	
Pumps	1	
Combustion chambers	1	2
Restarts	2	
Dry mass	53 kg (117 lb)	57 kg (126 lb)
TWR	38.68 (Full thrust)	35.88
Mass flow	6.5–3.0 kg/s (14.3–6.6 lb/s) depending on throttle	6.6 kg/s (15 lb/s)

== See also ==
- N-1 – original launch vehicle for which this stage was developed

== Notes ==
a. Blok E was part of the N1-L3 lunar expeditionary complex, which was supposed to be launched on the rocket with the same name. As the N1 did not finish development, only dummy stages were launched on the third and fourth launch (serial 6L and 7L).
