= Soyuz 7K-LOK =

Concept for a lunar spacecraft derived from Soyuz

- Lunniy Orbitalny Korabl drawing
- Manufacturer: OKB-1
- Designer: Sergei Korolev
- Country of origin: Soviet Union
- Operator: Soviet space program
- Applications: Crewed cislunar flight and lunar orbit

Specifications
- Launch mass: 9,850 kilograms (21,720 lb)
- Crew capacity: 2
- Dimensions: 10.06 meters (33.0 ft) length 2.93 meters (9.6 ft) diameter
- Regime: Low Earth orbit Cislunar space Lunar orbit

Production
- Status: Canceled
- Built: 6
- Launched: 5
- Failed: 4
- Maiden launch: December 2, 1970
- Last launch: November 23, 1972

Related spacecraft
- Derived from: Soyuz 7K-OK
- Derivatives: Soyuz 7K-L1 lunar flyby Soyuz 7K-OKS space station shuttle
- Flown with: LK lander

Apollo CSM and LOK drawn to scale

The Soyuz 7K-LOK, or simply LOK (Russian: Лунный Орбитальный Корабль, romanized: Lunniy Orbitalny Korabl meaning "Lunar Orbital Craft") was a Soviet crewed spacecraft designed to take humans from Earth to orbit the Moon, developed in parallel to the 7K-L1. The LOK would carry two cosmonauts, acting as a mother ship for the LK lander which would land one crew member to the surface. It was part of the N1-L3 programme which also included the LK lander and the N1 rocket.

== Design ==
Like the 7K-OK model, the 7K-LOK was divided into three sections, an ellipsoid Orbital Module, the "headlight"-shaped Descent Module, and a cylindrical equipment module. Like the 7K-OK, the 7K-LOK was capable of physically docking with another spacecraft, but lacked the transfer tunnel used on the Apollo (spacecraft), thus forcing the cosmonaut to make a spacewalk from the 7K-LOK's orbital module to the LK Lander using the new Krechet space suit (the predecessor to the Orlan space suits used today on the International Space Station).

Another change to the 7K-LOK was the elimination of the solar panels used on the 7K-OK, replacing them with fuel cells similar to those found on the Apollo CSM. Additionally, a "cupola" located on the Orbital Module, allowed the cosmonaut in the 7K-LOK to perform the docking procedure with the LK Lander after lunar liftoff. Only the Descent Module from the 7K-L1, with a thicker, reinforced heatshield, is used on the 7K-LOK and like the 7K-L1, is capable of doing a "skip reentry" so that the Soyuz could be recovered in the Soviet Union.

The information display systems (IDS) on the LOK were different from those of the Soyuz-7K. The Descent Module was equipped with the "Uran" control panel and the Orbital Module featured the "Orion" approach control panel.

== Flights ==
Only three uncrewed 7K-LOKs were flown in the short lifespan of the failed Soviet lunar program.

- One of them was a dummy 7K-LOK as a Soyuz 7K-L1E modification of a Soyuz 7K-L1 "Zond" spacecraft and was successfully test launched into Low Earth orbit on a Proton rocket designated as Kosmos 382 (Soyuz 7K-L1E No.2) on December 2, 1970.
- Two other unsuccessful launches of dummy 7K-LOK (Soyuz 7K-L1E No.1) and operational (Soyuz 7K-LOK No.1) with dummy LKs were fulfilled atop the N-1 rocket in its later flights on June 26, 1971, and November 23, 1972, intended for lunar flybys. Both spacecraft were pulled and saved by the launch escape system when those boosters failed. The two aborted flights later proved that the launch-escape system worked when a similar problem on a Soyuz-U forced the Soyuz T-10a to be jettisoned with its cosmonaut crew in 1983 before the booster exploded on the launchpad, destroying it. On two early flights of the N-1, both of them failures, another Soyuz 7K-L1S "Zond-M" modification of the 7K-L1 spacecraft instead of the 7K-LOK or 7K-L1E were used without the dummy LK, and they, along with the booster, were destroyed.
- Subsequently, a complete L3 lunar expedition complex with an operational 7K-LOK and LK, LOK 2, for an uncrewed lunar flyby and landing mission (in preparation of a future crewed flight) was prepared for the fifth launch of a modified N1 rocket in August 1974. The N1-L3 program was cancelled in May 1974 and the Soviets decided to concentrate on the development of space stations, achieving several firsts in the process.
