= Soyuz-L =

Soviet expendable carrier rocket

Soyuz-L (11A511L)
- Function: Medium-lift launch vehicle
- Manufacturer: OKB-1
- Country of origin: Soviet Union

Size
- Height: 50 m (160 ft)
- Diameter: 10.3 m (34 ft)
- Mass: 300,000 kg (660,000 lb)
- Stages: 3

Capacity

Payload to LEO
- Mass: 5,500 kg (12,100 lb)

Associated rockets
- Family: R-7

Launch history
- Status: Retired
- Launch sites: Baikonur, Site 31/6
- Total launches: 3
- Success(es): 3
- First flight: 24 November 1970
- Last flight: 12 August 1971
- Carries passengers or cargo: LK

Boosters (First stage) – Block B, V, G & D (Note: This is a transliteration of the second through fifth letters of the Cyrillic alphabet (Б, В, Г, Д). A sense-for-sense translation would correspond to the second through fifth letters of the Latin alphabet, 'Block B, C, D & E'.)
- No. boosters: 4
- Powered by: 1 × RD-107-8D728
- Maximum thrust: 995 kN (224,000 lb_{f})
- Total thrust: 3,980 kN (890,000 lb_{f})
- Specific impulse: 314 s (3.08 km/s)
- Burn time: 119 seconds
- Propellant: LOX / RP-1

Second stage (core) – Block A
- Powered by: 1 × RD-108-8D727
- Maximum thrust: 977 kN (220,000 lb_{f})
- Specific impulse: 315 s (3.09 km/s)
- Burn time: 291 seconds
- Propellant: LOX / RP-1

Third stage
- Powered by: 1 × RD-0110
- Maximum thrust: 294 kN (66,000 lb_{f})
- Specific impulse: 330 s (3.2 km/s)
- Burn time: 246 seconds
- Propellant: LOX / RP-1

The Soyuz-L (Russian: Союз, lit. 'union', GRAU index: 11A511L) was a Soviet expendable carrier rocket designed by OKB-1 and manufactured by State Aviation Plant No. 1 in Samara, Russia. It was created to test the LK lunar lander in low Earth orbit, as part of the Soviet lunar programme.

The Soyuz-L was a derivative of the original Soyuz rocket featuring the reinforced first stage and boosters supporting the Molniya-M's third stage, so that it could carry a more massive payload. A larger payload fairing was also fitted, to accommodate the LK spacecraft. The Soyuz-L was only launched three times between 1970 and 1971, all successful. The later Soyuz-U used a similar configuration to the Soyuz-L.
