= LK (spacecraft) =

Soviet lunar module intended to be used in the Soviet lunar landing attempts

- T2K variant of the spacecraft for Earth orbit tests during processing
- Manufacturer: OKB-586
- Designer: Mikhail Yangel
- Country of origin: Soviet Union
- Operator: Soviet space program
- Applications: Crewed lunar landing

Specifications
- Spacecraft type: Lunar module
- Launch mass: 5,560 to 6,525 kg
- Crew capacity: 1 (2 on later variant)
- Dimensions: 5.20 to 5.8 m high 4.50 m wide overall, landing gear deployed
- Volume: 5 m^{3}
- Power: N_{2}O_{4}/UDMH
- Batteries: Equipped
- Regime: Lunar orbit
- Design life: 48 hours

Production
- Status: Canceled
- Built: Several
- Launched: 3 (T2K)
- Failed: 0
- Lost: 0
- Maiden launch: 24 Nov 1970; Kosmos 379 (T2K)
- Last launch: 12 Aug 1971; Kosmos 434 (T2K)
- Last retirement

Blok E (Lunar descent/ascent)
- Powered by: 11D410
- Maximum thrust: 20 kN (4,500 lbf)
- Specific impulse: 315 s (3.09 km/s)
- Propellant: UDMH/N2O4

Configuration
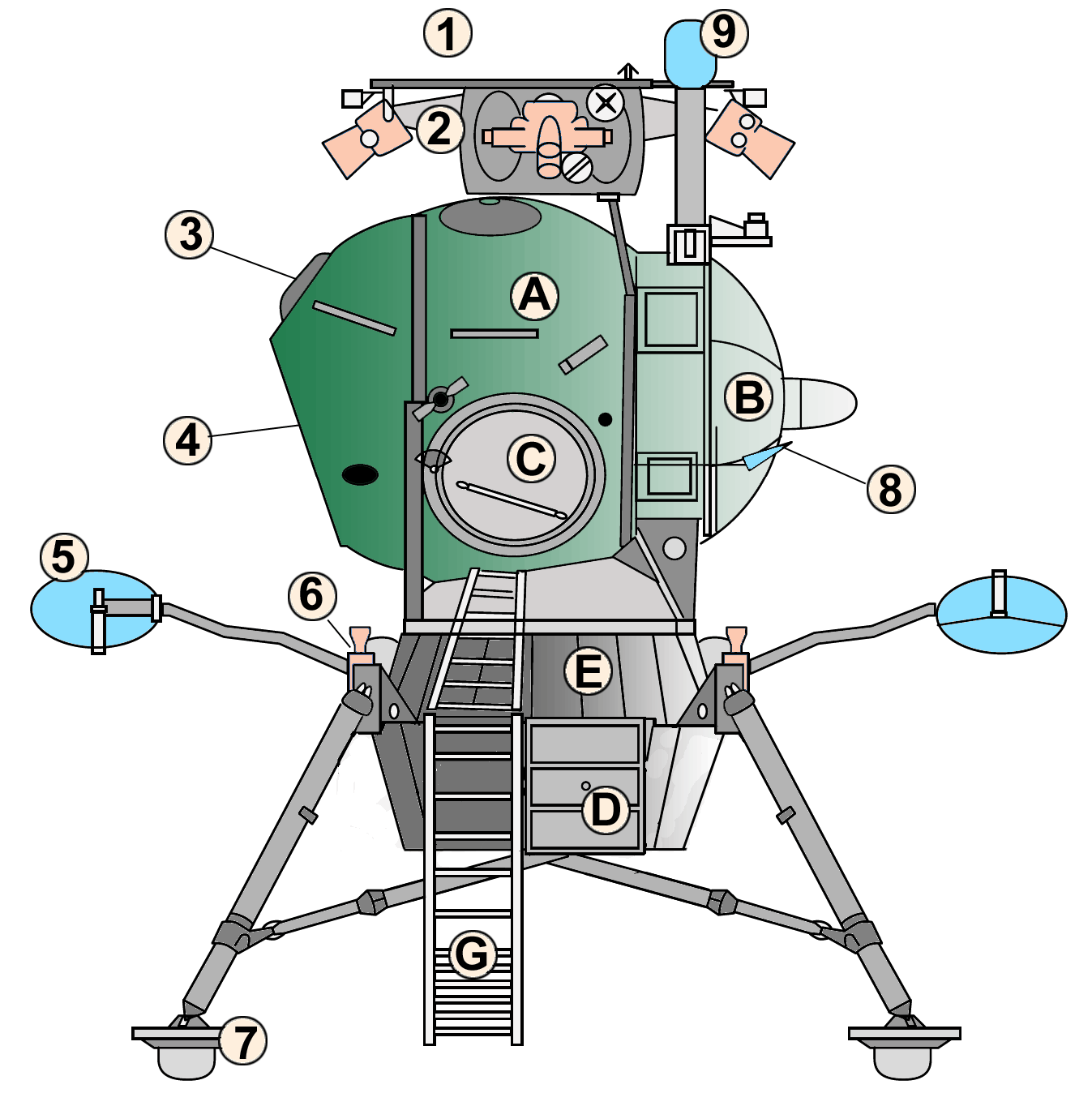
- LK components: 1) passive plate of the docking system, 2) attitude control nozzles, 3) orbital rendezvous window, 4) landing window (in a concave recess), 5) high-gain antennas, 6) solid-fuel "nesting" engines, 7) footpads, 8) omnidirectional antenna, 9) rendezvous radar, A) pressurized compartment, B) equipment compartment, C) hatch, D) batteries, E) engine and fuel tanks, G) ladder

The LK (Russian: ЛК, from Russian: Лунный корабль, romanized: Lunniy korabyl, lit. 'lunar craft'; GRAU index: 11F94) is a lunar module (lunar lander designed for human spaceflight) developed in the 1960s as a part of several Soviet crewed lunar programs. Its role was analogous to the American Apollo Lunar Module (LM). Three LK modules, of the T2K variant, were flown without crew in Earth orbit, but no LK ever reached the Moon. The development of the N1 launch vehicle required for the lunar flight suffered setbacks (including several launch failures), and the first Moon landings were achieved by US astronauts on Apollo 11. As a result, both the N1 and the LK programs were cancelled without any further development.

== The N1-L3 flight plan ==
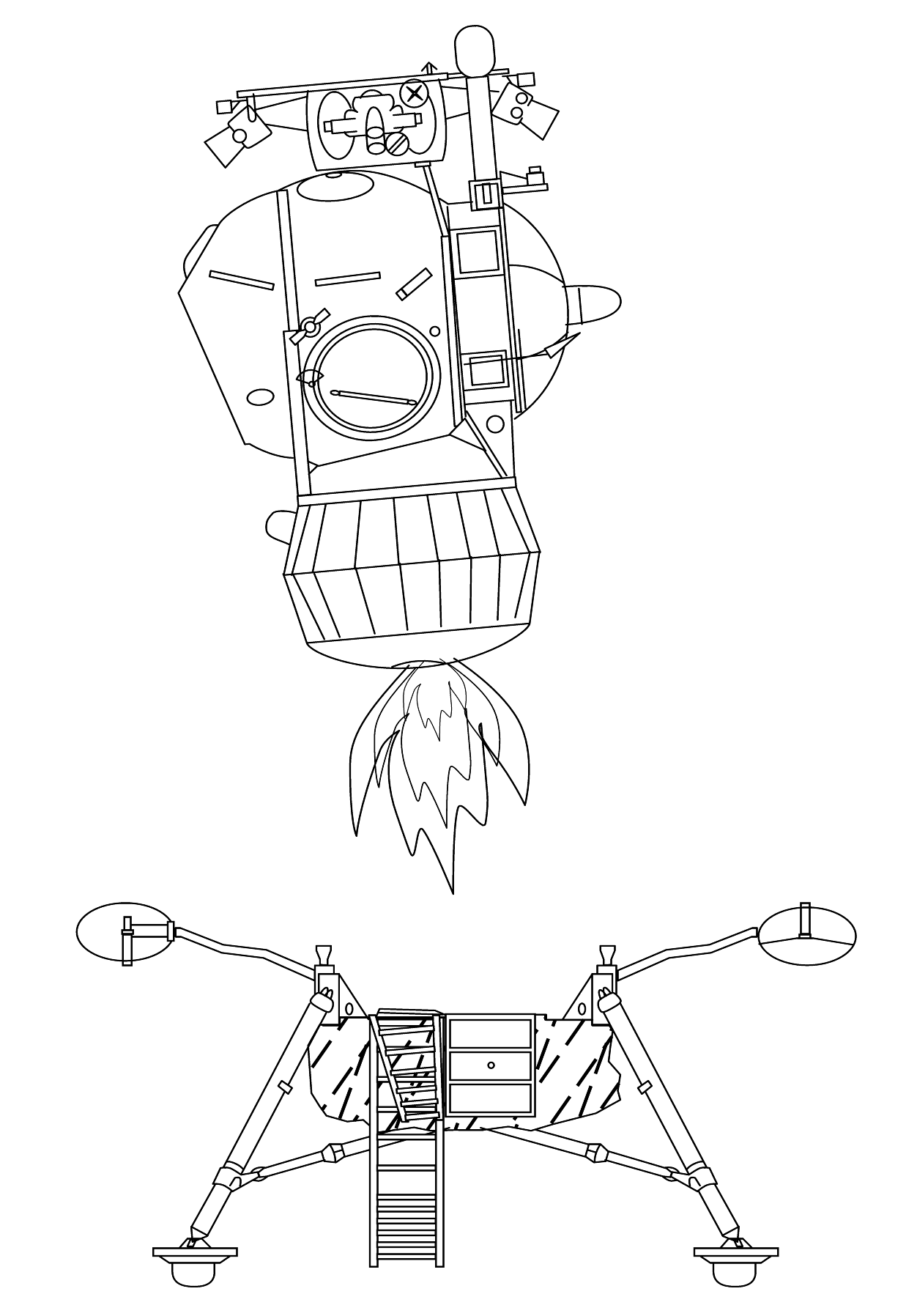
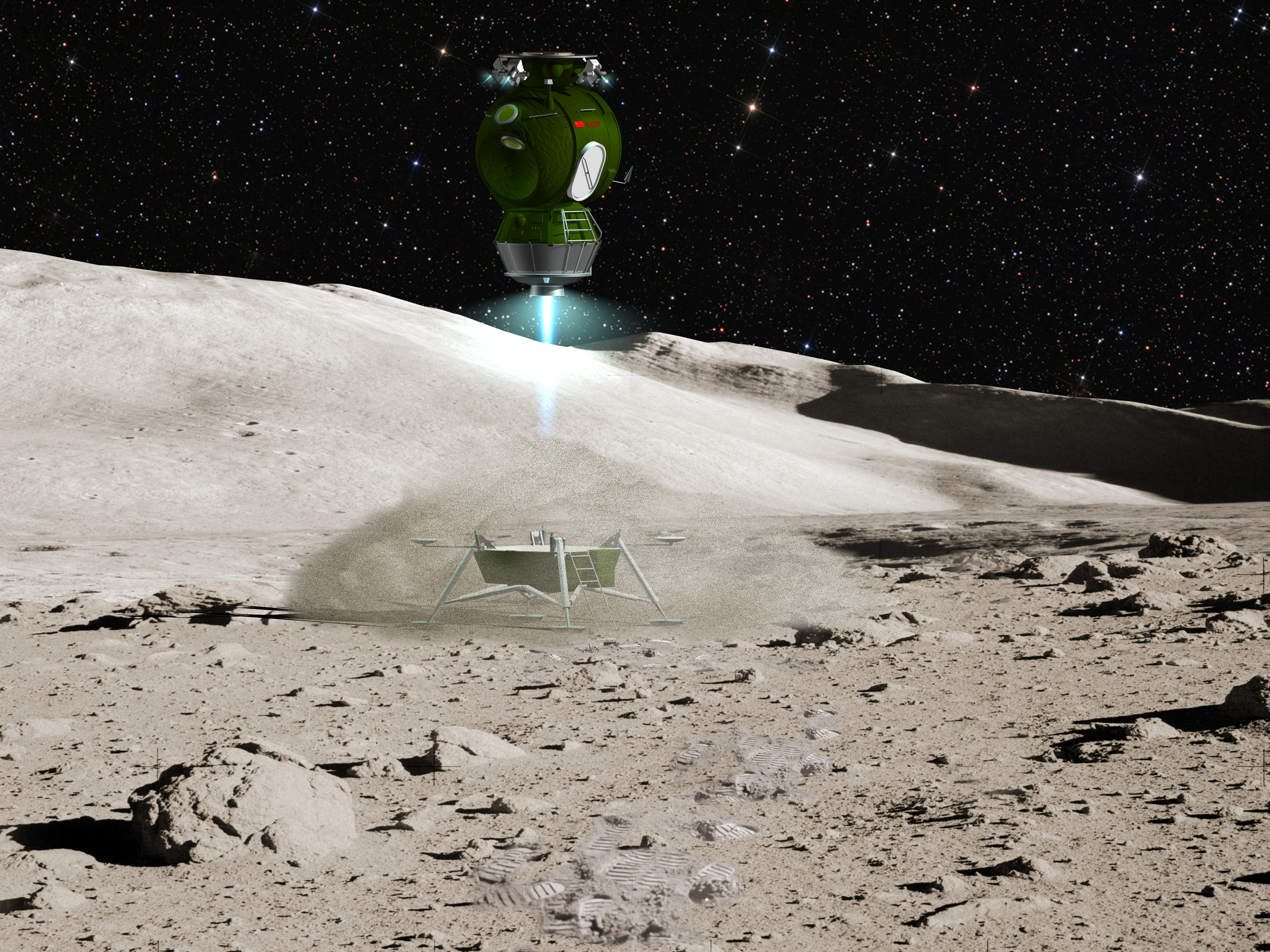
A drawing and a CGI image of the LVA during takeoff

Sergei Korolev, the lead Soviet rocket engineer and spacecraft designer during the 1950s and 1960s, planned to adopt the same lunar orbit rendezvous concept seen in the Apollo programme. The lunar expedition spacecraft L3 was to consist of a Soyuz 7K-L3 Command Ship (a variant of the Soyuz) and an LK Lander. L3 would carry a two-man crew atop a single three-stage superheavy N-1 booster. A fourth stage, the Blok G, would push the L3 (LOK+LK) toward the Moon, with the Blok D as a fifth stage.

=== Lunar orbit ===
The Blok D engine would also slow the L3 into lunar orbit. Following the coast to the Moon, one cosmonaut would spacewalk from the LOK (Soyuz 7K-L3) to the LK (Lunniy Korabl) lander and enter it. He would then separate the Blok D stage and the LK from the LOK before dropping toward the Moon using the Blok D engine. Once slowed from orbital velocity and placed on a trajectory to the vicinity of the landing site by the Blok D, the LK would separate from the Blok D and continue the descent and landing using its Blok E stage on the LK for terminal deceleration and landing.

=== Lunar landing ===
An earlier uncrewed probe of the Luna programme, a Lunokhod, would be used to select a suitable area and then act as a beacon for the LK. A backup LK would then be launched to the landing site. The third step would see a crewed LK landing with a single cosmonaut.

Although the specifics on planned activity while on the lunar surface remain vague, the small size and limited payload capacity of the N-1/Soyuz LOK/LK compared to the Saturn/Apollo meant that not much in the way of scientific experiments could have been performed. Most likely, the cosmonaut would plant the Soviet flag on the Moon, collect soil samples, take photographs, and deploy a few small scientific packages.

=== Earth return ===
After a day on the lunar surface the LK's engine would fire again, using its landing leg structure as a launch pad. To save weight, the engine used for landing would also blast the LK back to lunar orbit for an automated docking with the LOK, using the Soyuz Kontakt docking system. The cosmonaut would then spacewalk back to the LOK carrying the Moon rock samples, and the LK would then be cast off. After this, the LOK would fire its rocket for the return to Earth. The LK's docking port was a latticework of 96 hexagon-shaped holes arranged in an isometric grid, each as a potential docking port for the snare-shaped probe of the LOK to fit in without precise alignment of the two craft. Due to weight restrictions, the docking interface was designed to be as simple as possible, with a strictly mechanical interlock and no electrical or fluid connections. Docking and undocking were possible only a single time.

== Design ==
The LK spacecraft can be subdivided into the lunar landing aggregate ("Lunnyi Posadochnyi Agregat", "LPA") and the lunar ascent vehicle, ("Lunnyi Vzletnyi Apparat", "LVA'"). Propulsion, both for landing and lifting off the Moon was based on the Blok E propulsion system. The Information Display System (spacecraft control panels and controls) version was called Luch.

The four missions using an LK used the T2K variant, almost identical to the standard LK, but without landing gear.

=== Systems ===
The spacecraft included the following systems:

- Pressurized cosmonaut compartment;
- Flight control avionics;
- Life-support system;
- Attitude control systems;
- Lunar landing device, or LPU, with four landing legs;
- Power supply system, consisting of chemical batteries attached to LPU;

=== Instruments ===
The spacecraft included the following instruments:

- Planeta landing radar
- pressurized avionics container
- two communication antennas
- three batteries
- four containers with water for a vaporization unit
- robotic arm and drill

== Testing ==
The LK variant T2K was tested uncrewed in Earth orbit over three missions between 1970 and 1971. All three LKs were launched with the Soyuz-L rocket. The first flight imitated the planned working cycle of the Blok E stage. The second and third flights were intended to test the LK's behavior under several flight anomalies. All flights went well, and the LK was considered ready for crewed flight.

LK-T2K test flights
Mission	Launch date	Orbital decay	Orbit	Duration (in orbit)	Outcome
Kosmos 379 (T2K No.1)	24 November 1970; 11:00 UTC	21 September 1983	198 km x 253 km	12 years and 301 days	Success
Kosmos 398 (T2K No.2)	26 February 1971; 12:14 UTC	10 December 1995	196 km x 276 km	24 years and 287 days	Success
Kosmos 434 (T2K No.3)	12 August 1971; 09:30 UTC	23 August 1981	187 km x 11,777 km	10 years and 178 days	Success

== Cancellation ==
The success of the Apollo program in putting American astronauts on the Moon in 1969 meant that the United States won the Moon race, although plans were being drawn right up until the early 1970s. Four N1 launches were attempted including two later with dummy LKs but all were failures, despite engineering improvements after each failure. The second launch attempt on July 3, 1969, just 13 days before the launch of Apollo 11, was a catastrophic failure which destroyed both the rocket and the launch complex. Subsequently, the complete L3 lunar expedition complex with the regular LK and Soyuz 7K-LOK module-spacecraft for a Moon flyby and landing by a full uncrewed mission in a future crewed scenario was prepared for the fifth launch of modified N1 rocket in August 1974. The N1-L3 program was cancelled in May 1974 and the Soviets decided to concentrate on the development of space stations, achieving several firsts in the process.

In 2017, there was an anonymous claim that Chinese officials asked the Ukrainians to rebuild the original LK's propulsion module using modern materials such as new computer technology replacing obsolete electronics in the module's flight control system. According to the agreement, Ukrainians would transfer China the newly produced set of design documentation for the propulsion module, but the hardware itself would remain in Ukraine. Thereafter, Ukrainians might assist the Chinese in organizing the production of the technology in China, sources said.

== LK compared to the Apollo Lunar Module ==
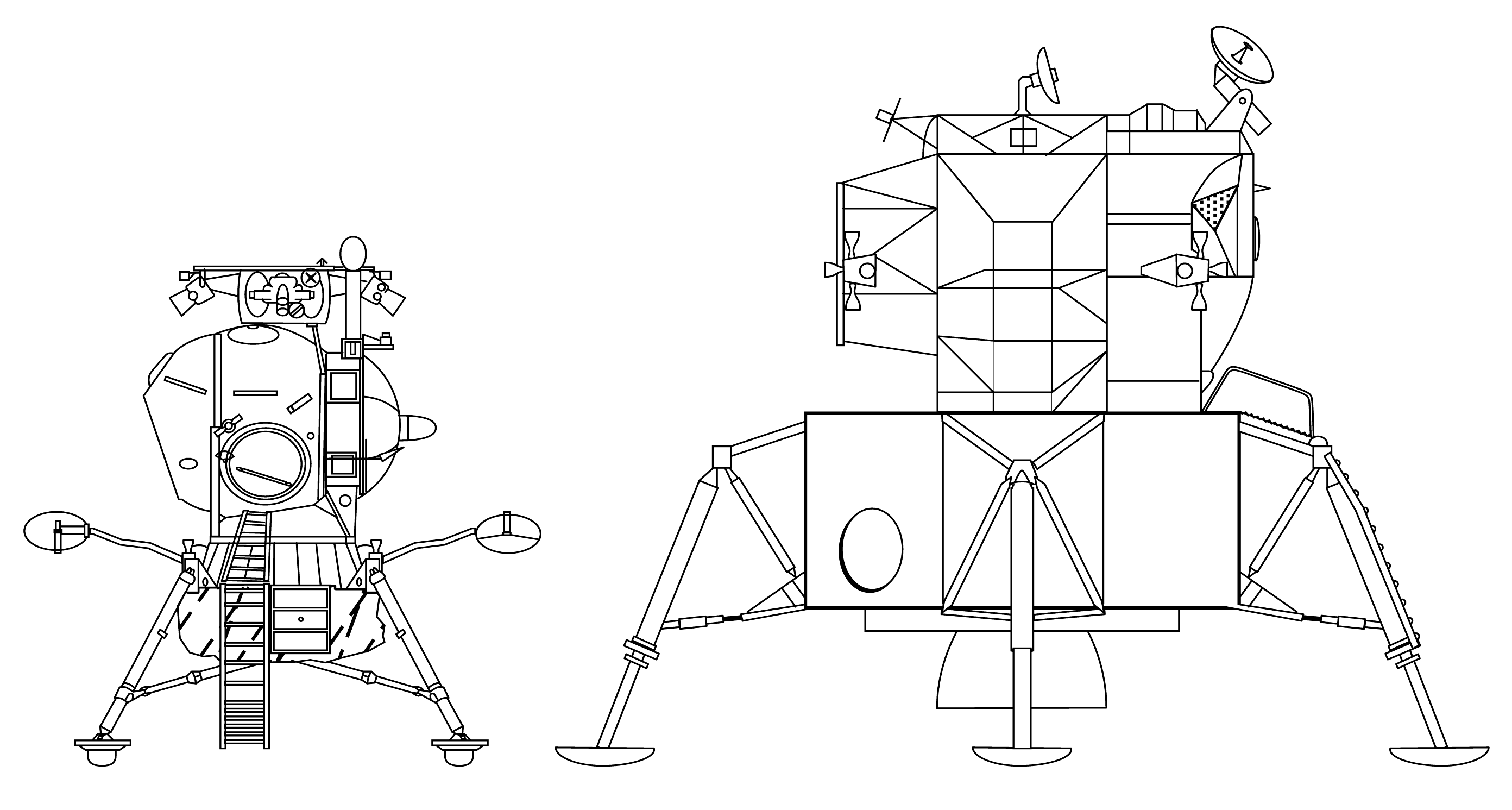
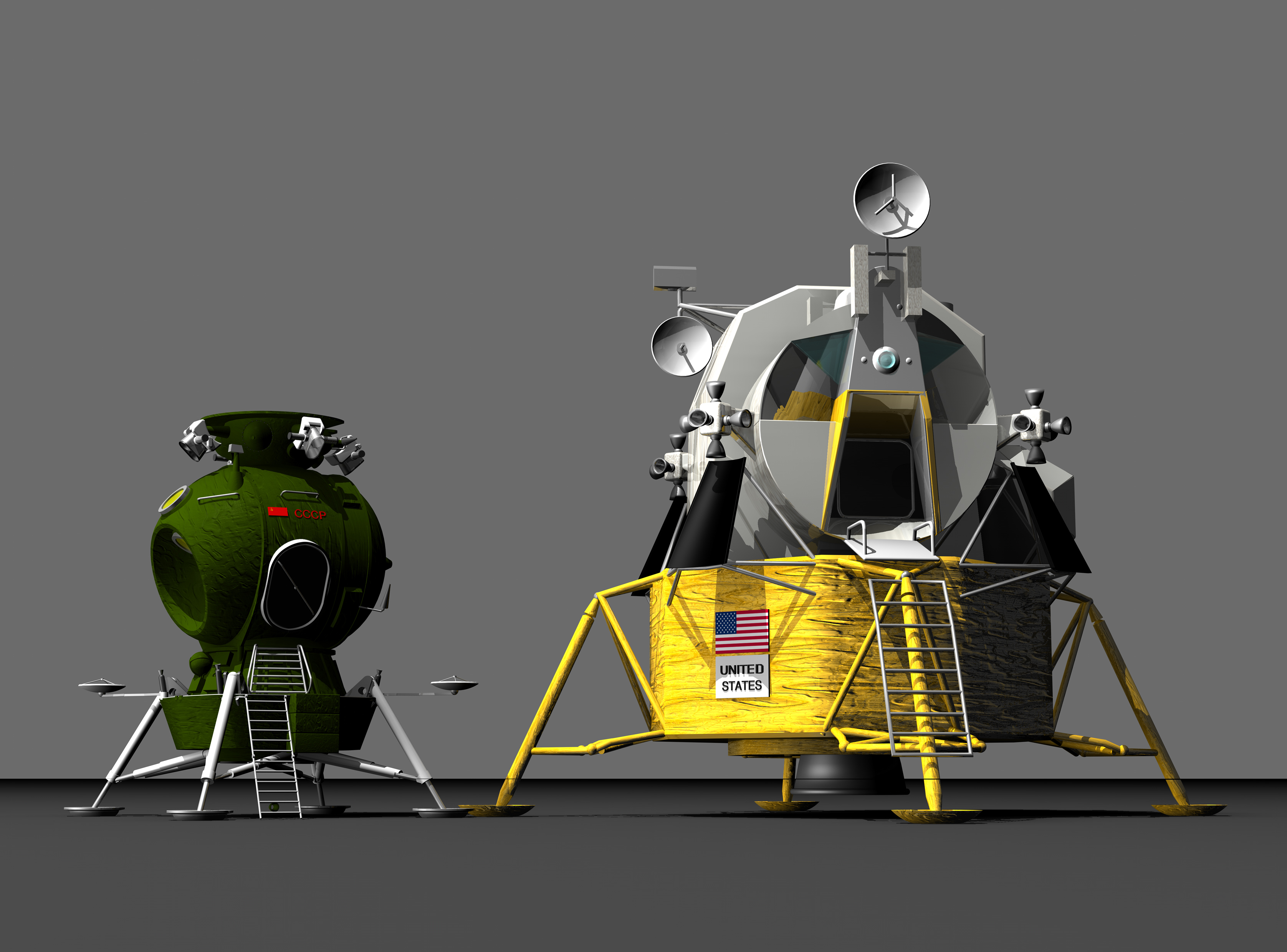
A drawing and a CGI image of the Apollo LM and Soviet LK landers

Because the payload capacity of the N1 rocket was only 95 tons to LEO, versus the Saturn V's 140 tons to LEO, the LK was created to be less bulky than the Apollo Lunar Module (LM):

- It had a different landing profile
- It was lighter at only one-third the mass of the LM
- Initially the LK was to have carried a single cosmonaut. A later variant would have a two-man crew; the LM carried two
- It had no docking tunnel like the LM's; the cosmonaut would space walk from the LOK (Soyuz 7K-L3) to the LK and back.
- To leave lunar orbit and begin descent, the LK used the same braking stage, the Blok D, which put the LK-Soyuz stack into lunar orbit; the LM used its landing stage engine (later Apollo missions also used the SPS engine to help deorbit the LM).
- The final deceleration, from a velocity of 100 m/s at an altitude of 4 km above the lunar surface, was done with a Blok E stage, capable of multiple restarts. This allowed the Blok E to also serve as the ascent stage to return the LK to lunar orbit; the LM's landing stage had a dedicated engine for landing.
- For better performance, LK Blok E engines used turbopumps to provide them with fuel components. Solid charges were used for quick activation of the pumps that limited the number of ignitions.
- After landing the LK landing gear structure was designed to serve as a mini-launch complex for the upper stage's lift-off; the Apollo LM used its descent stage in the same fashion.
- The LK Blok E had both primary and reserve engines allowing for reassurance of ascent; the Apollo LM lifted off with a single ascent engine, and had no backup or reserve but was designed for simplicity and reliability allowing for optimal assurance of ascent. A failure of the LM ascent engine would guarantee a critical mission failure.

== Current location ==
There are five remaining LK in various stages of completion. They are at:

- Moscow Aviation Institute
- Orevo Research and Educational Facility of Bauman University in Dmitrov
- RKK Energia plant at Korolev
- Tambov air base
- A.F. Mozhaysky Military-Space Academy in St Petersburg

The LK from the Moscow Aviation Institute was displayed at Disneyland Paris in the 1990s and at the London Science Museum during their 2016 “Cosmonauts” exhibition.

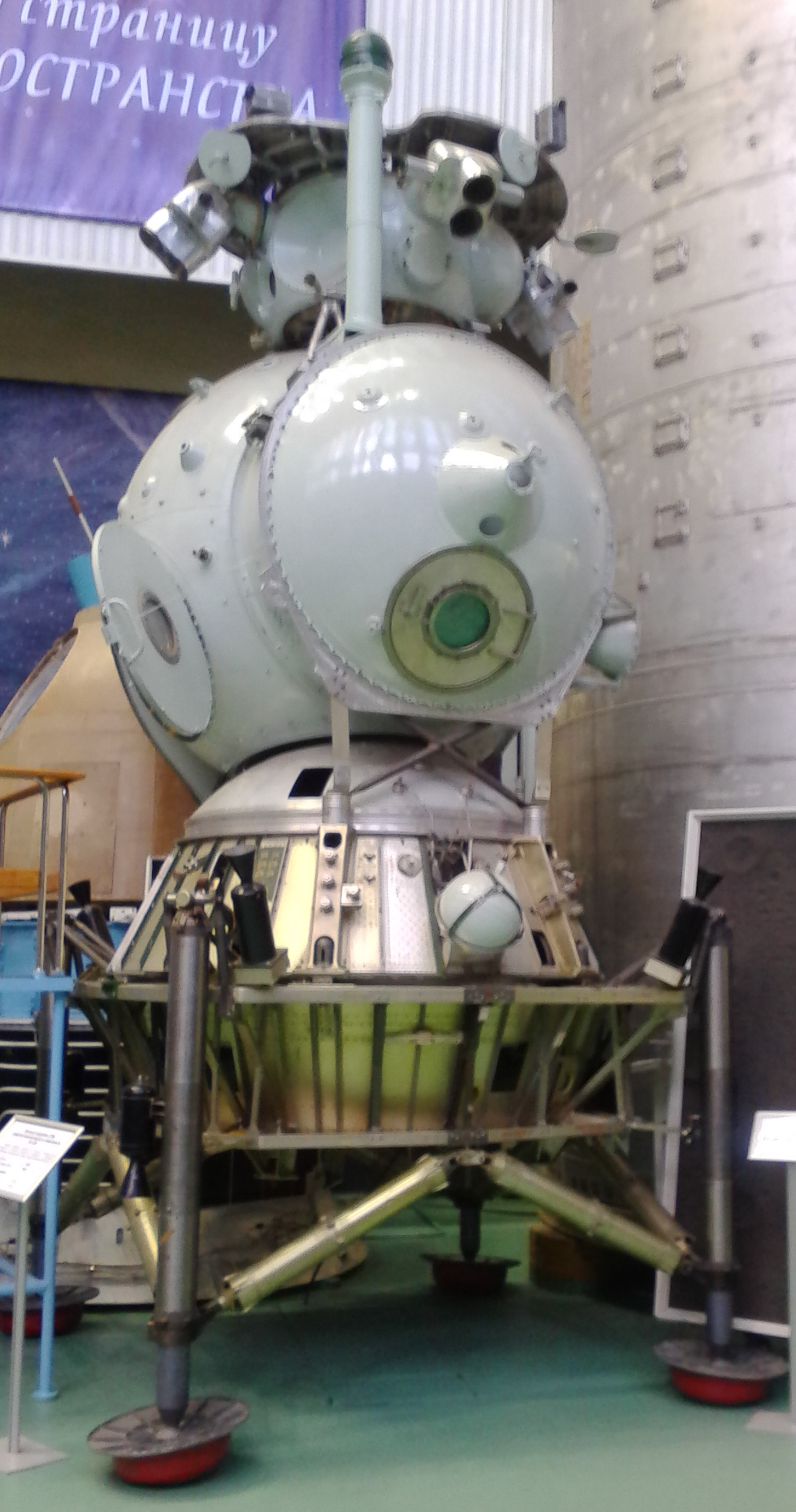
A LK lander at the RKK Energia plant, 2016

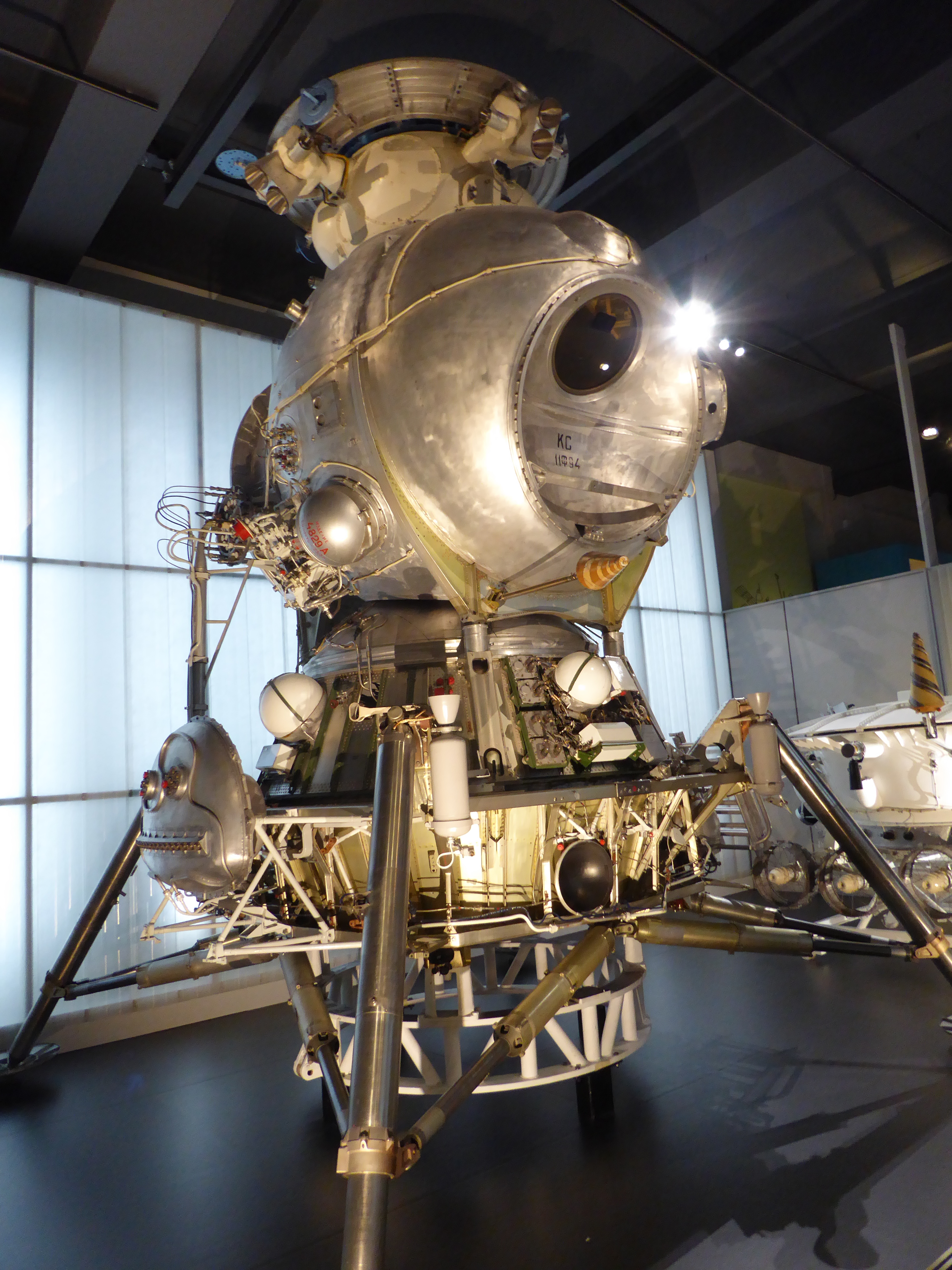
LK-3 engineering test unit, Science Museum, 2016

== See also ==
- Zond program
- Apollo 18 (film)
- Single-person spacecraft
- List of crewed lunar lander designs
- Apollo Lunar Module
- Lanyue lander
