= Kosmos 2 =

Soviet research satellite

- Names: Sputnik 12; 1MS No.1
- Mission type: Technology; Ionosphere
- Harvard designation: 1962 Iota 1
- COSPAR ID: 1962-009A
- SATCAT no.: 269
- Mission duration: 1 year, 4 months and 14 days

Spacecraft properties
- Spacecraft type: 1MS
- Manufacturer: OKB-1
- Launch mass: 285 kg

Start of mission
- Launch date: 6 April 1962, 17:16:00 GMT
- Rocket: Kosmos-2I 63S1
- Launch site: Kapustin Yar, Mayak-2
- Contractor: Yuzhnoye

End of mission
- Decay date: 20 August 1963

Orbital parameters
- Reference system: Geocentric
- Regime: Low Earth
- Perigee altitude: 215 km
- Apogee altitude: 1488 km
- Inclination: 49.0°
- Period: 102.5 minutes
- Epoch: 6 April 1962

Kosmos 2 (Russian: Космос 2 meaning Cosmos 2), also known as 1MS No.1 and occasionally in the West as Sputnik 12 was a technology demonstration and a scientific research satellite launched by the Soviet Union in 1962. It was the second satellite to be designated under the Kosmos system, and the first spacecraft to be launched as part of the MS programme.

== Spacecraft ==
Its primary missions were to develop systems for future satellites, and to record data about cosmic rays and radiation. It had a mass of 285 kg.

== Mission ==
It was launched aboard Kosmos-2I 63S1 s/n 5LK. It was the fourth flight of the Kosmos-2I, and the second to successfully reach orbit. The launch was conducted from Mayak-2 at Kapustin Yar, and occurred at 17:16:00 GMT on 6 April 1962. Kosmos 2 was placed into a low Earth orbit with a perigee of 215 kilometres (134 mi), an apogee of 1,488 kilometres (925 mi), an inclination of 49.0°, and an orbital period of 102.5 minutes. It decayed on 20 August 1963.

Kosmos 2 was a 1MS satellite, the first of two to be launched. The second was launched on 25 October 1962 but failed to reach orbit. The 1MS was the first of two types of MS satellite to be launched and was succeeded by the 2MS satellite.

== See also ==
- 1962 in spaceflight
