= Soyuz Kontakt =

Docking hardware of the Soviet crewed lunar spacecraft program

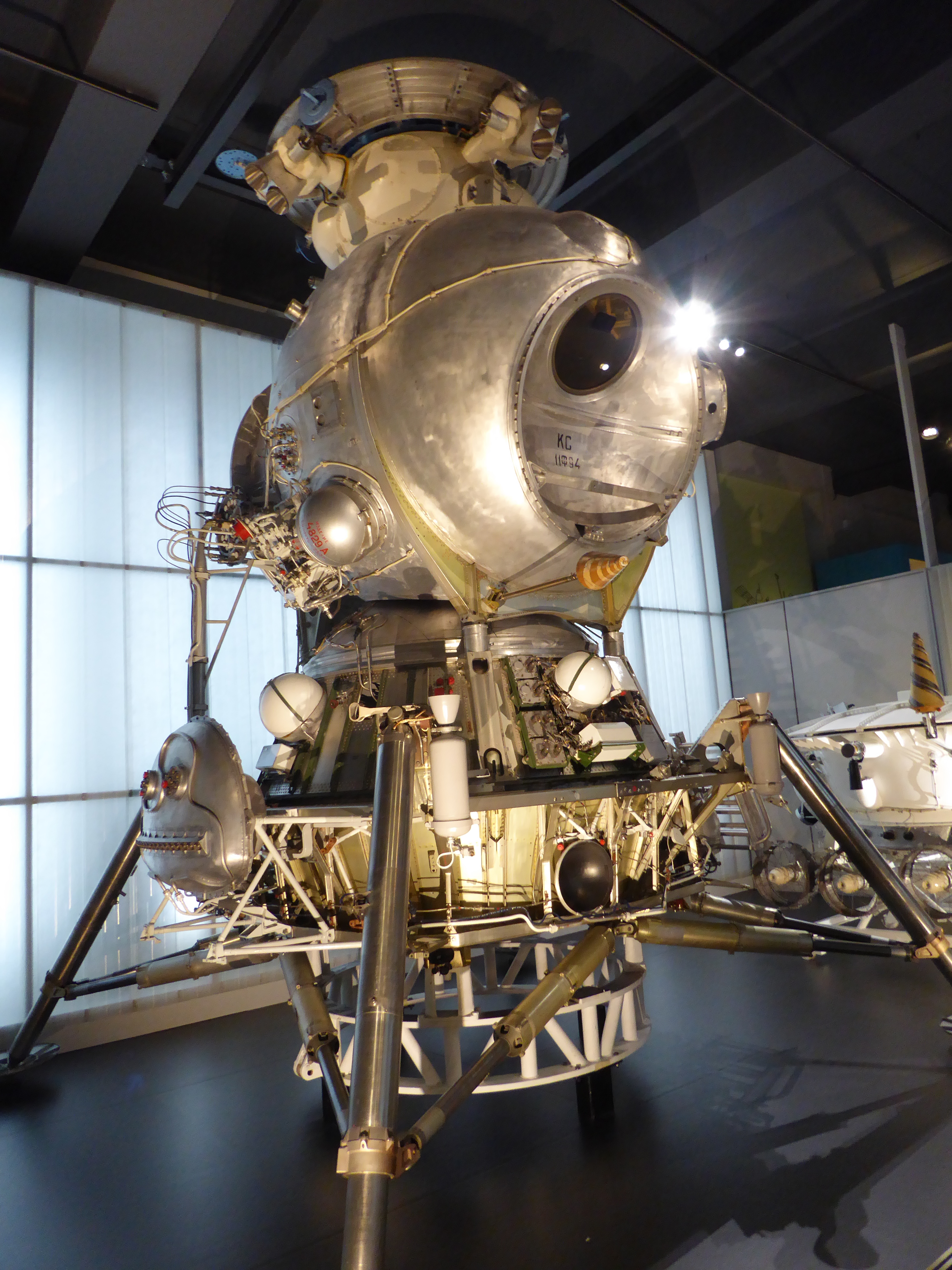
An LK-3 lunar lander, that would have docked with the Soyuz Kontakt. The docking would be with the flat plate at the top

Soyuz Kontakt (Soyuz Contact) was the docking hardware of the Soviet crewed lunar spacecraft program. The Soviet lunar human program was canceled in 1974 after many failures. Four failures of the N-1 Rocket super heavy-lift launch vehicle and the success of the U.S. Apollo program ended the Soviet crewed moon program.

== Background ==
The first docking of two spacecraft was achieved on March 16, 1966, when Gemini 8 rendezvoused and docked with an uncrewed Agena Target Vehicle. Soyuz 4 and Soyuz 5 performed the first docking of two crewed spacecraft on January 16, 1969, coupled with a spacewalk. Then, the Apollo 9 spacecraft/command and service module (CSM) completed a rendezvous and docked with the Lunar Module (LM) on March 3, 1969, using a transfer tunnel.

== Design ==
Plans for the Soyuz 7K-LOK (Lunniy Orbitalny Korabl) spacecraft with a Soyuz Kontakt active docking plate located on the front

Soyuz Kontakt was designed for the Soviet lunar orbit rendezvous of the Soyuz 7K-LOK crewed lunar orbiter spacecraft and Soviet LK lunar lander for the Soviet space program. The Soyuz Kontakt docking system used a three-pronged grappler on the active moving spacecraft. The active spacecraft would then attempt a soft docking between the two spacecraft. The passive non-moving craft would be fitted with a hexagonal grid for the active craft to dock to. To dock, the cosmonaut would have used a manual optical alignment system. Once docked, the crew would then perform an EVA (or extravehicular activity) to transfer to the LK lander (the passive craft).

Before the lunar launch, there were to be several earth-orbit training dockings. For the tests, two Soyuz 11A511 rockets would have put a modified Soyuz 7K-OK crewed spacecraft on earth orbit along with another modified 7K-OK (with the grid adaptation) to be the passive craft. The crew would have docked and then transferred for the test.

The Soyuz 7K-OK crewed spacecraft has space for a crew of three, with a habitable space of 9m^{3}. The vehicle was 7.95 m (26.08 ft) tall with a span of 9.80 m (32.10 ft), and a gross mass of 6,560 kg (14,460 lb). The crew trained for this test mission, but it never launched.

== Cancelled Soyuz Kontakt test missions ==
Four Soyuz Kontakt cosmonaut crews were trained in the docking system. Three tests using six spacecraft were planned. The failure of the N-1 and the death of the Soyuz 11 crew in June 1971 lead to the redesign of the Soyuz spacecraft. All planned Soyuz Kontakt missions were canceled for the near future at that time.

== Soyuz Kontakt 1 ==
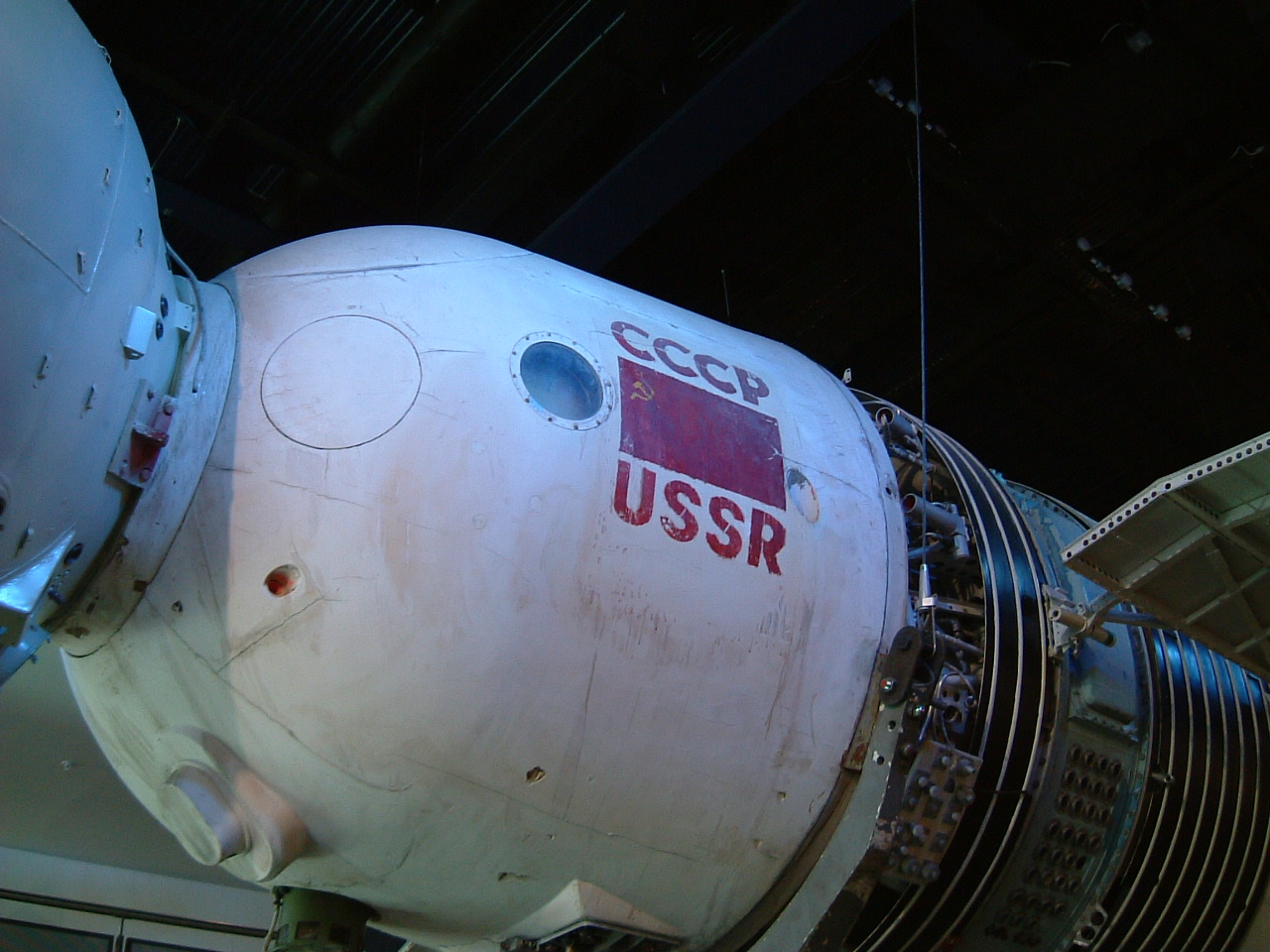
Soyuz 7K-OK, similar to the Soyuz 7K-LOK lunar spacecraft orbiter that was designed to dock with the Soyuz Kontakt

Soyuz Kontakt 1 would have flown with Soyuz s/n 21. Soyuz Kontakt 1 would have installed the passive Kontakt docking system. The same type of docking system that was on the LK lunar lander. For the test Soyuz s/n 20 would have had the active docking target unit. The extravehicular activity crew would have transferred wearing the Krechet spacesuit. Soyuz s/n 21 was planned to launch in early 1972 with a cosmonaut crew of two, Anatoly Filipchenko and Georgy Grechko.

== Soyuz Kontakt 2 ==
Soyuz Kontakt 2 was planned for an early 1972 launch. Soyuz Kontakt 2 prime cosmonaut crew was to be Vasily Lazarev and Oleg Grigoryevich Makarov. An LK lunar lander was planned to be used, not a passive Soyuz. (The first LK was a single cosmonaut transport; a later variant would have had a two-man crew.)

== Soyuz Kontakt 3 ==
Soyuz Kontakt 3 was planned for 1972. Soyuz Kontakt 3's prime cosmonaut crew would have been Lev Vasiliyevich Vorobyov and Vladimir Yazdovsky.

== Soyuz Kontakt 4 ==
Soyuz Kontakt 4 was also planned for 1972. Soyuz Kontakt 4's prime cosmonaut crew would have been Oleg Vasilyevich Dobrovolsky and Vitaly Sevastyanov. Soyuz Kontakt 4 planned to use a LK lunar lander.

== See also ==
- Zond program
- List of crewed lunar lander designs
