= Apollo Docking Mechanism =

Spacecraft docking system used during the Apollo program

Docking Mechanism
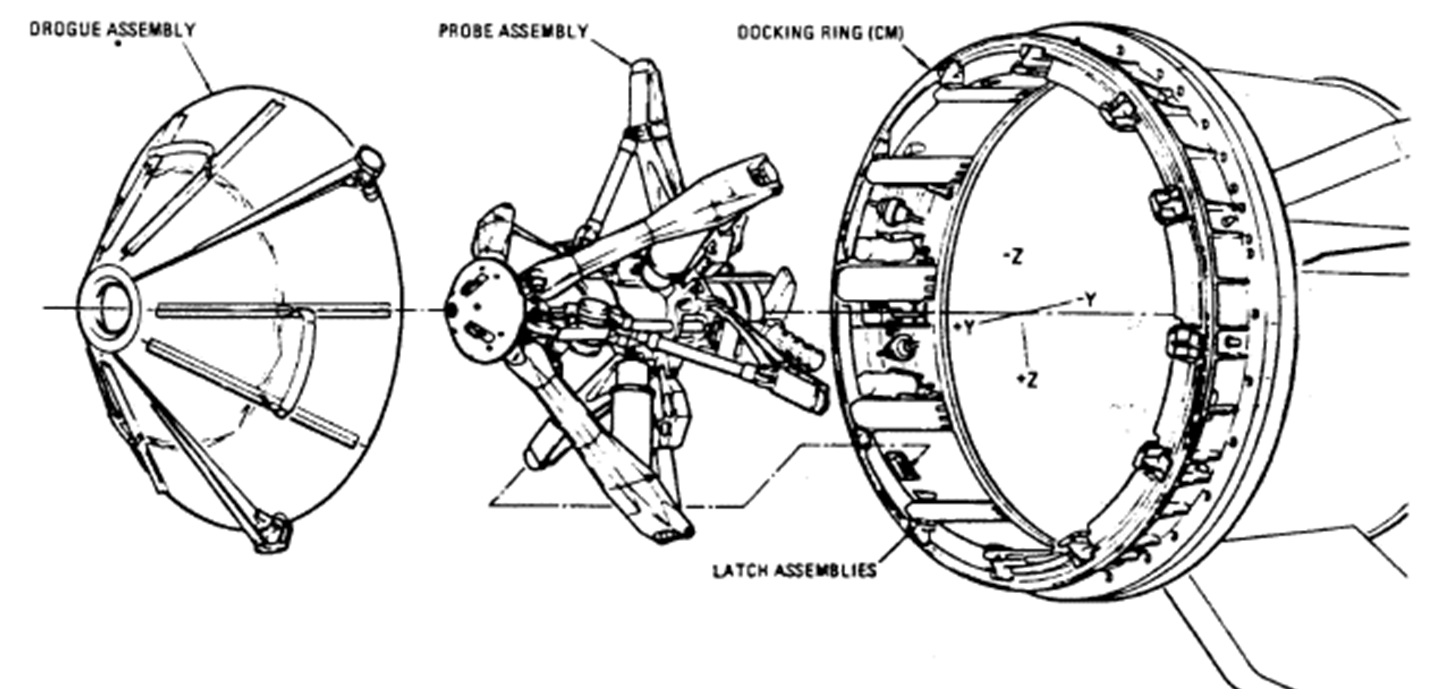
- Apollo drogue and probe assemblies. The docking ring is part of the Apollo Command Module.

Module statistics
- Docked: 19 times
- Diameter: 32 inches (81 cm)

The docking mechanism of the Apollo was a "probe and drogue" system designed to allow the Apollo Command/Service Module (CSM) to dock with the Apollo Lunar Module. The same system was later used for the Skylab 2, Skylab 3 and Skylab 4 CSMs to dock with the Skylab space station, and the Apollo–Soyuz Test Project CSM to dock with a Docking Module adapter which allowed docking with the Soyuz 19 spacecraft. There were 12 hard latches.

The Apollo system differed from the Gemini Docking Mechanism in that after locking, the probe and drogue mechanism could be manually removed to allow access between the two docked craft. Ideas from this system were instrumental in creating later systems, like those used in the Space Shuttle, the International Space Station, and others.

The Apollo docking system was used successfully in thirteen missions in Earth and lunar orbits between 1969 and 1975. The only serious problems were experienced on Apollo 14 and Skylab 2, when the probe systems failed to capture the drogue receptacles during repeated docking attempts. Successful docking was eventually accomplished in both missions.

== See also ==
- Space rendezvous
- Space Race
- Soyuz Kontakt docking
- List of crewed lunar lander designs
