= Docking and berthing of spacecraft =

Joining of two or more space vehicles

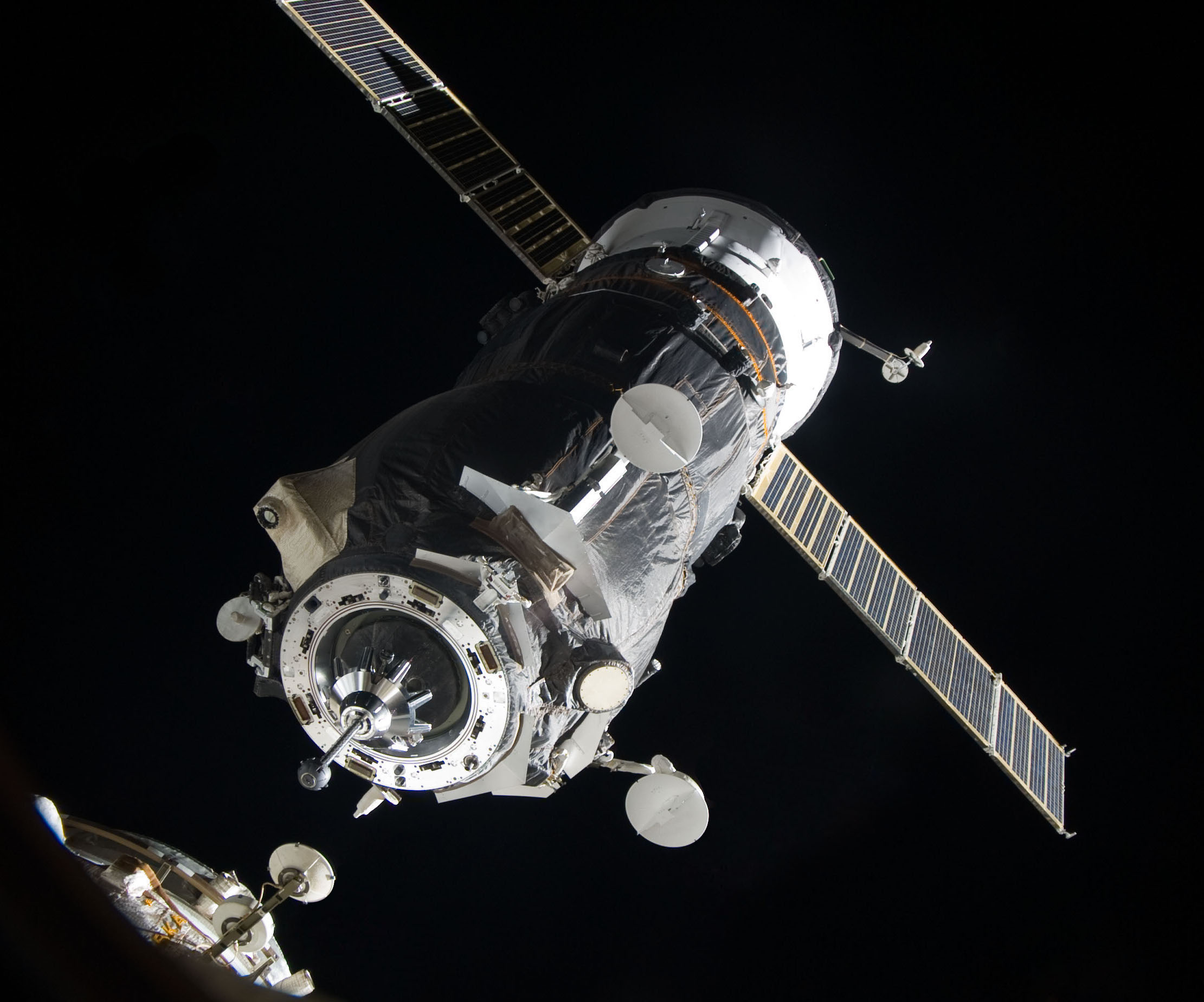
Free-flying Progress spacecraft in process of docking to the International Space Station

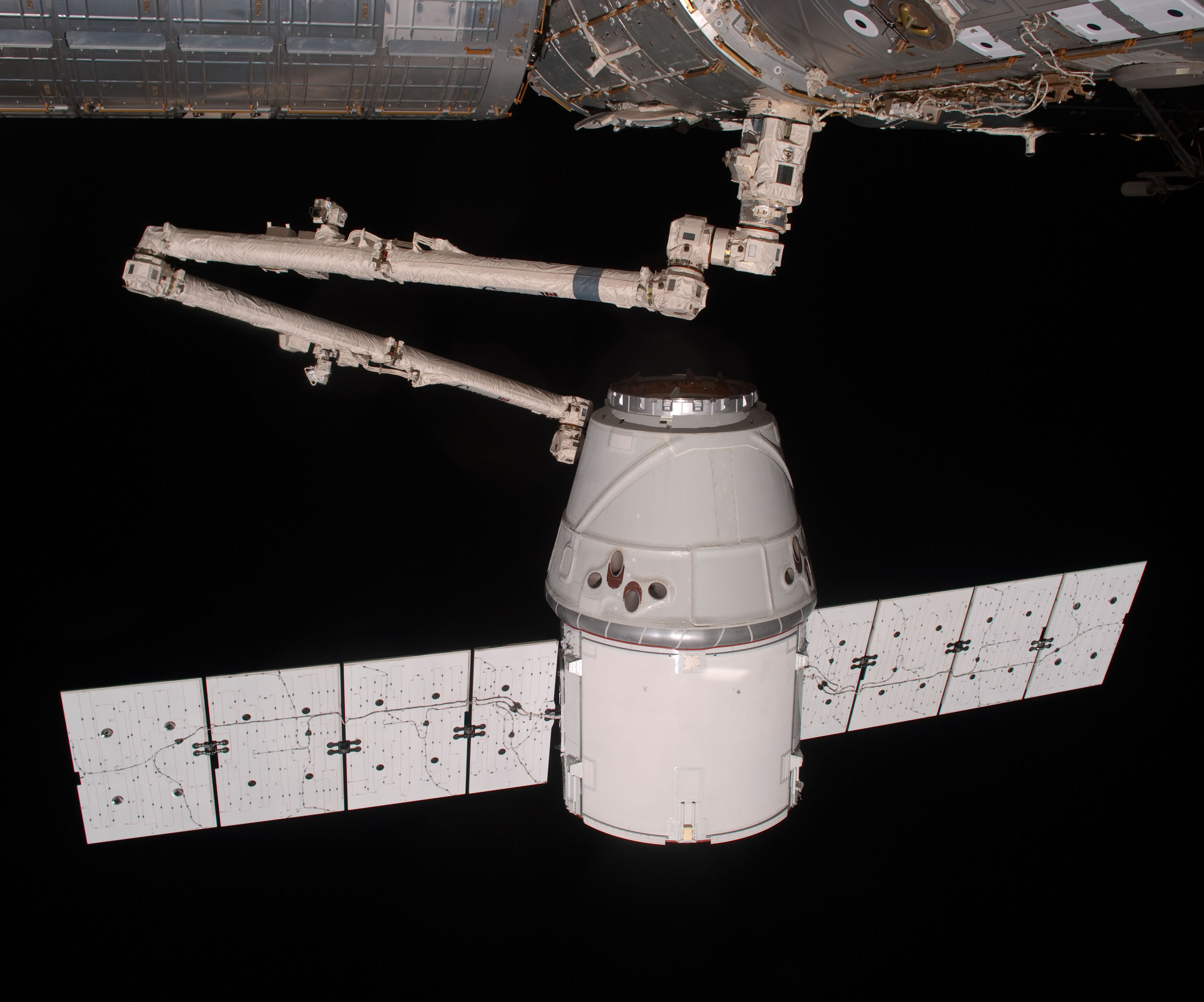
SpaceX Dragon spacecraft attached to the Canadarm2 in preparation for berthing to the ISS

Docking and berthing of spacecraft is the joining of two space vehicles. This connection can be temporary, or partially permanent such as for space station modules.

Docking specifically refers to joining of two separate free-flying space vehicles. Berthing refers to mating operations where a passive module/vehicle is placed into the mating interface of another space vehicle by using a robotic arm. Because the modern process of un-berthing requires more crew labor and is time-consuming, berthing operations are unsuited for rapid crew evacuations in the event of an emergency.

== History ==
=== Docking ===
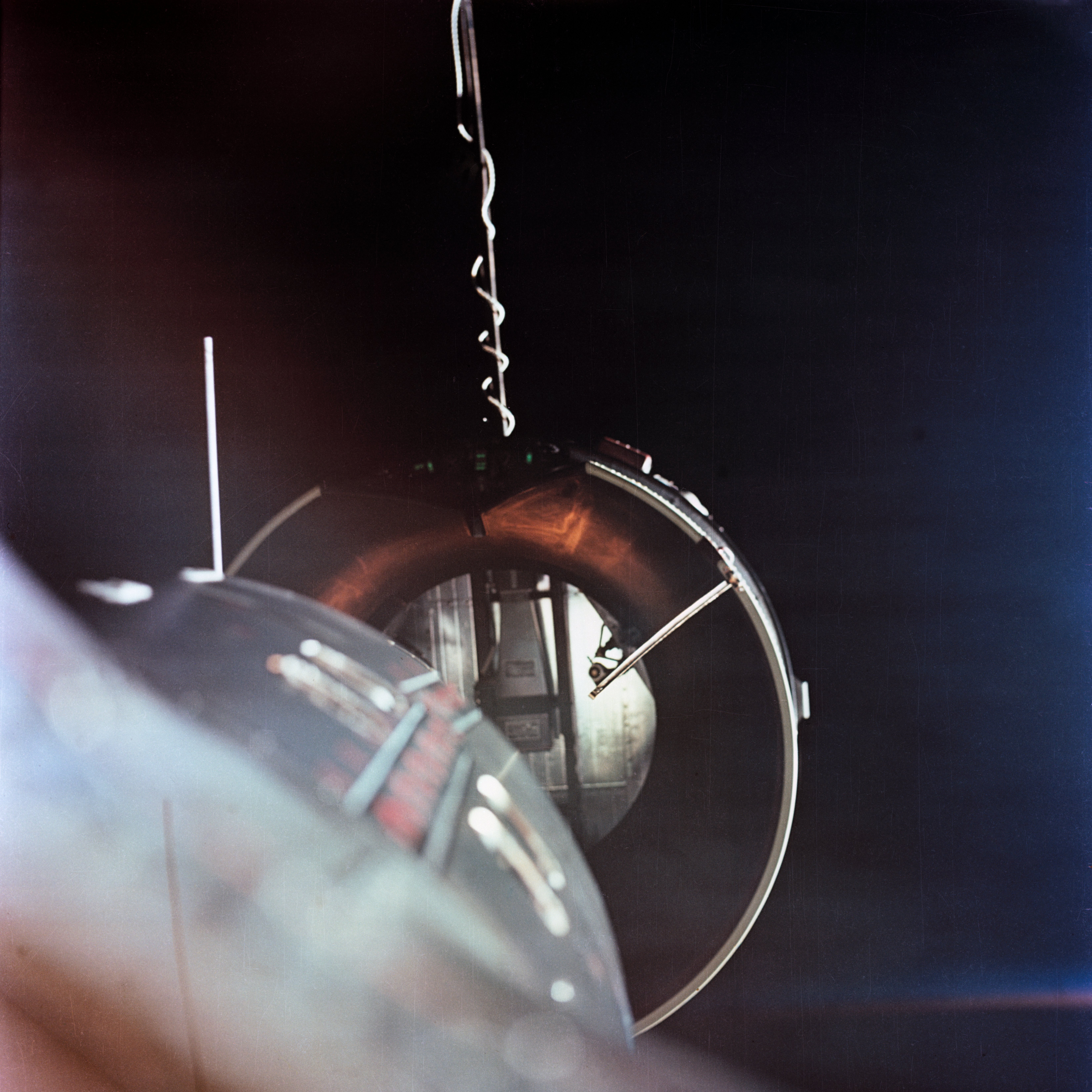
The first spacecraft docking was performed between Gemini 8 and an uncrewed Agena Target Vehicle on March 16, 1966.

Spacecraft docking capability depends on space rendezvous, the ability of two spacecraft to find each other and station-keep in the same orbit. This was first developed by the United States for Project Gemini. It was planned for the crew of Gemini 6 to rendezvous and manually dock under the command of Wally Schirra, with an uncrewed Agena Target Vehicle in October 1965, but the Agena vehicle exploded during launch. On the revised mission Gemini 6A, Schirra successfully performed a rendezvous in December 1965 with the crewed Gemini 7, approaching to within 0.3 metres (1 ft), but there was no docking capability between two Gemini spacecraft. The first docking with an Agena was successfully performed under the command of Neil Armstrong on Gemini 8 on March 16, 1966. Manual dockings were performed on three subsequent Gemini missions in 1966.

The Apollo program depended on lunar orbit rendezvous to achieve its objective of landing men on the Moon. This required first a transposition, docking, and extraction maneuver between the Apollo command and service module (CSM) mother spacecraft and the Lunar Module (LM) landing spacecraft, shortly after both craft were sent out of Earth orbit on a path to the Moon. Then after completing the lunar landing mission, two astronauts in the LM had to rendezvous and dock with the CSM in lunar orbit, in order to be able to return to Earth. The spacecraft were designed to permit intra-vehicular crew transfer through a tunnel between the nose of the Command Module and the roof of the Lunar Module. These maneuvers were first demonstrated in low Earth orbit on March 7, 1969, on Apollo 9, then in lunar orbit in May 1969 on Apollo 10, then in six lunar landing missions, as well as on Apollo 13 where the LM was used as a rescue vehicle instead of making a lunar landing.

Unlike the United States, which used manual piloted docking throughout the Apollo, Skylab, and Space Shuttle programs, the Soviet Union employed automated docking systems from the beginning of its docking attempts. The first such system, Igla, was successfully tested on October 30, 1967, when the two uncrewed Soyuz test vehicles Kosmos 186 and Kosmos 188 docked automatically in orbit. This was the first successful Soviet docking. Proceeding to crewed docking attempts, the Soviet Union first achieved rendezvous of Soyuz 3 with the uncrewed Soyuz 2 craft on October 25, 1968; docking was unsuccessfully attempted. The first crewed docking was achieved on January 16, 1969, between Soyuz 4 and Soyuz 5. This early version of the Soyuz spacecraft had no internal transfer tunnel, but two cosmonauts performed an extravehicular transfer from Soyuz 5 to Soyuz 4, landing in a different spacecraft than they had launched in.

In the 1970s, the Soviet Union upgraded the Soyuz spacecraft to add an internal transfer tunnel and used it to transport cosmonauts during the Salyut space station program with the first successful space station visit beginning on 7 June 1971, when Soyuz 11 docked to Salyut 1. The United States followed suit, docking its Apollo spacecraft to the Skylab space station in May 1973. In July 1975, the two nations cooperated in the Apollo-Soyuz Test Project, docking an Apollo spacecraft with a Soyuz using a specially designed docking module to accommodate the different docking systems and spacecraft atmospheres.

Beginning with Salyut 6 in 1978, the Soviet Union began using the uncrewed Progress cargo spacecraft to resupply its space stations in low earth orbit, greatly extending the length of crew stays. As an uncrewed spacecraft, Progress rendezvoused and docked with the space stations entirely automatically. In 1986, the Igla docking system was replaced with the updated Kurs system on Soyuz spacecraft. Progress spacecraft received the same upgrade several years later. The Kurs system is still used to dock to the Russian Orbital Segment of the International Space Station.

=== Berthing ===
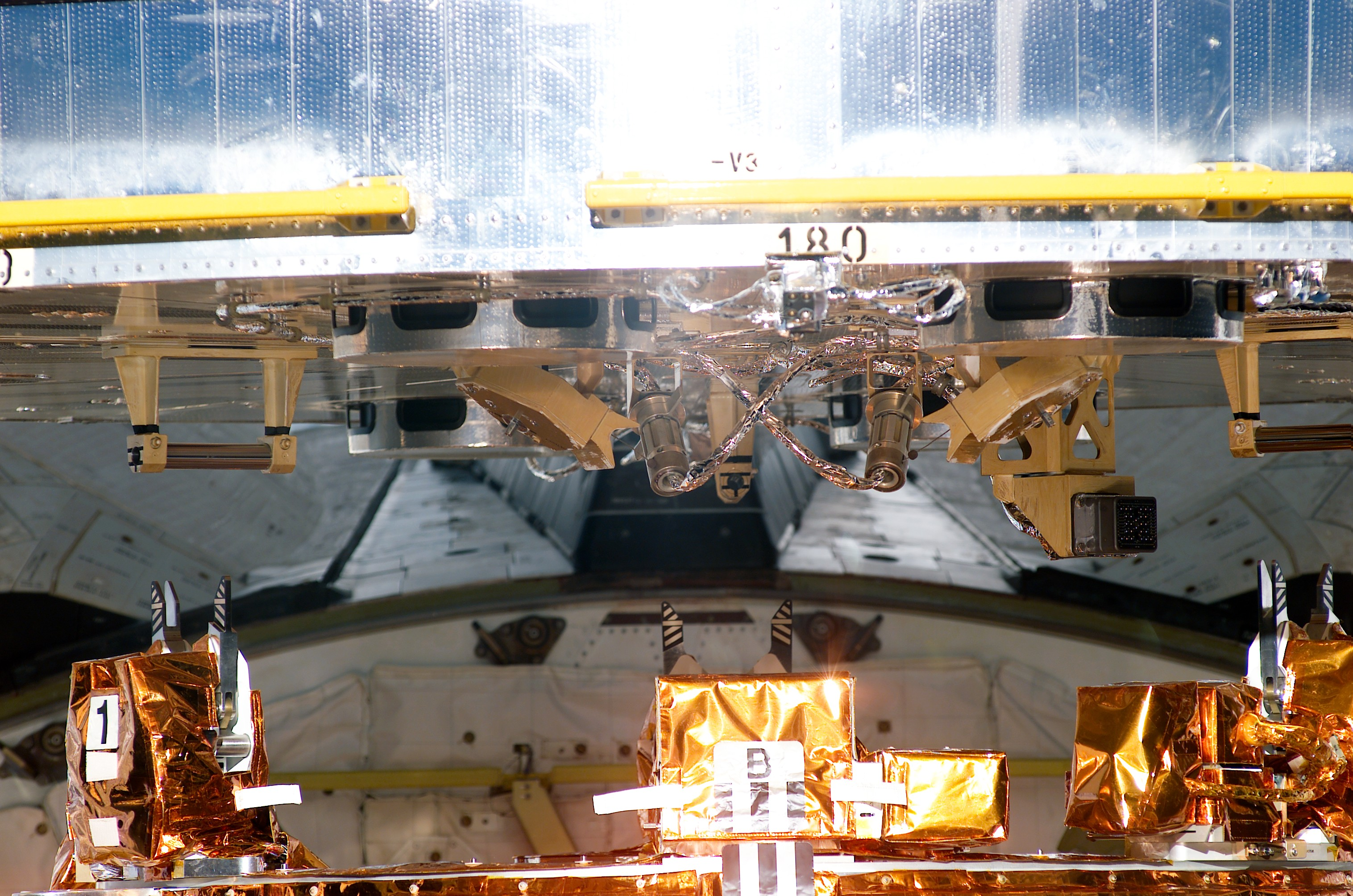
Flight Support Structure in Columbia's payload bay under the 180 degree mark on the -V3 plane of the Hubble Space Telescope during STS-109.

Berthing of spacecraft can be traced at least as far back as the berthing of payloads into the Space Shuttle payload bay. Such payloads could be either free-flying spacecraft captured for maintenance/return, or payloads temporarily exposed to the space environment at the end of the Remote Manipulator System. Several different berthing mechanisms were used during the Space Shuttle era. Some of them were features of the Payload Bay (e.g., the Payload Retention Latch Assembly), while others were airborne support equipment (e.g., the Flight Support Structure used for HST servicing missions).

== Hardware ==
=== Androgyny ===
Docking/berthing systems may be either androgynous (ungendered) or non-androgynous (gendered), indicating which parts of the system may mate together.

Early systems for conjoining spacecraft were all non-androgynous docking system designs. Non-androgynous designs are a form of gender mating where each spacecraft to be joined has a unique design (male or female) and a specific role to play in the docking process. The roles cannot be reversed. Furthermore, two spacecraft of the same gender cannot be joined at all.

Androgynous docking (and later androgynous berthing) by contrast has an identical interface on both spacecraft. In an androgynous interface, there is a single design which can connect to a duplicate of itself. This allows system-level redundancy (role reversing) as well as rescue and collaboration between any two spacecraft. It also provides more flexible mission design and reduces unique mission analysis and training.

=== List of mechanisms/systems ===
Image	Name	Method	Internal crew transfer	Notes	Type
	Gemini Docking Mechanism	Docking	No	Allowed the Gemini Spacecraft (active) to dock to the Agena target vehicle (passive).	Non-Androgynous
	Apollo Docking Mechanism	Docking	Yes	Allowed the Command/Service Module (active) to dock to the Apollo Lunar Module (passive) and the Skylab space station (passive). Was used to dock to the Docking Module adapter (passive) during the Apollo–Soyuz Test Project (ASTP), which enabled the crew to dock with a Soviet Soyuz 7K-TM spacecraft. It had a circular pass through diameter of 810 mm (32 in).	Non-Androgynous
	Original Russian probe and drogue docking system	Docking	No	The original Soyuz probe-and-drogue docking system was used with the first generation Soyuz 7K-OK spacecraft from 1966 until 1970 in order to gather engineering data as a preparation for the Soviet space station program. The gathered data were subsequently used for the conversion of the Soyuz spacecraft – which was initially developed for the Soviet crewed lunar program – into a space station transport craft. A first docking with two uncrewed Soyuz spacecraft – the first fully automated space docking in the history of space flight – was made with the Kosmos 186 and Kosmos 188 missions on October 30, 1967.	Non-Androgynous
	Kontakt docking system	Docking	No	Intended to be used in the Soviet crewed lunar program to allow the Soyuz 7K-LOK ("Lunar Orbital Craft", active) to dock to the LK lunar lander (passive).	Non-Androgynous
	SSVP-G4000	Docking	Yes	SSVP-G4000 is also known more vaguely as the Russian probe and drogue or simply the Russian Docking System (RDS). In Russian, SSVP stands for Sistema Stykovki i Vnutrennego Perekhoda, literally "System for docking and internal transfer". It was used for the first docking to a space station in the history of space flight, with the Soyuz 10 and Soyuz 11 missions that docked to the Soviet space station Salyut 1 in 1971. The docking system was upgraded in the mid-1980s to allow the docking of 20 ton modules to the Mir space station. It has a circular transfer passage that has a diameter of 800 mm (31 in) and is manufactured by RKK Energiya. The probe-and-drogue system allows visiting spacecraft using the probe docking interface, such as Soyuz, Progress and ESA's ATV spacecraft, to dock to space stations that offer a port with a drogue interface, like the former Salyut and Mir or the current ISS space station. There are a total of four such docking ports available on the Russian Orbital Segment of ISS for visiting spacecraft; These are located on the Zvezda, Rassvet, Prichal and Poisk modules. Furthermore, the probe-and-drogue system was used on the ISS to dock Rassvet semipermanently to Zarya.	Non-Androgynous
	APAS-75	Docking	Yes	Used on the Apollo-Soyuz Test Project Docking Module and Soyuz 7K-TM. There were variations in design between the American and Soviet version but they were still mechanically compatible.	Androgynous
	APAS-89	Docking	Yes	Used on Mir (Kristall, Mir Docking Module), Soyuz TM-16, Buran (was planned). It had a circular transfer passage with a diameter of 800 mm (31 in).	Androgynous
	APAS-95	Docking	Yes	It was used for Space Shuttle dockings to Mir and ISS, On the ISS, it was also used on Zarya module, Russian Orbital Segment to interface with PMA-1 on Unity module, US Orbital Segment It has a diameter of 800 mm (31 in). Described as "essentially the same as" APAS-89.	Androgynous (Shuttle and PMA-1), Non-Androgynous (Zarya, PMA-2 and PMA-3)
	SSVP-M8000 (Hybrid Docking System)	Docking	Yes	SSVP-M8000 or more commonly known as "hybrid", is a combination of a "probe and drogue" soft-dock mechanism with an APAS-95 hard-dock collar. It began to be manufactured in 1996. It is manufactured by RKK Energiya. Used on ISS (connects Zvezda to Zarya, Pirs, Poisk, Nauka and Nauka to Prichal)	Non-Androgynous
	Common Berthing Mechanism	Berthing	Yes	Used on ISS (USOS), MPLMs, HTV, SpaceX Dragon 1, Cygnus. The standard CBM has a pass through in the shape of a square with rounded edges and has a width of 1,300 mm (50 in). The smaller hatch that Cygnus uses results in a transfer passage of the same shape but has a width of 940 mm (37 in).	Non-Androgynous
	Chinese Docking Mechanism	Docking	Yes	Used by Shenzhou spacecraft, beginning with Shenzhou 8, to dock to Chinese space stations. The Chinese docking mechanism is based on the Russian APAS-89/APAS-95 system; some have called it a "clone". There have been contradicting reports by the Chinese on its compatibility with APAS-89/95. It has a circular transfer passage that has a diameter of 800 mm (31 in). The androgynous variant has a mass of 310 kg and the non-androgynous variant has a mass of 200 kg. Used for the first time on Tiangong 1 space station and will be used on future Chinese space stations and with future Chinese cargo resupply vehicles.	Androgynous (Shenzhou); Non-Androgynous (Tiangong-1)
	Chinese Docking Mechanism	Grappling-type	No	Used for China's uncrewed sample return missions when ascender transfers samples to orbiter for Earth return such as Chang'e 5/6.	Non-Androgynous
	International Docking System Standard (IDSS)	Docking or Berthing	Yes	Used on the ISS International Docking Adapter, SpaceX Dragon 2, Boeing Starliner and future vehicles. Circular transfer passage diameter is 800 mm (31 in). The International Berthing and Docking Mechanism (IBDM) is an implementation of IDSS to be used on European Space Agency spacecraft. IBDM will also be used on Dream Chaser.	Active, Passive, or Androgynous (i.e., both). Active (Commercial Crew Vehicle, Orion); Passive (IDA)
	ASA-G/ASP-G	Berthing	Yes	Used by Nauka Science (or Experiment) Airlock, to berth to nauka forward port. The berthing mechanism is a unique hybrid derivative the Russian APAS-89/APAS-95 system as it has 4 petals instead of 3 along with 12 structural hooks and is a combination of an active "probe and drogue" soft-dock mechanism on port and passive target on airlock.	Non-Androgynous
	SSPA-GB 1/2 (Hybrid Docking System)	Docking	Yes	It is a modified passive hybrid version of SSVP-M8000. Used on ISS (Prichal lateral ports for future add-on modules)	Non-Androgynous
	Bhartiya Docking System (BDS)	Docking or Berthing	Yes	Modified IDSS. In contrast to the 24 motors used in IDSS, the BDS only uses two. The docking port at SpaDex is 450 mm (18 in) in diameter, whereas the docking port at the Gaganyaan and Bharatiya Antariksh Station will be 800 mm (31 in) as on IDSS.	Androgynous (i.e., both). Used on SpaDeX, Gaganyaan and Bharatiya Antariksh Station.

=== Adapters ===
A docking or berthing adapter is a mechanical or electromechanical device that facilitates the connection of one type of docking or berthing interface to a different interface. Such interfaces may be docking/docking, docking/berthing, or berthing/berthing. Previously launched and planned to be launched adapters are listed below:

- ASTP Docking Module: An airlock module that converted U.S. Probe and Drogue to APAS-75. Built by Rockwell International for the 1975 Apollo–Soyuz Test Project mission.
- Pressurized Mating Adapter (PMA): Converts an active Common Berthing Mechanism to APAS-95. Three PMAs are attached to the ISS, PMA-1 and PMA-2 were launched in 1998 on STS-88, PMA-3 in late 2000 on STS-92. PMA-1 is used to connect the Zarya control module with Unity node 1, Space Shuttles used PMA-2 and PMA-3 for docking.
- International Docking Adapter (IDA): Converts APAS-95 to the International Docking System Standard. IDA-1 was planned to be launched on SpaceX CRS-7 until its launch failure, and attached to Node-2's forward PMA. IDA-2 was launched on SpaceX CRS-9 and attached to Node-2's forward PMA. IDA-3, the replacement for IDA-1 launched on SpaceX CRS-18 and attached to Node-2's zenith PMA. The adapter is compatible with the International Docking System Standard (IDSS), which is an attempt by the ISS Multilateral Coordination Board to create a docking standard.
- SSPA-GM: Converts passive SSVP-M8000 (Hybrid Docking System) to passive SSVP-G4000. The docking ring initially used for Soyuz MS-18 and Progress MS-17 docking on Nauka until detached by Progress MS-17 for Prichal module arrived on ISS. It was made for the Nauka nadir and Prichal nadir ports of the International Space Station, where Soyuz and Progress spacecraft had to dock to a port designated for modules. Before removal of SSPA-GM, the docking ring is 80 cm (31 in) in diameter; that becomes 120 cm (47 in) after removal.
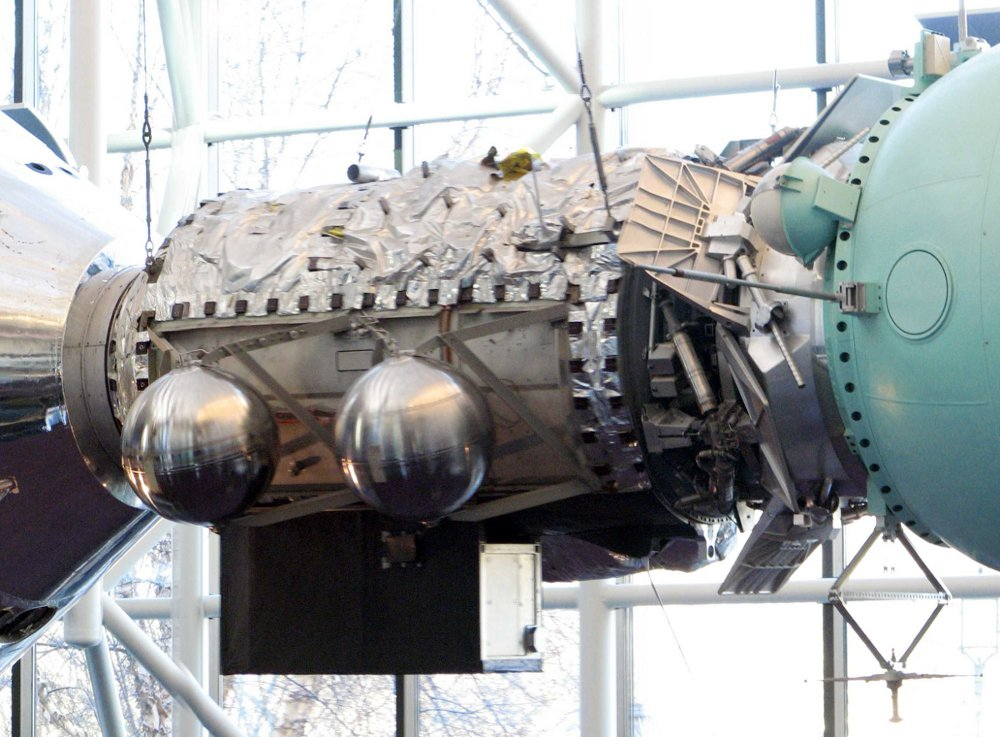
ASTP Docking Module

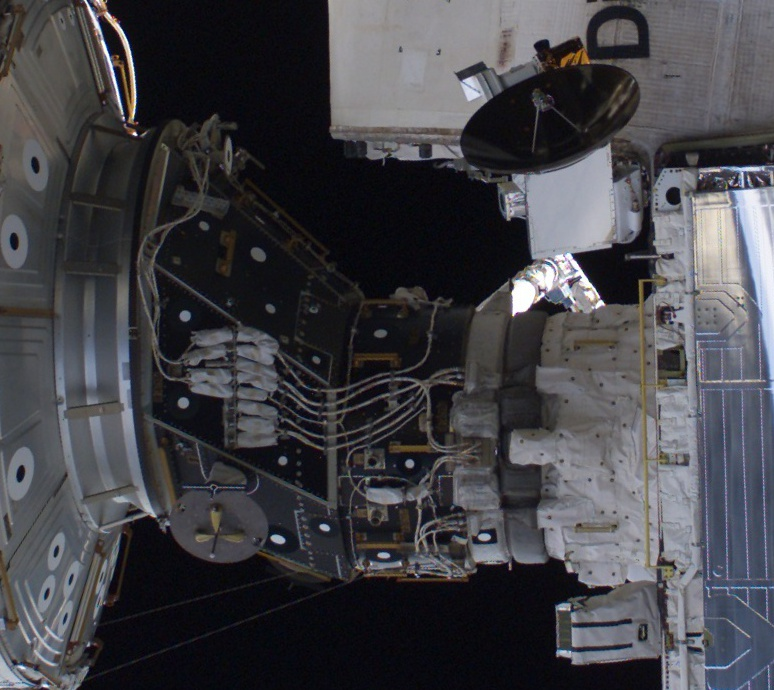
Pressurized Mating Adapter

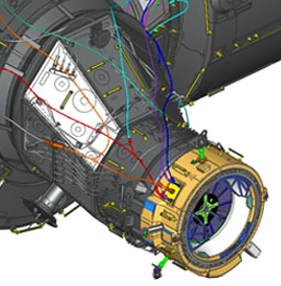
International Docking Adapter

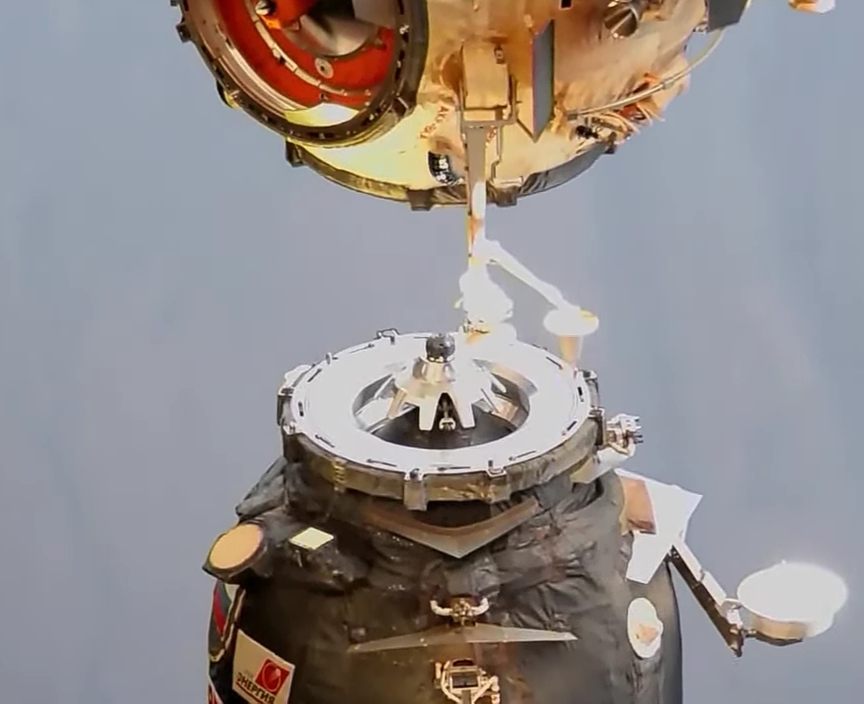
APAS to SSVP (SSVPA-GM) Docking Ring

== Docking of uncrewed spacecraft ==
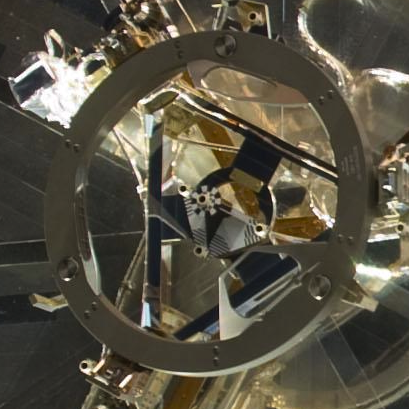
The Soft-Capture Mechanism (SCM) added in 2009 to the Hubble Space Telescope. The SCM allows both crewed and uncrewed spacecraft that utilize the NASA Docking System (NDS) to dock with Hubble.

For the first fifty years of spaceflight, the main objective of most docking and berthing missions was to transfer crew, construct or resupply a space station, or to test for such a mission (e.g. the docking between Kosmos 186 and Kosmos 188). Therefore, commonly at least one of the participating spacecraft was crewed, with a pressurized habitable volume (e.g. a space station or a lunar lander) being the target—the exceptions were a few fully uncrewed Soviet docking missions (e.g. the dockings of Kosmos 1443 and Progress 23 to an uncrewed Salyut 7 or Progress M1-5 to an uncrewed Mir). Another exception were a few missions of the crewed US Space Shuttles, like berthings of the Hubble Space Telescope (HST) during the five HST servicing missions. The Japanese ETS-VII mission (nicknamed Hikoboshi and Orihime) in 1997 was designed to test uncrewed rendezvous and docking, but launched as one spacecraft which separated to join back together.

Changes to the crewed aspect began in 2015, as a number of economically driven commercial dockings of uncrewed spacecraft were planned. In 2011, two commercial spacecraft providers announced plans to provide autonomous/teleoperated uncrewed resupply spacecraft for servicing other uncrewed spacecraft. Notably, both of these servicing spacecraft were intending to dock with satellites that weren't designed for docking, nor for in-space servicing.

The early business model for these services was primarily in near-geosynchronous orbit, although large delta-v orbital maneuvering services were also envisioned.

Building off of the 2007 Orbital Express mission—a U.S. government-sponsored mission to test in-space satellite servicing with two vehicles designed from the ground up for on-orbit refueling and subsystem replacement—two companies announced plans for commercial satellite servicing missions that would require docking of two uncrewed vehicles.

- Space Infrastructure Servicing (SIS) is a spacecraft that was being developed by Canadian aerospace firm MacDonald, Dettwiler and Associates (MDA)—maker of Canadarm—to operate as a small-scale in-space refueling depot for communication satellites in geosynchronous orbit. Intelsat was a requirements and funding partner for the initial demonstration satellite, intended for launch in 2015.
- Mission Extension Vehicle (MEV) was a spacecraft being developed in 2011 by the U.S. firm ViviSat, a 50/50 joint venture of aerospace firms U.S. Space and ATK, to operate as a small-scale in-space satellite-refueling spacecraft. MEV would dock but would not transfer fuel. Rather it would use "its own thrusters to supply attitude control for the target."

The SIS and MEV vehicles each planned to use a different docking technique. SIS planned to utilize a ring attachment around the kick motor while the Mission Extension Vehicle would use a somewhat more standard insert-a-probe-into-the-nozzle-of-the-kick-motor approach.

A prominent spacecraft that received a mechanism for uncrewed dockings is the Hubble Space Telescope (HST). In 2009 the STS-125 shuttle mission added the Soft-Capture Mechanism (SCM) at the aft bulkhead of the space telescope. The SCM is meant for unpressurized dockings and will be used at the end of Hubble's service lifetime to dock an uncrewed spacecraft to de-orbit Hubble. The SCM used was designed to be compatible to the NASA Docking System (NDS) interface to reserve the possibility of a servicing mission. The SCM will, compared to the system used during the five HST Servicing Missions to capture and berth the HST to the Space Shuttle, significantly reduce the rendezvous and capture design complexities associated with such missions. The NDS bears some resemblance to the APAS-95 mechanism, but is not compatible with it.

== Non-cooperative docking ==
Docking with a spacecraft (or other human made space object) that does not have an operable attitude control system might sometimes be desirable, either in order to salvage it, or to initiate a controlled de-orbit. Some theoretical techniques for docking with non-cooperative spacecraft have been proposed so far. Yet, with the sole exception of the Soyuz T-13 mission to salvage the crippled Salyut 7 space station, as of 2006, all spacecraft dockings in the first fifty years of spaceflight had been accomplished with vehicles where both spacecraft involved were under either piloted, autonomous or telerobotic attitude control. In 2007, however, a demonstration mission was flown that included an initial test of a non-cooperative spacecraft captured by a controlled spacecraft with the use of a robotic arm. Research and modeling work continues to support additional autonomous noncooperative capture missions in the coming years.

=== Salyut 7 space station salvage mission ===
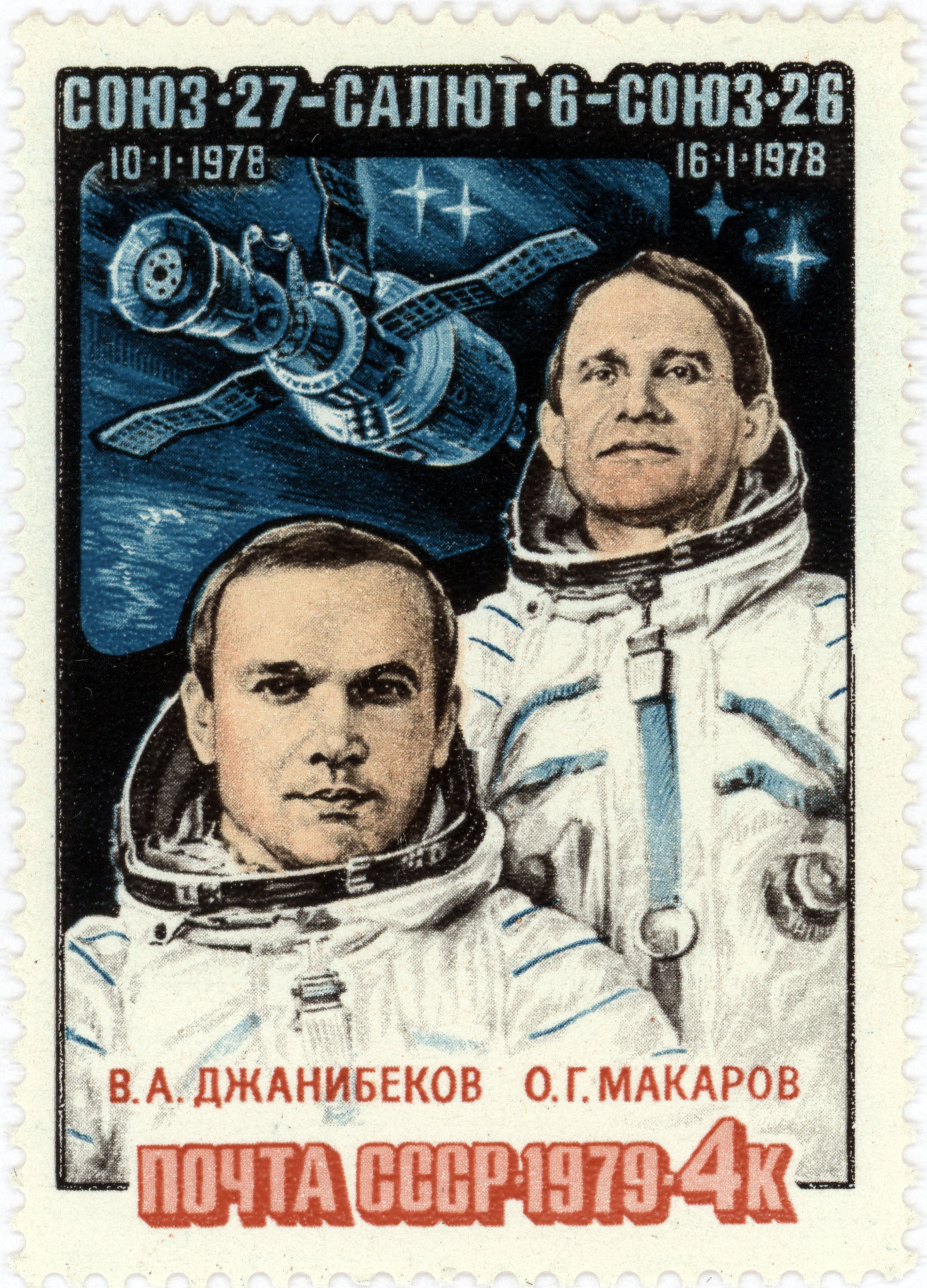
Commander Vladimir Dzhanibekov (left) with Oleg Grigoryevich Makarov (right) on a 1978 Soviet postage stamp

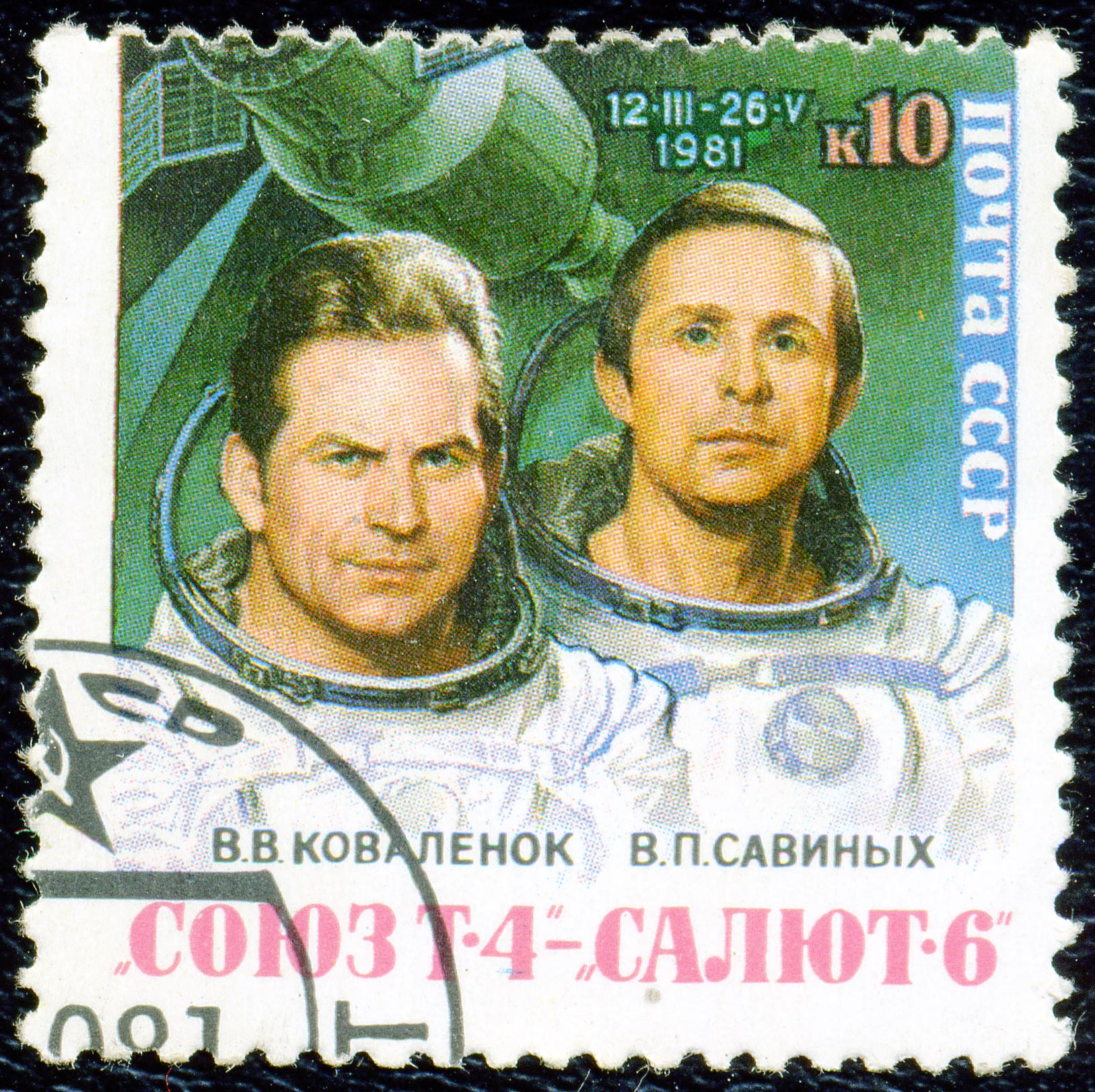
Doctor of technical sciences Viktor Savinykh with Vladimir Kovalyonok pictured on a Soviet postage stamp commemorating a Salyut 6 mission

Salyut 7, the tenth space station of any kind launched, and Soyuz T-13 were docked in what author David S. F. Portree describes as "one of the most impressive feats of in-space repairs in history". Solar tracking failed and due to a telemetry fault the station did not report the failure to mission control while flying autonomously. Once the station ran out of electrical energy reserves it ceased communication abruptly in February 1985. Crew scheduling was interrupted to allow Soviet military commander Vladimir Dzhanibekov and technical science flight engineer Viktor Savinykh to make emergency repairs.

All Soviet and Russian space stations were equipped with automatic rendezvous and docking systems, from the first space station Salyut 1 using the IGLA system, to the Russian Orbital Segment of the International Space Station using the Kurs system. The Soyuz crew found the station was not broadcasting radar or telemetry for rendezvous, and after arrival and external inspection of the tumbling station, the crew judged proximity using handheld laser rangefinders.

Dzhanibekov piloted his ship to intercept the forward port of Salyut 7, matched the station's rotation and achieved soft dock with the station. After achieving hard dock they confirmed that the station's electrical system was dead. Prior to opening the hatch, Dzhanibekov and Savinykh sampled the condition of the station's atmosphere and found it satisfactory. Attired in winter fur-lined clothing, they entered the cold station to conduct repairs. Within a week sufficient systems were brought back online to allow robot cargo ships to dock with the station. Nearly two months went by before atmospheric conditions on the space station were normalized.

=== Uncrewed dockings of non-cooperative space objects ===
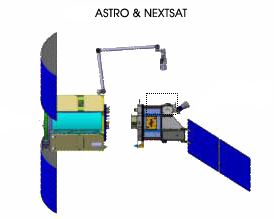
Orbital Express: ASTRO (left) and NEXTSat (right), 2007

Non-cooperative rendezvous and capture techniques have been theorized, and one mission has successfully been performed with uncrewed spacecraft in orbit.

A typical approach for solving this problem involves two phases. First, attitude and orbital changes are made to the "chaser" spacecraft until it has zero relative motion with the "target" spacecraft. Second, docking maneuvers commence that are similar to traditional cooperative spacecraft docking. A standardized docking interface on each spacecraft is assumed.

NASA has identified automated and autonomous rendezvous and docking — the ability of two spacecraft to rendezvous and dock "operating independently from human controllers and without other back-up, [and which requires technology] advances in sensors, software, and realtime on-orbit positioning and flight control, among other challenges" — as a critical technology to the "ultimate success of capabilities such as in-orbit propellant storage and refueling," and also for complex operations in assembling mission components for interplanetary destinations.

The Automated/Autonomous Rendezvous & Docking Vehicle (ARDV) is a proposed NASA Flagship Technology Demonstration (FTD) mission, for flight as early as 2014/2015. An important NASA objective on the proposed mission is to advance the technology and demonstrate automated rendezvous and docking. One mission element defined in the 2010 analysis was the development of a laser proximity operations sensor that could be used for non-cooperative vehicles at distances between 1 metre (3 ft 3 in) and 3 kilometers (2 mi). Non-cooperative docking mechanisms were identified as critical mission elements to the success of such autonomous missions.

Grappling and connecting to non-cooperative space objects was identified as a top technical challenge in the 2010 NASA Robotics, tele-robotics and autonomous systems roadmap.

== Docking states ==
A docking/berthing connection is referred to as either "soft" or "hard". Typically, a spacecraft first initiates a soft dock by making contact and latching its docking connector with that of the target vehicle. Once the soft connection is secured, if both spacecraft are pressurized, they may proceed to a hard dock where the docking mechanisms form an airtight seal, enabling interior hatches to be safely opened so that crew and cargo can be transferred.

== Berthing spacecraft and modules ==
Docking and undocking describe spacecraft using a docking port, without assistance and under their own power. Berthing takes place when a spacecraft or unpowered module cannot use a docking port or requires assistance to use one. This assistance may come from a spacecraft, such as when the Space Shuttle used its robotic arm to push ISS modules into their permanent berths. In a similar fashion the Poisk module was permanently berthed to a docking port after it was pushed into place by a modified Progress spacecraft which was then discarded. The Cygnus resupply spacecraft arriving at the ISS does not connect to a docking port, instead it is pulled into a berthing mechanism by the station's robotic arm and the station then closes the connection. The berthing mechanism is used only on the US segment of the ISS, the Russian segment of the ISS uses docking ports for permanent berths.

== Mars surface docking ==
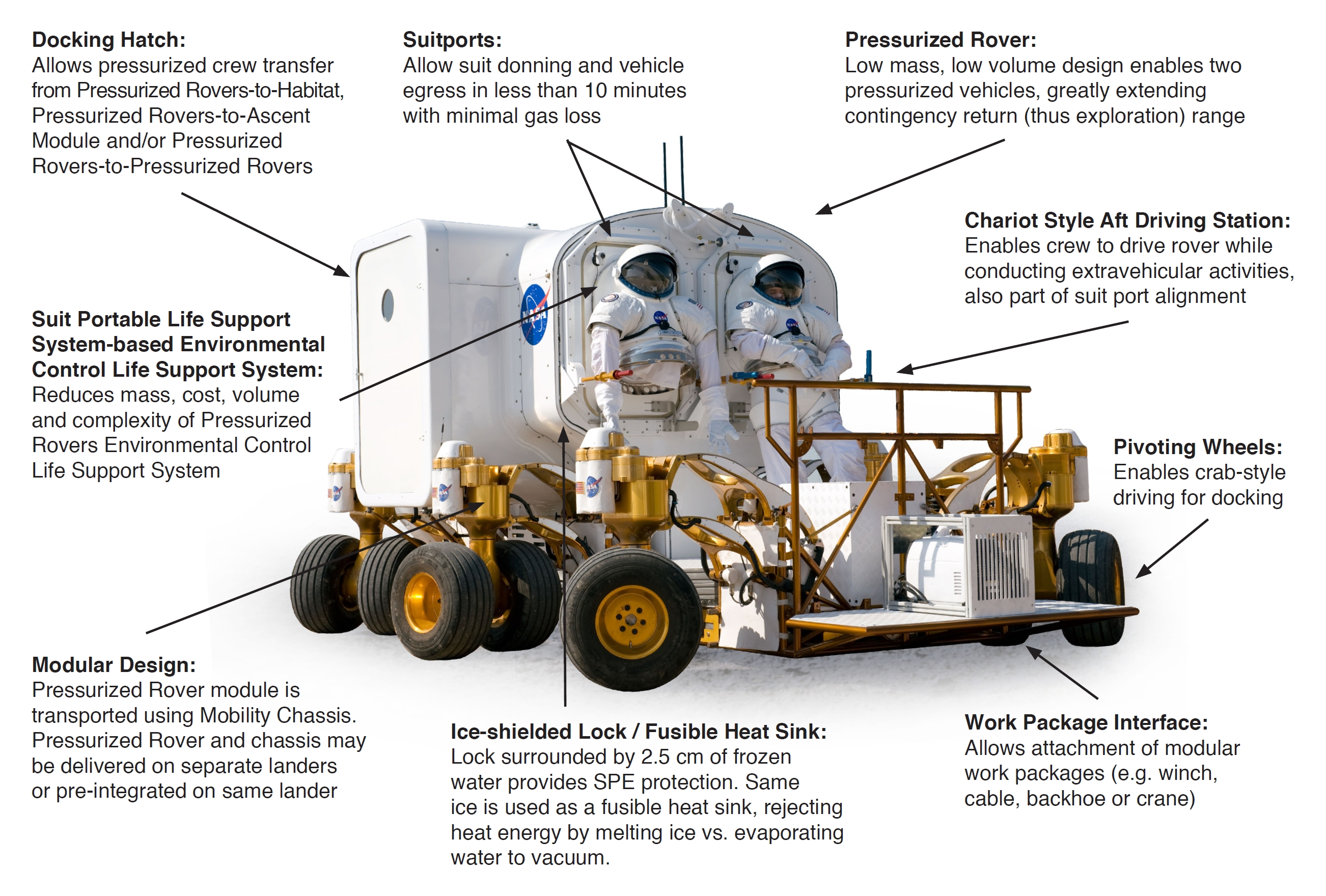
SEV components

Docking has been discussed by NASA in regards to a Crewed Mars rover, such as with Mars habitat or ascent stage. The Martian surface vehicle (and surface habitats) would have a large rectangular docking hatch, approximately 2 by 1 meter (6.6 by 3.3 ft).

== Gallery ==
Timelapse of undocking of a Soyuz spacecraft from the International Space Station
